= Herbert Hans Haupt =

Spy for Nazi Germany (1919–1942)

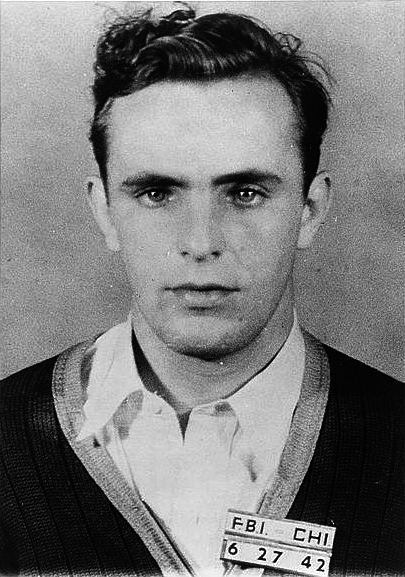
- Haupt's FBI mugshot on June 27, 1942
- Born: December 21, 1919; Stettin, Free State of Prussia, Weimar Republic
- Died: August 8, 1942 (aged 22); D.C. Jail, Washington, D.C., United States
- Citizenship: Germany; United States
- Known for: Spying for Nazi Germany
- Political party: German American Bund
- Children: 1
- Status: Executed by electrocution
- Convictions: Acting as an unlawful combatant with the intent to commit sabotage, espionage, and other hostile acts Aiding the enemy as an unlawful combatant Espionage; Conspiracy
- Penalty: Death
- Espionage activity
- Allegiance: Nazi Germany
- Service years: 1941–1942
- Operations: Operation Pastorius

Herbert Hans Haupt (December 21, 1919 – August 8, 1942) was an American spy and saboteur for Nazi Germany during World War II. He was one of six Nazi saboteurs executed by the United States in 1942 for espionage and sabotage as part of Operation Pastorius; at least two of the implicated men, including Haupt, were American citizens.

== Early life ==
Born in Stettin, Haupt was the son of Hans Max and Erna (Froehling) Haupt. Hans Haupt was a World War I Imperial German Army veteran who came to Chicago in 1923 to find work. His wife and son followed in 1925. Herbert Haupt became a United States citizen in 1930, at the age of 10, when his parents were naturalized. He attended Lane Tech High School in Chicago and later worked at the Simpson Optical Company as an apprentice optician. As a youth, Haupt was a member of the German American Bund's Junior League.

In the years prior to the war, Haupt expressed pro-Nazi sentiments, saying that Germany was better than the United States. At one point, an acquaintance, Lawrence J. Jordan, punched Haupt in the face after he went to a party dressed in a storm trooper's uniform and speaking in favor of Nazism.

== World War II ==
In 1941, Haupt, with two friends, Wolfgang Wergin and Hugo Troesken, set off on a world trek. Troesken was turned back at the Mexican border for lack of proper identification, but Haupt and Wergin continued. Neither Haupt nor Wergin had been able to secure American passports before the trip. As they were German born (and thus still considered by Germany to be its citizens), they secured German passports from the embassy in Mexico City.

They sailed to Japan, where they found work on a German merchant ship bound for France. Haupt and Wergin arrived in France at the time of the Japanese attack on Pearl Harbor after which Adolf Hitler had declared war against the United States. Now stranded in Europe, Haupt went to stay at his grandmother's home in Stettin. Wergin enlisted in the Wehrmacht.

As a civilian coast watcher, Haupt was awarded an Iron Cross 2nd Class, as well as the Blockade Runner Badge, for having helped his passenger ship run the British blockade when he served as a lookout on the way to France. This drew the attention of the Abwehr (Secret Service), which recruited him to return to America as a saboteur. Haupt later insisted that he accepted the job only as a way to return home.

=== Operation Pastorius ===
Operation Pastorius consisted of 12 English-speaking Germans who were trained as secret agents at the Brandenburg Sabotage School. Eight eventually graduated and were sent to the U.S. via U-boat to try to damage U.S. war industries. Haupt and three others landed on Ponte Vedra Beach, Florida on June 17, 1942. The remaining group landed on Long Island.

Haupt promptly took a train from Jacksonville, Florida to Chicago, where he stayed with his parents and visited his girlfriend. He may well have intended to remain inactive until the end of the war. However, two members of the Long Island group, George John Dasch and Ernest Peter Burger, had almost immediately turned themselves in to American authorities, naming the other members of their teams. Haupt and his parents were arrested in Chicago on June 27.

== Trial and death ==
Herbert Haupt and the other seven "U-boat raiders" were sent to Washington, D.C., where they faced a military tribunal. All were found guilty of being spies, and even though they had not carried out any sabotage, six–including Haupt–were sentenced to death. Dasch and Burger received long prison sentences, which were commuted to deportation after the war.

Haupt, Edward Kerling, Hermann Neubauer, Werner Thiel, Heinrich Heinck, and Richard Quirin were all executed on August 8, 1942, in the District of Columbia's electric chair. It was the largest mass execution by electrocution ever conducted at the D.C. Jail. Haupt's last undelivered letter to his father read, "Try not to take this too hard. I have brought nothing but grief to all of my friends and relatives who did nothing wrong, my last thoughts will be of Mother."

Haupt was buried with the five others in the Potter's Field in Blue Plains, D.C. The graves were originally marked by wooden boards with numbers, but eventually a small monument was placed by the American Nazi Party over the graves in 1982. The marker went largely unnoticed until it was removed by the National Park Service in 2010. Haupt's parents, Hans and Erna, were both convicted of treason and stripped of their citizenship for harboring and allegedly aiding their son. Four others were convicted in the same trial as Haupt's parents: Haupt's uncle, Walter Wilhelm Froehling, his aunt, Lucille Froehling, and the parents of Wolfgang Wergin, Otto Richard Wergin and Kate Martha Wergin. U.S. District Judge William Joseph Campbell sentenced Hans Haupt, Walter, and Otto to death, and Erna, Lucille, and Kate to 25 years in prison each.

Campbell won praise around the country for the severity of the sentences. On appeal, however, all six defendants had their convictions reversed on several technicalities, mainly errors by the FBI when they took their confession and the refusal of the court to grant separate trials to the defendants. Walter and Otto later pleaded guilty to misprision of treason and each received five-year sentences. Hans Haupt was retried, found guilty of treason once more, but received a life sentence. Charges were dropped against Lucille and Kate, albeit Erna Haupt was held until the war ended and deported in 1948. In 1957, Hans Haupt was granted clemency by President Dwight D. Eisenhower and deported to Germany on the condition that he never return to the United States.

== Modern relevance ==
In 2001, President George Bush attempted to use military tribunals to try American citizens after the September 11, 2001 attacks. The Supreme Court ruling regarding Haupt, the only U.S. citizen executed in the affair, was cited (Ex parte Quirin).

== See also ==
- Capital punishment by the United States federal government
- List of people executed by the United States federal government
- List of people executed in the United States in 1942

== Sources ==
- They Came to Kill by Eugene Rachlis, 1961 Random House
- Shadow Enemies by Scott Gordon, 2002 Lyons Press
- Saboteurs, Nazi Raid on America, 2004 Alfred Knopf
- In Time of War, by Pierce O'Donnell, 2005 The New Press
