= Carl Krepper =

German-American pastor and Nazi collaborator

Carl Emil Ludwig Krepper
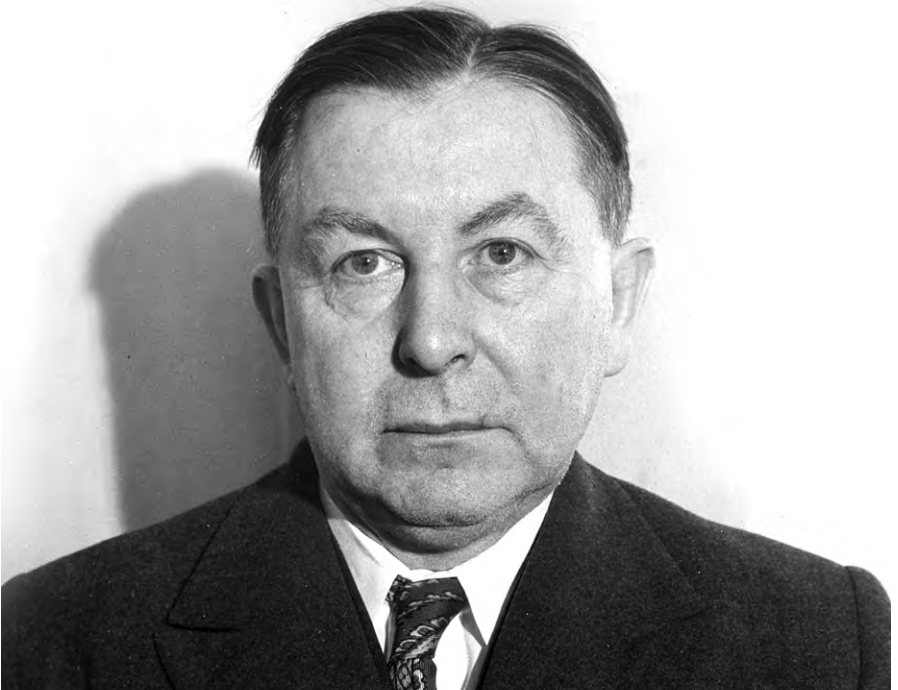
- Born: May 11, 1884; Altona, Hamburg, German Empire
- Died: June 2, 1972 (aged 88); Great Barrington, Massachusetts, U.S.
- Known for: German–American pastor who aided the saboteurs of Operation Pastorius
- Political party: German American Bund
- Status: Deceased
- Convictions: Trading with the enemy (50 U.S.C. § 4301); Conspiracy to commit sabotage and violate censorship laws (50 U.S.C. § 618)
- Penalty: 12 years imprisonment

Carl Emil Ludwig Krepper (May 11, 1884 – June 21, 1972) was a German-American Lutheran pastor and Nazi collaborator who assisted the Nazi saboteurs in Operation Pastorius during World War II.

== Early life ==
Krepper was born in Altona, Hamburg. He attended the Ebenezer Seminary, which trained Lutheran clergy, at Kropp in Schleswig-Holstein. In 1909, Krepper moved to the United States, where he was naturalized. He served at Lutheran churches in Newark, Rahway, Carteret, and Bridgeton, all in New Jersey. He later earned a master's degree from Rutgers University. In his master's thesis, Krepper was very critical of the U.S. and the church for not being outspoken against slavery during the American Civil War.

== Nazi collaboration ==
At the same time, however, Krepper became a fanatical Nazi. He was a member of the German American Bund and the German American Business League, which supported boycotting Jewish businesses. In 1935, Krepper went to Germany. He returned to the U.S. as a spy in 1941. In 1942, during Operation Pastorius, Krepper helped establish safehouses in New Jersey for the saboteurs of the mission. His name was one of several written on handkerchiefs given to George John Dasch and Edward Kerling.

Due to a lack of evidence, Krepper was not arrested when the plot was exposed by Dasch and Ernest Peter Burger. In December 1944, he was arrested after a sting operation by the Federal Bureau of Investigation. J. Edgar Hoover had wanted to use Krepper as a double agent, but was unsuccessful due to Krepper's commitment to Nazism. In February 1945, Krepper was found guilty on one count of trading with the enemy, for which he faced up to 20 years in prison. The following month, he was also found guilty of conspiracy to commit sabotage and violate wartime censorship laws, for which he faced up to two years in prison.

Krepper was ultimately sentenced to 12 years in prison. He was sent to the United States Penitentiary in Lewisburg, Pennsylvania to serve his sentence. The government also charged Krepper with three additional counts of conspiracy, for which he faced an additional 32 years in prison. However, the charges were dismissed, albeit Krepper's appeals were unsuccessful.

Krepper was paroled on February 3, 1951. Further attempts by him to secure a pardon or have his conviction overturned failed. He remained on parole until 1957. Krepper moved to the Berkshires, where one of his girlfriends owned property. He managed to secure Social Security benefits and a pension from the German Lutheran Church. Krepper died of bronchopneumonia at a nursing home in Great Barrington, Massachusetts, on June 21, 1972.
