= Operation Pastorius =

1942 failed German sabotage in the U.S. during WWII

- Part of the American Theater of World War II
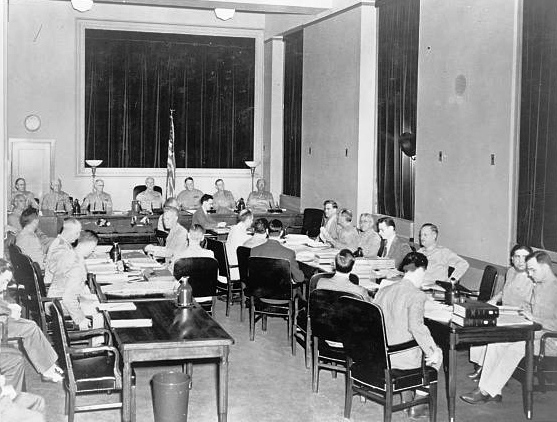
- The trial of the captured Germans, July 1942.
- Objective: Sabotage American economic infrastructure
- Date: June 1942
- Executed by: Nazi Germany
- Outcome: Failed

Operation Pastorius was a failed German intelligence plan for sabotage inside the United States during World War II. The operation was staged in June 1942 and was to be directed against strategic American economic targets. The operation was named for Francis Daniel Pastorius, the founder of the first organized settlement of Germans in North America. The plan involved eight German saboteurs who had previously spent time in the United States.

The plan quickly failed after two of the agents, George John Dasch and Ernest Peter Burger, defected to the Federal Bureau of Investigation shortly after being deployed, betraying the other six. A military tribunal – whose constitutionality was challenged to the Supreme Court in Ex parte Quirin – sentenced all eight to death later that year. President Franklin D. Roosevelt commuted the sentences of Dasch and Burger, while the other six were executed. In 1948, Dasch and Burger were granted executive clemency by President Harry S. Truman, conditional on their permanent deportation to the American occupation zone in Germany.

Sixteen other people were charged with aiding those in charge of the operation.

== Background ==
After the Japanese attack on Pearl Harbor on 7 December 1941, followed by Germany's declaration of war on the United States four days later, and the United States' declaration of war on Germany in response, Hitler authorized a mission to sabotage the American war effort and attack civilian targets to demoralize the American civilian population inside the United States. The mission was given to Abwehr chief Admiral Wilhelm Canaris, the head of German military intelligence. During World War I he had organized the sabotage of French installations in Morocco, and other German agents entered the United States to attack New York arms factories, including the destruction of munitions supplies at Black Tom Island, in 1916. He hoped that Operation Pastorius would have the same kind of success.

== Agents ==
Recruited for Operation Pastorius were eight Germans who had lived in the United States. Two of them, Ernst Burger and Herbert Haupt, were American citizens. The others, George John Dasch, Edward John Kerling, Richard Quirin, Heinrich Harm Heinck, Hermann Otto Neubauer and Werner Thiel, had worked at various jobs in the United States. With the exception of Dasch, all of the men were members of the German American Bund and/or Nazi Party. Neubauer had served in the German Army on the Eastern Front.

All eight were recruited into the Abwehr and were given three weeks of intensive sabotage training in the German High Command school on an estate at Quenzsee, near Berlin, Germany. The agents were instructed in the manufacture and use of explosives, incendiaries, primers, and various forms of mechanical, chemical and electrical delayed-timing devices. Considerable time was spent developing complete background "histories" they were to use in the United States. They were encouraged to converse in English and to read American newspapers and magazines to improve their English and familiarity with current American events and culture.

=== The team ===
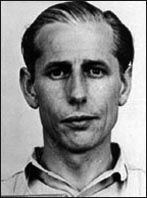
George John Dasch

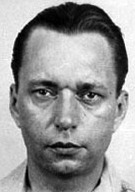
Ernest Peter Burger

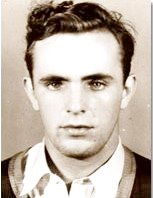
Herbert Hans Haupt

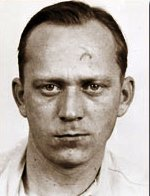
Heinrich Heinck

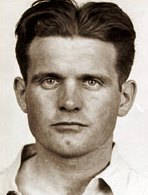
Edward John Kerling

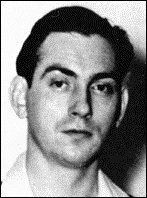
Hermann Otto Neubauer

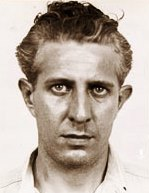
Richard Quirin

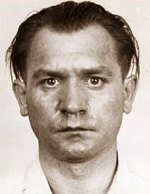
Werner Thiel

== Mission ==
Their mission was to sabotage American economic targets: hydroelectric plants at Niagara Falls; the Aluminum Company of America's plants in Illinois, Tennessee, and New York; locks on the Ohio River, near Louisville, Kentucky; Pennsalt Chemicals (then the Pennsylvania Salt Manufacturing Company) in Cornwells Heights (Bensalem), Pennsylvania; the Pennsylvania Railroad's Horseshoe Curve, a crucial railroad pass near Altoona, Pennsylvania, as well as their repair shops at Altoona; the Pennsalt cryolite (a raw material in the production of fluorine and aluminum) plant in Philadelphia; Hell Gate Bridge in New York; Pennsylvania Station in Newark, New Jersey; And the Baltimore and Ohio Railroad’s Falls Cut tunnel near Fairhope Township, Pennsylvania. The agents were also instructed to spread a wave of terror by planting explosives on bridges, railroad stations, water facilities, public places, and Jewish-owned shops. They were given counterfeit birth certificates, Social Security cards, draft deferment cards, nearly $175,000 in American money, and driver's licenses, and put aboard two U-boats to land on the east coast of the U.S.

Even before the mission began, it was in danger of being compromised, as George Dasch, commander of the team, left confidential documents on a train, and one of the agents, while drunk, announced to patrons in a Paris tavern that he was a secret agent.

On the night of 12/13 June 1942, the first submarine to arrive in the U.S., U-202 commanded by Captain Hans-Heinz Lindner, landed at Amagansett, New York, about 100 miles east of New York City on Long Island, at what is now Atlantic Avenue beach. It was carrying Dasch and three other saboteurs (Burger, Quirin, and Heinck). The team was launched in inflatable rafts (in which Dasch nearly drowned) and came ashore wearing German Navy uniforms so that, if they were captured, they would be classified as prisoners of war rather than spies. They also brought their explosives, primers and incendiaries, and buried them along with their uniforms, and put on civilian clothes to begin an expected two-year campaign in the sabotage of American defense-related production.

Immediately upon reaching the beach, at around 30 minutes past midnight the saboteurs were discovered amidst the dunes by unarmed Coast Guard Seaman John C. Cullen, who was accosted by Dasch and offered a bribe of $300. (Cullen had been shortchanged, the money only amounted to $260.) Cullen feigned cooperation but reported the encounter. An armed patrol returned to the site, finding "four crates of explosives and some German uniforms that had been hastily buried in the wet sand", as well as fuses and pre-made bombs; but the Germans were gone, having taken the Long Island Rail Road from the Amagansett station into Manhattan, where they checked into a hotel. The FBI, informed of the operation by the Coast Guard, initiated a manhunt for the saboteurs.

U-202 itself remained stuck in the sand merely 200 metres (660 ft) offshore until daybreak; only when the tide came in was the submarine able to free itself and return to the depths of the ocean. Later that month, U-202 would sink two civilian ships: the Argentine steamer Rio Tercero and the American passenger liner City of Birmingham, before returning to Europe.

The other four-member German team, commanded by Kerling, landed without incident at Ponte Vedra Beach, Florida, south of Jacksonville on 16 June 1942. They came on U-584. This group came ashore wearing bathing suits, but wore German Navy hats. After landing ashore, they threw away their hats, put on civilian clothes, and started their mission by boarding trains to Chicago, Illinois and Cincinnati, Ohio. Additional breaches of secrecy occurred; Kerling had boasted to a colleague about their mission, and in Chicago, Herbert Haupt had asked his father to buy him a sports car claiming he needed it while traveling on business for the German government.

The two teams were to meet on 4 July in a hotel in Cincinnati to coordinate their sabotage operations.

== Betrayal ==
While in the Manhattan hotel, Dasch — clearly unnerved by the encounter with the Coast Guard — called Burger into their upper-story hotel room and opened a window, saying they would talk, and if they disagreed, "only one of us will walk out that door—the other will fly out this window." Dasch told him he had no intention of going through with the mission, hated Nazism, and planned to report the plot to the FBI. Burger agreed to defect to the United States immediately.

On 15 June, Dasch phoned the New York office of the FBI, gave his name as "Franz Pastorius" (the namesake of the operation), and explained the plot, but ended the call when the agent answering doubted his story and thought he was a crackpot. Four days later, he took a train to Washington, DC and walked into FBI headquarters, where he gained the attention of Assistant Director D.M. Ladd by showing him the operation's budget of $84,000 cash. None of the other six German agents were aware of the betrayal. During the next two weeks, Burger and the other six were arrested. Dasch hoped that he would be hailed as a hero for exposing the plot, but the FBI had other plans; J. Edgar Hoover made no mention of him and claimed credit for the FBI for capturing the saboteurs.

== Trial and executions ==
Since they were caught before they could do anything, officials were initially unsure on how to proceed against the saboteurs. Attorney General Francis Biddle estimated that at best, the German saboteurs could be convicted of conspiracy and face up to three years in prison, while Burger and Haupt could be tried for treason. His alternative proposal was imprisoning them as POWs for the remainder of the war. However, Roosevelt deemed these proposals unacceptable. He said the Americans were guilty of treason and thus liable to courts-martial. As for the Germans, he said they had forfeited their right to civilian trials since they were "waging battle within our country." Roosevelt then said he wanted all of the saboteurs to be immediately executed. To accomplish this, he told Biddle that he would use his presidential powers to convene a military tribunal to prosecute the saboteurs, something not done on American soil since the end of the American Civil War. He sent another memo to Biddle, reaffirming his expectations.

"I want one thing clearly understood, Francis. I won't hand them over to any United States marshal armed with a writ of habeas corpus. Understand?"

On 2 July 1942, President Roosevelt issued Executive Proclamation 2561, creating a military tribunal to prosecute the Germans.

Placed before a seven-member military commission, the Germans were charged with the following offenses:

- Violating the law of war;
- Violating Article 81 of the Articles of War, defining the offense of corresponding with or giving intelligence to the enemy;
- Violating Article 82 of the Articles of War, defining the offense of spying; and
- Conspiracy to commit the offenses alleged in the first three charges.

=== Members of the Military Tribunal ===
- Maj. Gen. Frank Ross McCoy, President
- Maj. Gen. Walter S. Grant
- Maj. Gen. Blanton Winship
- Maj. Gen. Lorenzo D. Gasser
- Maj. Gen. Guy V. Henry Jr.
- Brig. Gen. John T. Lewis
- Brig. Gen. John T. Kennedy

The trial was held in Assembly Hall #1 on the fifth floor of the Department of Justice building in Washington, D.C., on 8 July 1942. Lawyers for the accused, who included Lauson Stone and Kenneth Royall, attempted to have the case tried in a civilian court but were rebuffed by the United States Supreme Court in Ex parte Quirin, a case that was later cited as a precedent for the trial by military commission of any unlawful combatant against the United States.

The trial for the eight defendants ended on 1 August 1942. Two days later, all were found guilty and sentenced to death. Roosevelt commuted Burger's sentence to life in prison and Dasch's to 30 years because they had surrendered themselves and provided information about the others. The others were executed on 8 August 1942 in the electric chair on the third floor of the District of Columbia jail and buried in a potter's field in the Blue Plains neighborhood in the Anacostia area of Washington.

== Aftermath ==
The failure of Operation Pastorius caused Hitler to rebuke Admiral Canaris and no sabotage attempt was ever made again in the United States. During the remaining years of the war, the Germans only once more dispatched agents to the United States by submarine. In November 1944, as part of Operation Elster, the German submarine U-1230 left two SS-Reichssicherheitshauptamt (Reich Security Main Office) spies on the coast of Maine to gather intelligence concerning North American manufacturing and technical progress. After a month of high living in New York City, but no espionage gathering, one of the men turned himself in to the FBI, which captured both agents soon afterward. Both were convicted and sentenced to death, with their executions stayed throughout the duration of the war, after which their punishment was commuted by President Truman into life sentences in prison. One man was paroled in 1955, the other in 1960.

In 1948, President Harry S. Truman granted executive clemency to Dasch and Burger on the condition that they be deported to the American occupation zone in Germany. In Germany they were regarded as traitors who had caused the death of their comrades. Dasch died in 1991 at the age of 89 in Ludwigshafen, Germany. Burger died in 1975.

Sixteen people, including Herbert Haupt's mother and father, were arrested for aiding the saboteurs. The last person to be arrested was Lutheran Pastor Carl Krepper, a member of the German American Bund and the German American Business League, which supported boycotting Jewish businesses. Krepper had helped establish safehouses for the saboteurs. In March 1945, he was found guilty of trading with the enemy and conspiracy to commit sabotage and sentenced to 12 years in prison. Krepper was paroled in 1951, and died in 1972.

For his part in the affair, Seaman John Cullen was awarded the coxswain insignia, featured on the front page of the New York Times, and received the Legion of Merit medal. His wedding in 1944 made the newspapers and attracted turnout "well beyond the intended guests". Cullen died in 2011, at the age of 90.

Sometime during the 1960s or 1970s, the National Socialist White People's Party placed an unauthorized monument to the executed spies in a thicket in southwest Washington, D.C., on National Park Service land. It went largely unknown and ignored for several decades; the Park Service removed it in 2010.

== See also ==
- Duquesne Spy Ring in 1941.
- Grams, Grant W. "Enemies within our bosom: Nazi Sabotage in Canada." Journal of Military and Strategic Studies 14, no. 3 & 4 (2012).
- Grams, Grant W. Coming home to the Third Reich: return migration of German nationals from the United States and Canada, 1933–1941. McFarland, 2021.
- Grams, Grant W. “Nazi Sabotage in Canada in 1939, Wolfgang Alexander Hauffe and the Consolidated Mining and Smelter in Trail, British Columbia”, in Leanne Coughlin (ed) B.C. Studies, 2026.
- They Came to Blow Up America, a 1943 movie based on Operation Pastorius, featuring George Sanders.
- Saboteur, a 1942 movie concerning acts of sabotage on the U.S. mainland during World War II.
- The Ninth Man, a novel of the 1970s written by John Lee, fictional story of a ninth agent, who evaded capture.
- History of homeland security in the United States
