= List of people executed in the United States in 1942 =

One hundred and forty-eight people, one hundred and forty-seven male and one female, were executed in the United States in 1942, one hundred and nineteen by electrocution, twenty by gas chamber, eight by hanging, and one by firing squad.

Six Nazi saboteurs were executed by the federal government for their roles in Operation Pastorius. One of them, Herbert Hans Haupt, was an American citizen, making him the only American citizen to be executed by the United States for collaborating with the Axis powers. The military carried out its first wartime execution of World War II, that of Private James Rowe for the murder of a fellow soldier.

== List of people executed in the United States in 1942 ==
No.	Date of execution	Name	Age of person			Gender	Ethnicity	State	Method	Ref.
No.	Date of execution	Name	At execution	At offense	Age difference	Gender	Ethnicity	State	Method	Ref.
1	January 6, 1942	George L. Foulds Jr.	23	22	1	Male	White	New Jersey	Electrocution	
2	January 8, 1942	Isaac Richardson	28	27	1	Male	Black	New York	Electrocution	
3	January 9, 1942	Albert Dyer	34	32	2	Male	White	Alabama	Electrocution	
4	January 9, 1942	Ralph W. Ernest	33	Unknown	Unknown	Male	White	Delaware	Hanging	
5	January 9, 1942	James Arthur Yount	60	59	1	Male	White	Mississippi	Electrocution	
6	January 9, 1942	Roland Paul Wescott	21	20	1	Male	White	North Carolina	Gas chamber	
7	January 15, 1942	Earl Parks	26	25	1	Male	Black	Illinois	Electrocution	
8	January 15, 1942	Henry Ancrum	31	29	2	Male	Black	New York	Electrocution	
9	January 15, 1942	Ralph G. Jones	35	33	2	Male	Black	New York	Electrocution	
10	January 16, 1942	William Henry Diggs	24	24	0	Male	Black	Virginia	Electrocution	
11	January 16, 1942	Charles T. Johnson Jr.	19	19	0	Male	Black	Virginia	Electrocution	
12	January 17, 1942	Bernard Gudwik Sawicki	19	19	0	Male	White	Illinois	Electrocution	
13	January 21, 1942	Wayne R. Thompson	24	23	1	Male	White	Ohio	Electrocution	
14	January 22, 1942	Arturo Renna	36	32	4	Male	Hispanic	New York	Electrocution	
15	January 23, 1942	Dock Powell	27	27	0	Male	Black	Alabama	Electrocution	
16	January 23, 1942	Jimmie Herron	Unknown	Unknown	Unknown	Male	Black	Arkansas	Electrocution	
17	January 28, 1942	Nehemiah Glover	28	26	2	Male	Black	Texas	Electrocution	
18	January 29, 1942	Thomas Conroy	39	38	1	Male	White	New York	Electrocution	
19	January 30, 1942	James Shivers	38	Unknown	Unknown	Male	Black	Georgia	Electrocution	
20	January 31, 1942	Charlie Strickland	25	24	1	Male	Black	Georgia	Electrocution	
21	February 6, 1942	Edward Leroy Morton	28	25	3	Male	Black	Georgia	Electrocution	
22	February 9, 1942	J. D. Tuggle	23	21	2	Male	White	Oklahoma	Electrocution	
23	February 10, 1942	Virginius Carter	33	32	1	Male	White	Indiana	Electrocution	
24	February 13, 1942	Roy Sturdivant	29	Unknown	Unknown	Male	Black	North Carolina	Gas chamber	
25	February 13, 1942	Roy Alex Walden	38	37	1	Male	White	Tennessee	Electrocution	
26	February 14, 1942	Ernest Tipton Dixon	24	22	2	Male	White	Tennessee	Electrocution	
27	February 14, 1942	John Dockery	20	18	2	Male	White	Tennessee	Electrocution	
28	February 15, 1942	Richard Robinson	38	Unknown	Unknown	Male	Black	Texas	Electrocution	
29	February 19, 1942	Frank Abbandando	31	26	5	Male	White	New York	Electrocution	
30	February 19, 1942	Harry Maione	33	28	5	Male	White	New York	Electrocution	
31	February 20, 1942	James Satterfield	35	33	2	Male	Black	Kentucky	Electrocution	
32	February 20, 1942	George Thomas	30	29	1	Male	Black	South Carolina	Electrocution	
33	February 22, 1942	Charlie Goldsby	37	37	0	Male	Black	Texas	Electrocution	
34	February 26, 1942	George Joseph Cvek	24	23	1	Male	White	New York	Electrocution	
35	March 2, 1942	George Newsome	29	29	0	Male	Black	Florida	Electrocution	
36	March 5, 1942	Morris Mardavich	24	23	1	Male	White	New York	Electrocution	
37	March 6, 1942	John Miller	35	Unknown	Unknown	Male	Black	Georgia	Electrocution	
38	March 10, 1942	Robert Cox	31	30	1	Male	Black	New Jersey	Electrocution	
39	March 11, 1942	Howard P. Cone	24	23	1	Male	White	Georgia	Electrocution	
40	March 12, 1942	Anthony Esposito	37	35	2	Male	White	New York	Electrocution	
41	March 12, 1942	William Esposito	29	27	2	Male	White	New York	Electrocution	
42	March 13, 1942	Esker Washington Gibson	32	31	1	Male	White	Alabama	Electrocution	
43	March 13, 1942	Bud Phelps Herring	69	67	2	Male	Black	Alabama	Electrocution	
44	March 13, 1942	Monroe Bounds	30	23	7	Male	Black	South Carolina	Electrocution	
45	March 20, 1942	John Anthony Soto	17	16	1	Male	Hispanic	Oregon	Gas chamber	
46	March 20, 1942	John Henry Goode	Unknown	Unknown	Unknown	Male	Black	Tennessee	Electrocution	
47	March 20, 1942	Clarence May	33	32	1	Male	White	Tennessee	Electrocution	
48	March 22, 1942	Rogers Lee King	19	18	1	Male	Black	Texas	Electrocution	
49	March 23, 1942	Worth Roberson	27	22	5	Male	White	Florida	Electrocution	
50	March 23, 1942	Angelo Michael Ciangetti	49	47	2	Male	White	Florida	Electrocution	
51	March 23, 1942	Jecy Crawford	28	25	3	Male	Black	Florida	Electrocution	
52	March 23, 1942	Walter Roberson	42	41	1	Male	Black	Florida	Electrocution	
53	March 27, 1942	Eugene Burnam	18	15	3	Male	Black	Kentucky	Electrocution	
54	April 10, 1942	Dewey Clark	30	28	2	Male	Black	California	Gas chamber	
55	April 10, 1942	Henry E. Jones	52	50	2	Male	Black	California	Gas chamber	
56	April 24, 1942	Ernest Tyler Jr.	36	35	1	Male	Black	Missouri	Gas chamber	
57	May 1, 1942	Clarence Hardy	42	Unknown	Unknown	Male	Black	Alabama	Electrocution	
58	May 1, 1942	Ed Hayes Jr.	34	34	0	Male	Black	Alabama	Electrocution	
59	May 1, 1942	Major Raymond Lisenba	48	41	7	Male	White	California	Hanging	
60	May 8, 1942	Wilbur Pritchett	37	Unknown	Unknown	Male	Black	Maryland	Hanging	
61	May 8, 1942	James Benjamin Alford	26	25	1	Male	White	Texas	Electrocution	
62	May 13, 1942	Leo Jordan	23	23	0	Male	White	Illinois	Electrocution	
63	May 15, 1942	Norman Williams	28	24	4	Male	White	Georgia	Electrocution	
64	May 16, 1942	McKinley Morris	23	22	1	Male	Black	Texas	Electrocution	
65	May 18, 1942	John A. Stanton	44	Unknown	Unknown	Male	White	Florida	Electrocution	
66	May 22, 1942	Martin Sukle	40	38	2	Male	White	Colorado	Gas chamber	
67	June 5, 1942	Benjamin Franklin Adams	46	45	1	Male	White	Arkansas	Electrocution	
68	June 5, 1942	Robert Williams	23	22	1	Male	Black	Kentucky	Electrocution	
69	June 5, 1942	Frank Haywood	32	Unknown	Unknown	Male	Black	Maryland	Hanging	
70	June 11, 1942	Charles McGale	45	44	1	Male	White	New York	Electrocution	
71	June 11, 1942	Joseph Riordan	28	26	2	Male	White	New York	Electrocution	
72	June 15, 1942	James Durrell Baker	32	26	6	Male	Black	Florida	Electrocution	
73	June 15, 1942	Clyde W. Hysler	26	20	6	Male	White	Florida	Electrocution	
74	June 15, 1942	Orrin J. Brown	55	54	1	Male	White	Texas	Electrocution	
75	June 26, 1942	William M. Patterson	25	Unknown	Unknown	Male	Black	Alabama	Electrocution	
76	June 26, 1942	William Nelms Snead	34	Unknown	Unknown	Male	Black	Alabama	Electrocution	
77	June 30, 1942	James Nickerson	24	22	2	Male	White	Massachusetts	Electrocution	
78	June 30, 1942	Paul Giacomazza	19	17	2	Male	White	Massachusetts	Electrocution	
79	July 2, 1942	Dock Moore	25	24	1	Male	Black	Georgia	Electrocution	
80	July 2, 1942	Odell Waller	25	23	2	Male	Black	Virginia	Electrocution	
81	July 5, 1942	Luther Hill	28	27	1	Male	Black	Texas	Electrocution	
82	July 10, 1942	Paul Mealer	41	39	2	Male	White	Alabama	Electrocution	
83	July 10, 1942	S. T. Mosley	23	20	3	Male	Black	Georgia	Electrocution	
84	July 10, 1942	Andrew Henry	54	Unknown	Unknown	Male	Black	Maryland	Hanging	
85	July 10, 1942	Cyrus Pinckney	30	28	2	Male	Black	South Carolina	Electrocution	
86	July 20, 1942	Byrd L. Hudgins	23	22	1	Male	White	Florida	Electrocution	
87	July 20, 1942	Willie Monroe Williams	27	26	1	Male	Black	Florida	Electrocution	
88	July 22, 1942	Buffert Ray Doney	48	47	1	Male	White	Ohio	Electrocution	
89	July 24, 1942	Charles Benjamin	23	Unknown	Unknown	Male	Black	Maryland	Hanging	
90	July 24, 1942	Edward Wofford	27	Unknown	Unknown	Male	Black	Maryland	Hanging	
91	July 24, 1942	Walter Orville Merikle	22	21	1	Male	White	Mississippi	Electrocution	
92	July 29, 1942	Edward Hart Jr.	25	24	1	Male	Black	Texas	Electrocution	
93	July 30, 1942	Donald Lawton Condit	25	24	1	Male	White	Utah	Firing squad	
94	July 31, 1942	A. T. Jones	Unknown	Unknown	Unknown	Male	Black	Arkansas	Electrocution	
95	July 31, 1942	Percy Flemings	24	Unknown	Unknown	Male	Black	Mississippi	Electrocution	
96	July 31, 1942	Lawrence Wright	20	Unknown	Unknown	Male	Black	Mississippi	Electrocution	
97	August 1, 1942	Ben Walker	35	Unknown	Unknown	Male	Black	Texas	Electrocution	
98	August 7, 1942	Maurice Louis Briggs	26	25	1	Male	White	California	Gas chamber	
99	August 7, 1942	James Lee Robertson	25	25	0	Male	Black	Kentucky	Electrocution	
100	August 7, 1942	Arthur Gibson	32	31	1	Male	Black	North Carolina	Gas chamber	
101	August 7, 1942	Richard Gaymon	22	22	0	Male	Black	South Carolina	Electrocution	
102	August 8, 1942	Herbert Hans Haupt	22	22	0	Male	White	Federal government	Electrocution	
103	August 8, 1942	Heinrich Harm Heinck	35	34	1	Male	White	Federal government	Electrocution	
104	August 8, 1942	Edward John Kerling	33	33	0	Male	White	Federal government	Electrocution	
105	August 8, 1942	Hermann Otto Neubauer	32	32	0	Male	White	Federal government	Electrocution	
106	August 8, 1942	Richard Quirin	34	34	0	Male	White	Federal government	Electrocution	
107	August 8, 1942	Werner Thiel	35	35	0	Male	White	Federal government	Electrocution	
108	August 8, 1942	Emiliano Benevidez	31	29	2	Male	Hispanic	Texas	Electrocution	
109	August 10, 1942	William Kennie Wilson	21	20	1	Male	Black	Pennsylvania	Electrocution	
110	August 17, 1942	Ernest James Robinson	20	18	2	Male	Black	Florida	Electrocution	
111	August 21, 1942	Steve Crimm	26	25	1	Male	Black	California	Gas chamber	
112	August 21, 1942	Walter Kirby Smith Sr.	64	63	1	Male	White	North Carolina	Gas chamber	
113	August 28, 1942	Jess Sanders	56	55	1	Male	Black	Kentucky	Electrocution	
114	August 28, 1942	Otis Peter Smith	30	28	2	Male	Black	Kentucky	Electrocution	
115	August 28, 1942	John A. Kramer	63	61	2	Male	White	Nevada	Gas chamber	
116	September 2, 1942	C. L. Turner	36	35	1	Male	Black	Texas	Electrocution	
117	September 9, 1942	Willie Larkin	31	Unknown	Unknown	Male	Black	Louisiana	Electrocution	
118	September 10, 1942	Carlo Barone	22	21	1	Male	White	New York	Electrocution	
119	September 10, 1942	Edward Hicks	21	19	2	Male	Black	New York	Electrocution	
120	September 11, 1942	Alchrist Grant	31	29	2	Male	Black	South Carolina	Electrocution	
121	September 17, 1942	James Clark	22	21	1	Male	Black	New York	Electrocution	
122	September 17, 1942	Lawrence Edwards	19	18	1	Male	Black	New York	Electrocution	
123	September 17, 1942	Manuel Jacinto	48	47	1	Male	Hispanic	New York	Electrocution	
124	September 18, 1942	John Pantano	20	19	1	Male	White	Illinois	Electrocution	
125	September 24, 1942	Clifton Guillory	20	19	1	Male	Black	Louisiana	Electrocution	
126	October 9, 1942	William Isaac Robinson	34	33	1	Male	Black	District of Columbia	Electrocution	
127	October 16, 1942	Charles E. Martin Jr.	24	23	1	Male	White	Georgia	Electrocution	
128	October 16, 1942	Buster Shaw	20	20	0	Male	Black	Georgia	Electrocution	
129	October 23, 1942	Donald Harry Fearn	27	26	1	Male	White	Colorado	Gas chamber	
130	October 29, 1942	Saul Nolan	31	31	0	Male	Black	Louisiana	Electrocution	
131	October 30, 1942	David Herman Allen	36	36	0	Male	White	North Carolina	Gas chamber	
132	October 30, 1942	Otis Harris	17	16	1	Male	Black	North Carolina	Gas chamber	
133	November 6, 1942	James Rowe	36	36	0	Male	Black	U.S. military	Hanging	
134	November 13, 1942	Delmar Arnold	26	24	2	Male	White	California	Gas chamber	
135	November 13, 1942	Barzen Hoyt	24	22	2	Male	White	California	Gas chamber	
136	November 13, 1942	William Long	31	Unknown	Unknown	Male	Black	North Carolina	Gas chamber	
137	November 20, 1942	Stoney Allison	19	18	1	Male	Black	Arkansas	Electrocution	
138	November 20, 1942	A. D. Luckyado	34	34	0	Male	Black	Arkansas	Electrocution	
139	November 20, 1942	Arthur Wayne Frazier	24	22	2	Male	White	California	Gas chamber	
140	November 26, 1942	W. Z. Lewis	26	26	0	Male	Black	Georgia	Electrocution	
141	November 28, 1942	Annie Beatrice Henry	26	24	2	Female	White	Louisiana	Electrocution	
142	December 1, 1942	George L. Iles	22	21	1	Male	Black	Louisiana	Electrocution	
143	December 3, 1942	William Hamilton	17	17	0	Male	Black	Louisiana	Electrocution	
144	December 4, 1942	Alfred Horace Wells	32	31	1	Male	White	California	Gas chamber	
145	December 11, 1942	Zonnie Frasier	19	19	0	Male	Black	South Carolina	Electrocution	
146	December 11, 1942	John K. Robinson	18	17	1	Male	White	South Carolina	Electrocution	
147	December 17, 1942	Sylvester Brown	35	34	1	Male	Black	Mississippi	Electrocution	
148	December 18, 1942	William Thomas Mumford	22	22	0	Male	Black	District of Columbia	Electrocution	

== Demographics ==
Gender
Male	147	99%
Female	1	1%
Ethnicity
Black	82	55%
White	62	42%
Hispanic	4	3%
State
New York	18	12%
Texas	12	8%
Florida	11	7%
Georgia	11	7%
Alabama	9	6%
California	9	6%
North Carolina	7	5%
South Carolina	7	5%
Federal government	6	4%
Kentucky	6	4%
Louisiana	6	4%
Arkansas	5	3%
Maryland	5	3%
Mississippi	5	3%
Tennessee	5	3%
Illinois	4	3%
Virginia	3	2%
Colorado	2	1%
District of Columbia	2	1%
Massachusetts	2	1%
New Jersey	2	1%
Ohio	2	1%
Delaware	1	1%
Indiana	1	1%
Missouri	1	1%
Nevada	1	1%
Oklahoma	1	1%
Oregon	1	1%
Pennsylvania	1	1%
U.S. military	1	1%
Utah	1	1%
Method
Electrocution	119	80%
Gas chamber	20	14%
Hanging	8	5%
Firing squad	1	1%
Month
January	20	14%
February	14	9%
March	19	13%
April	3	2%
May	10	7%
June	12	8%
July	18	12%
August	19	13%
September	10	7%
October	7	5%
November	9	5%
December	7	5%
Age
Unknown	3	2%
10–19	12	8%
20–29	65	44%
30–39	49	33%
40–49	11	7%
50–59	4	3%
60–69	4	3%
Total	148	100%

== Executions in recent years ==
Number of executions
1943	138
1942	148
1941	123
Total	408

Preceded by 1941	List of people executed in the United States in 1942	Succeeded by 1943
