= List of people executed by the United States federal government =

The following is a list of people executed by the United States federal government.

== Post-Gregg executions ==
Sixteen executions (none of them military) have occurred in the modern post-Gregg era. Since 1976, 16 people have been executed under federal jurisdiction by the United States federal government. All were executed by lethal injection at the United States Penitentiary in Terre Haute, Indiana.

No.	Name	Race	Age	Sex	Date of execution	Federal District	Method	Offense	Victim(s)	President
1	Timothy James McVeigh	White	33	M	June 11, 2001	Western District of Oklahoma	Lethal injection	Murder of a federal employee	8 federal law enforcement officers (Note: McVeigh was also responsible for the killing of 160 additional people and injuring over 680 others through the 1995 bombing of the Alfred P. Murrah Federal Building.)	George W. Bush
2	Juan Raul Garza	Hispanic	44	M	June 19, 2001	Southern District of Texas	Lethal injection	Murder in furtherance of a continuing criminal enterprise	Thomas Albert Rumbo, Gilberto Matos, and Erasmo De La Fuente (Note: The jury also found beyond a reasonable doubt that Garza was responsible for the murders of Antonio Nieto, Bernabe Sosa, Diana Flores Villareal, Oscar Cantu, and Fernando Escobar Garcia.)	George W. Bush
3	Louis Jones Jr.	Black	53	M	March 18, 2003	Northern District of Texas	Lethal injection	Murder on a military reservation	U.S. Army Private Tracie Joy McBride	George W. Bush
4	Daniel Lewis Lee	White	47	M	July 14, 2020	Eastern District of Arkansas	Lethal injection	Murder in aid of racketeering	William Frederick Mueller, Nancy Ann Mueller, and Sarah Elizabeth Powell	Donald Trump
5	Wesley Ira Purkey	White	68	M	July 16, 2020	Western District of Missouri	Lethal injection	Kidnapping and murder	Jennifer Long (Note: Purkey was also responsible for the murder of Mary Ruth Bales.)	Donald Trump
6	Dustin Lee Honken	White	52	M	July 17, 2020	Northern District of Iowa	Lethal injection	Murder in furtherance of a continuing criminal enterprise	5 murder victims (Note: The 5 victims were: Greg Nicholson, Lori Ann Duncan, Kandace Duncan, Amber Duncan, and Terry DeGeus.)	Donald Trump
7	Lezmond Charles Mitchell	Native American	38	M	August 26, 2020	District of Arizona	Lethal injection	Carjacking and murder	Alyce Slim and Tiffany Lee	Donald Trump
8	Keith Dwayne Nelson	White	45	M	August 28, 2020	Western District of Missouri	Lethal injection	Kidnapping and murder	Pamela Butler	Donald Trump
9	William Emmett LeCroy Jr.	White	50	M	September 22, 2020	Northern District of Georgia	Lethal injection	Carjacking and murder	Joann Lee Tiesler	Donald Trump
10	Christopher Andre Vialva	Black	40	M	September 24, 2020	Western District of Texas	Lethal injection	Murder on federal property	Todd Bagley and Stacie Bagley	Donald Trump
11	Orlando Cordia Hall	Black	49	M	November 19, 2020	Northern District of Texas	Lethal injection	Kidnapping and murder	Lisa Rene	Donald Trump
12	Brandon Anthony Micah Bernard	Black	40	M	December 10, 2020	Western District of Texas	Lethal injection	Murder on federal property	Todd Bagley and Stacie Bagley	Donald Trump
13	Alfred Bourgeois	Black	56	M	December 11, 2020	Southern District of Texas	Lethal injection	Murder on a military reservation	Jakaren Harrison	Donald Trump
14	Lisa Marie Montgomery	White	52	F	January 13, 2021	Western District of Missouri	Lethal injection	Kidnapping and murder	Bobbie Jo Stinnett	Donald Trump
15	Corey Johnson	Black	52	M	January 14, 2021	Eastern District of Virginia	Lethal injection	Murder in furtherance of a continuing criminal enterprise	7 murder victims (Note: The 7 victims were: Louis Johnson, Bobby Long, Anthony Carter, Dorothy Armstrong, Curtis Thorne, Linwood Chiles, and Peyton Johnson.)	Donald Trump
16	Dustin John Higgs	Black	48	M	January 16, 2021	District of Maryland	Lethal injection	Murder on federal property	Tamika Black, Tanji Jackson, and Mishann Chinn	Donald Trump

=== Demographics ===
Race
Black	7	44%
White	7	44%
Hispanic	1	6%
Native American	1	6%
Age
30–39	2	13%
40–49	7	44%
50–59	6	38%
60–69	1	6%
Sex
Male	15	94%
Female	1	6%
Date of execution
1976–1979	0	0%
1980–1989	0	0%
1990–1999	0	0%
2000–2009	3	19%
2010–2019	0	0%
2020–2029	13	81%
Method
Lethal injection	16	100%
President (Party)
Gerald Ford (R)	0	0%
Jimmy Carter (D)	0	0%
Ronald Reagan (R)	0	0%
George H. W. Bush (R)	0	0%
Bill Clinton (D)	0	0%
George W. Bush (R)	3	19%
Barack Obama (D)	0	0%
Donald Trump (R)	13	81%
Joe Biden (D)	0	0%
Donald Trump (R)	0	0%
Total	16	100%

== Earlier non-military executions, 1895 to 1963 ==
From 1790 to 1963, there were at least 332 Federal, 271 Territorial and 40 Indian Tribunal executions according to the most complete records. The youngest person sentenced to death and subsequently executed was James Arcene, who was executed at the age of 23 on June 18, 1885, for his role in a robbery and murder committed when he was 10 years old.

Name	Race	Age	Sex	Date of execution	Offense	Location	Method	Victim(s)	President
Tom Moore	White	33	M	September 28, 1894	Murder in Indian Territory (Note: Because Moore was a non-Indian who committed a crime in the Indian Territory, he was prosecuted by a federal court in North Texas, rather than facing an Indian Tribunal.)	Lamar County Jail, Paris, Texas	Hanging	John McGuire, white	Grover Cleveland
Eugene Fulke	White	19	M	September 28, 1894	Murder in Indian Territory	Lamar County Jail, Paris, Texas	Hanging	Charles Palmer, white	Grover Cleveland
Lewis Holder	White	55	M	November 2, 1894	Murder in Indian Territory	Fort Smith Jail, Fort Smith, Arkansas	Hanging	George Bickford, white	Grover Cleveland
Chief Two Sticks	Native American	??	M	December 28, 1894	Conspiracy to Murder (Note: Believed to have been responsible for the killing of four cowboys in the Pine Ridge Reservation.)	Lawrence County Jail, Deadwood, South Dakota	Hanging	Four unnamed cowboy farmers, white	Grover Cleveland
Hans Hansen	White	??	M	January 18, 1895	Murder on the high seas (Note: Threw a man overboard while sailing from Australia to Hawaii with a crew of fourteen.)	California State Penitentiary, San Quentin, California	Hanging	Maurice Fitzgerald, 30, white	Grover Cleveland
Thomas St. Clair	White	??	M	January 18, 1895	Murder on the high seas	California State Penitentiary, San Quentin, California	Hanging	Maurice Fitzgerald, 30, white	Grover Cleveland
Charles Key	White	38	M	September 13, 1895	Murder in Indian Territory	Lamar County Jail, Paris, Texas	Hanging	Unknown white male	Grover Cleveland
Crawford Goldsby	Native American	20	M	March 17, 1896	Murder in Indian Territory (Note: Because Goldsby's victim was a non-Indian U.S citizen, he was prosecuted by a federal court in Arkansas, rather than facing an Indian Tribunal.)	Fort Smith Jail, Fort Smith, Arkansas	Hanging	Ernest Melton, white	Grover Cleveland
Webber Isaacs	Native American	??	M	April 30, 1896	Murder in Indian Territory	Fort Smith Jail, Fort Smith, Arkansas	Hanging	Mike Cushing, white	Grover Cleveland
George Pierce	White	??	M	April 30, 1896	Murder in Indian Territory	Fort Smith Jail, Fort Smith, Arkansas	Hanging	William Vandever, white	Grover Cleveland
John Pierce	White	??	M	April 30, 1896	Murder in Indian Territory	Fort Smith Jail, Fort Smith, Arkansas	Hanging	William Vandever, white	Grover Cleveland
Rufus Buck	Native American	20	M	July 1, 1896	Rape in Indian Territory (Note: Known as the "Rufus Buck Gang", this group committed at least two murders along with numerous robberies and several other rapes in the two proceeding weeks. Buck and the Davis brothers each received an additional death sentence for the murder of Deputy U.S. Marshal John Garrett. Because two of their victims were Non-Indian U.S citizens, they were all tried by a federal court in Arkansas.)	Fort Smith Jail, Fort Smith, Arkansas	Hanging	Rosetta Hassan, 23, white	Grover Cleveland
Lewis Davis	Native American	??	M	July 1, 1896	Rape in Indian Territory	Fort Smith Jail, Fort Smith, Arkansas	Hanging	Rosetta Hassan, 23, white	Grover Cleveland
Lucky Davis	Black	??	M	July 1, 1896	Rape in Indian Territory	Fort Smith Jail, Fort Smith, Arkansas	Hanging	Rosetta Hassan, 23, white	Grover Cleveland
Maoma July	Native American	??	M	July 1, 1896	Rape in Indian Territory	Fort Smith Jail, Fort Smith, Arkansas	Hanging	Rosetta Hassan, 23, white	Grover Cleveland
Sam Sampson	Native American	??	M	July 1, 1896	Rape in Indian Territory	Fort Smith Jail, Fort Smith, Arkansas	Hanging	Rosetta Hassan, 23, white	Grover Cleveland
George Wilson (Note: Also known as James Casharego)	White	27	M	July 30, 1896	Murder in Indian Territory	Fort Smith Jail, Fort Smith, Arkansas	Hanging	Zachariah W. Thatch, white	Grover Cleveland
George Wheeler	White	37	M	September 4, 1896	Murder in Indian Territory (Note: Because Wheeler was non-Indian who committed a crime in the Indian Territory, he was prosecuted by a federal court in North Texas, rather than facing an Indian Tribunal.)	Lamar County Jail, Paris, Texas	Hanging	Robert McCabe, native american	Grover Cleveland
Hickman Freeman	Black	??	M	September 4, 1896	Murder on the high seas	Lamar County Jail, Paris, Texas	Hanging	Four people (Note: Killed four crew members during a gambling dispute on a shanty boat.)	Grover Cleveland
Silas Lee	Black	??	M	September 4, 1896	Murder on the high seas	Lamar County Jail, Paris, Texas	Hanging	Four people	Grover Cleveland
John Anderson	White	43	M	December 9, 1898	Murder on the high seas (Note: Murdered in the Atlantic Ocean off the coast of Brazil, en route from the River Platte to Boston.)	Norfolk City Jail, Norfolk, Virginia	Hanging	Captain John W. Whitman 44, white and first mate William Wallace Saunders 39, white	William McKinley
Allen Walkingshield	Native American	??	M	October 24, 1902	Murder on an Indian reservation (Note: Rosebud Indian Reservation)	Minnehaha County Jail, Sioux Falls, South Dakota	Hanging	Mrs Ghost-Faced Bear, Native American	Theodore Roosevelt
George Bear	Native American	??	M	December 5, 1902	Murder on an Indian reservation	Minnehaha County Jail, Sioux Falls, South Dakota	Hanging	C Edward Tayloe and John Shaw	Theodore Roosevelt
Charles Barrett	White	??	M	July 17, 1903	Murder	Federal Jail, McAlester, Oklahoma	Hanging	John Hennessey, elderly, white	Theodore Roosevelt
Dora Wright	Black	31	F	July 17, 1903	Murder	Federal Jail, McAlester, Oklahoma	Hanging	Bessie Williams, 7, black (stepdaughter)	Theodore Roosevelt
Rufus Binyon	Black	??	M	September 22, 1905	Murder	Federal Jail, McAlester, Oklahoma	Hanging	Mary Hawthorne, 8, black	Theodore Roosevelt
Grant Williams	Black	??	M	November 3, 1905	Murder	Federal Jail, McAlester, Oklahoma	Hanging	Edward Dolan, white	Theodore Roosevelt
Henry Scott	Black	??	M	July 6, 1906	Murder on the high seas	New Hanover County Jail, Wilmington, North Carolina	Hanging	Five people (Note: Killed five crew members (4 white, 1 black) during a mutiny aboard the vessel the Harry Berwind.)	Theodore Roosevelt
Robert Cotton	Black	??	M	September 4, 1906	Murder	Federal Jail, Vinita, Oklahoma	Hanging	Female, black (wife)	Theodore Roosevelt
John Goodwin	White	27	M	May 13, 1913	Murder on an Indian reservation (Note: San Carlos Apache Indian Reservation)	Gila County Jail, Gila County, Arizona	Hanging	Fred Kibbe and Alfred Hillpot, white	Woodrow Wilson
William Stewart	White	28	M	May 30, 1914	Murder on an Indian reservation	Gila County Jail, Gila County, Arizona	Hanging	Fred Kibbe and Alfred Hillpot, white	Woodrow Wilson
William Turner	Black	50	M	June 24, 1921	Murder on federal property	Henrico County Jail, Henrico County, Virginia	Hanging	T. Morgan Moore, white	Warren Harding
Henry Brown	Black	19	M	September 1, 1921	Murder on federal property (Note: U.S. Naval Academy in Annapolis.)	Baltimore City Jail, Baltimore, Maryland	Hanging	Harriet M. Kavanaugh, white	Warren Harding
Sam Greenhill	Black	36	M	October 9, 1925	Murder on federal property	Lauderdale County Jail, Florence, Alabama	Hanging	Harry Sleeth White, 35, white (police officer)	Calvin Coolidge
George Sujynamie	Native American	26	M	October 10, 1925	Murder on a military reservation	Fort Whipple, Prescott, Arizona	Hanging	Arthur Mark Cavell, 62, white	Calvin Coolidge
James Alderman	White	45	M	August 17, 1929	Murder on the high seas	Coast Guard Base Six, Fort Lauderdale, Florida	Hanging	Victor A. Lamby and Sidney C. Sanderlin, 26, and 30, white (U.S. coastguardsmen) (Note: Also murdered Secret Service agent Robert K. Webster (48, white).)	Herbert Hoover
Carl Panzram	White	39	M	September 5, 1930	Murder	United States Penitentiary (USP), Leavenworth, Kansas	Hanging	Robert George Warnke, 47, white (guard) (Note: Serial killer, linked to 4 other murders and claimed to have murdered 21 people.)	Herbert Hoover
George Barrett	White	49	M	March 24, 1936	Murder of a federal employee (Note: First person to be executed under a law that made it a federal crime to kill a federal agent.)	Marion County Jail, Indiana	Hanging	Nelson B. Klein Sr., 37, white (FBI agent)	Franklin D. Roosevelt
Arthur Gooch	White	27	M	June 19, 1936	Kidnapping (Note: Seriously injured one of the victims, making the kidnappings a capital offense.)	Oklahoma State Penitentiary, McAlester, Oklahoma	Hanging	R.N. Baker and H.R. Marks, white (police officers)	Franklin D. Roosevelt
Earl Gardner	Native American	29	M	July 12, 1936	Murder on an Indian reservation (Note: San Carlos Apache Indian Reservation.)	Coolidge Dam, Gila County, Arizona	Hanging (Note: After Gardner's execution was botched. Congress passed a law stating that all federal executions would be carried out using the method used in the state. Previously, all federal executions had to be carried out by hanging on federal territory.)	Alicia Gardner and Edward Gardner, 21 and 27 days, Native American (wife and son)	Franklin D. Roosevelt
Anthony Chebatoris	White	40	M	July 8, 1938	Murder during a bank robbery	Federal Correctional Institution (FCI), Milan, Michigan (Note: The only person ever to be executed in Michigan since its admission to the Union.)	Hanging	Henry Porter, 50, white	Franklin D. Roosevelt
Henry Seadlund	White	27	M	July 14, 1938	Kidnapping and murder	Cook County Jail, Illinois	Electrocution	Charles Sherman Ross, 72, white (Note: Also murdered his accomplice in the kidnapping, James Atwood Gray.)	Franklin D. Roosevelt
Glenn Applegate	White	46	M	August 12, 1938	Murder of a federal employee	United States Penitentiary (USP), Leavenworth, Kansas	Hanging	Wimberly W. Baker, 27, white (FBI agent)	Franklin D. Roosevelt
Robert Suhay	White	25	M	August 12, 1938	Murder of a federal employee	United States Penitentiary (USP), Leavenworth, Kansas	Hanging	Wimberly W. Baker, 27, white (FBI agent)	Franklin D. Roosevelt
James Dalhover	White	32	M	November 18, 1938	Bank robbery and murder	Indiana State Prison, Michigan City, Indiana	Electrocution	Paul Vincent Minneman, 33, white (state trooper)	Franklin D. Roosevelt
Herbert Hans Haupt	White	22	M	August 8, 1942	Espionage and attempted sabotage as unlawful combatants for Nazi Germany (Note: Tried by a military tribunal for their roles in Operation Pastorius.)	D.C. Jail, Washington, D.C.	Electrocution	N/A	Franklin D. Roosevelt
Richard Quirin	White	35	M	August 8, 1942	Espionage and attempted sabotage as unlawful combatants for Nazi Germany	D.C. Jail, Washington, D.C.	Electrocution	N/A	Franklin D. Roosevelt
Heinrich Heinck	White	34	M	August 8, 1942	Espionage and attempted sabotage as unlawful combatants for Nazi Germany	D.C. Jail, Washington, D.C.	Electrocution	N/A	Franklin D. Roosevelt
Edward Kerling	White	33	M	August 8, 1942	Espionage and attempted sabotage as unlawful combatants for Nazi Germany	D.C. Jail, Washington, D.C.	Electrocution	N/A	Franklin D. Roosevelt
Herman Neubauer	White	32	M	August 8, 1942	Espionage and attempted sabotage as unlawful combatants for Nazi Germany	D.C. Jail, Washington, D.C.	Electrocution	N/A	Franklin D. Roosevelt
Werner Thiel	White	35	M	August 8, 1942	Espionage and attempted sabotage as unlawful combatants for Nazi Germany	D.C. Jail, Washington, D.C.	Electrocution	N/A	Franklin D. Roosevelt
Clyde Arwood	White	41	M	August 14, 1943	Murder of a federal employee	Tennessee State Prison, Nashville, Tennessee	Electrocution	William Milton Pugh, 49, white (federal agent) (Note: Previously convicted of murdering a sheriff's deputy in Tennessee and served roughly 8 years in prison.)	Franklin D. Roosevelt
Henry Ruhl	White	36	M	April 27, 1945	Murder on a military reservation	Wyoming State Penitentiary, Rawlins, Wyoming	Gas inhalation	Matt Katmo, 44, white	Harry S. Truman
David Joseph Watson	Black	24	M	September 15, 1948	Murder on the high seas (Note: Killed a fellow sailor on board the USS Stribling.)	Florida State Prison, near Raiford, Florida	Electrocution	Benjamin Leroy Hobbs, 19, black	Harry S. Truman
Samuel Richard Shockley	White	39	M	December 3, 1948	Murder of a federal employee (Note: Convicted for their roles in the Battle of Alcatraz.)	California State Penitentiary, San Quentin, California	Gas inhalation	William A. Miller, 43, white (guard)	Harry S. Truman
Miran Edgar Thompson	White	30	M	December 3, 1948	Murder of a federal employee	California State Penitentiary, San Quentin, California	Gas inhalation	William A. Miller, 43, white (guard)	Harry S. Truman
Carlos Romero Ochoa	Hispanic	29	M	December 10, 1948	Murder of a federal employee	California State Penitentiary, San Quentin, California	Gas inhalation	Anthony L. Oneto, 30, white (immigration patrol officer)	Harry S. Truman
Julius Rosenberg	White	35	M	June 19, 1953	Espionage (Note: Convicted for spying on behalf of the Soviet Union and leaking American military secrets, including nuclear weapons designs.)	New York State Prison, Sing Sing, Ossining, New York	Electrocution	N/A	Dwight D. Eisenhower
Ethel Rosenberg	White	37	F	June 19, 1953	Espionage	New York State Prison, Sing Sing, Ossining, New York	Electrocution	N/A	Dwight D. Eisenhower
Carl Austin Hall	White	34	M	December 18, 1953	Kidnapping and murder	Missouri State Penitentiary, Jefferson City, Missouri	Gas inhalation	Bobby Greenlease, 6, white	Dwight D. Eisenhower
Bonnie Emily Heady	White	41	F	December 18, 1953	Kidnapping and murder	Missouri State Penitentiary, Jefferson City, Missouri	Gas inhalation	Bobby Greenlease, 6, white	Dwight D. Eisenhower
Gerhard Puff	White	40	M	August 12, 1954	Murder of a federal employee	New York State Prison, Sing Sing, Ossining, New York	Electrocution	Joseph John Brock, 44, white (FBI agent)	Dwight D. Eisenhower
Arthur Ross Brown	White	30	M	February 24, 1956	Kidnapping and murder	Missouri State Penitentiary, Jefferson City, Missouri	Gas inhalation	Wilma Frances Allen, 34, white	Dwight D. Eisenhower
George Krull	White	36	M	August 21, 1957	Rape on federal property	Georgia State Prison, Reidsville, Georgia	Electrocution	Sunie Jones, 52, white	Dwight D. Eisenhower
Michael Krull	White	33	M	August 21, 1957	Rape on federal property	Georgia State Prison, Reidsville, Georgia	Electrocution	Sunie Jones, 52, white	Dwight D. Eisenhower
Victor Feguer	White	27	M	March 15, 1963	Kidnapping and murder	Iowa State Penitentiary, Fort Madison, Iowa	Hanging	Dr. Edward Roy Bartels, 34, white	John F. Kennedy

== Military executions ==
Between 1942 and 1961, a total of 160 soldiers convicted of criminal offences were executed by the U.S. military, most of them during World War II. This figure does not include individuals executed by the U.S. military for varied contraventions of the laws of war during wartime. The most recent person to be executed by the military is U.S. Army Private John A. Bennett, executed on April 13, 1961, for rape and attempted murder. On January 31, 1945, Private Eddie Slovik was the last American soldier to be executed for the military offence of desertion.

== See also ==
- List of death row inmates in the United States § Federal
- Capital punishment by the United States federal government
- Capital punishment in the United States
- List of people executed by the District of Columbia
