= Blue Plains =

Blue Plains may refer to:

- Blue Plains (Washington, D.C.), an historic locale in the United States
- Blue Plains Advanced Wastewater Treatment Plant
