= Cvek =

Cvek (pronounced [t͡sʋêk]) is a Croatian and Slovenian occupational surname for a shoemaker (Serbo-Croatian: cvek from German: Zwecke with the meaning "nail", "tack", "thumbtack", "shoe tack") and may refer to:

- George Joseph Cvek (1918–1942), American murderer and serial rapist
- Lovro Cvek (born 1995), Croatian footballer
- Matija Cvek (born 1993), Croatian singer-songwriter
- Rudolf Cvek (1946–2005), Croatian footballer
