= Krepper =

Krepper is a surname. Notable people with the surname include:

- Carl Krepper, German-American pastor and Nazi collaborator
- Magnus Krepper, Swedish actor, dancer, singer, and magician
