= Ex parte Quirin =

- Supreme Court of the United States

Argued July 29–30, 1942 Decided July 31, 1942
- Full case name: Ex parte Richard Quirin; Ex parte Herbert Hans Haupt; Ex parte Edward John Kerling; Ex parte Ernest Peter Burger; Ex parte Heinrich Harm Heinck; Ex parte Werner Thiel; Ex parte Hermann Otto Neubauer; United States ex rel. Quirin v. Cox, Brig. Gen., U.S.A., Provost Marshal of the Military District of Washington, and 6 other cases.
- Citations: 317 U.S. 1 (more) 63 S. Ct. 2; 87 L. Ed. 3; 1942 U.S. LEXIS 1119

Case history
- Prior: Motion for leave to file petition for writs of habeas corpus denied, 47 F. Supp. 431 (D.D.C. 1942)

Holding
- Jurisdiction of a United States military tribunal over the trial of several German saboteurs in the United States was constitutional.

Court membership
- Chief Justice Harlan F. Stone Associate Justices Owen Roberts · Hugo Black; Stanley F. Reed · Felix Frankfurter; William O. Douglas · Frank Murphy; James F. Byrnes · Robert H. Jackson

Case opinion
- Per curiam
- Majority: Stone
- Murphy took no part in the consideration or decision of the case.

Laws applied
- U.S. Const.

Ex parte Quirin, 317 U.S. 1 (1942), was a case of the United States Supreme Court that during World War II upheld the jurisdiction of a United States military tribunal over the trial of eight German saboteurs, in the United States. Quirin has been cited as a precedent for the trial by military commission of unlawful combatants.

It was argued July 29 and 30, and decided July 31, with an extended opinion filed October 29, 1942.

== Background ==
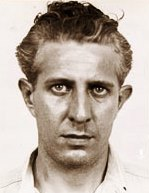
Richard Quirin

The eight men involved in the case were Ernest Peter Burger, George John Dasch, Herbert Hans Haupt, Heinrich Heinck, Edward Kerling, Herman Neubauer, Richard Quirin and Werner Thiel. Burger and Haupt were U.S. citizens. (317 U.S. 1)

All were born in Germany and all had lived in the United States. All returned to Germany between 1933 and 1941. After the declaration of war between the United States and Nazi Germany in December 1941 following the Japanese sneak attack on Pearl Harbor, they received training at a sabotage school near Berlin, where they were instructed in the use of explosives and in methods of secret writing.

Burger, Dasch, Heinck and Quirin traveled from occupied France by U-202 to Amagansett Beach, Long Island, New York, landing in the hours of darkness, on June 13, 1942. The remaining four boarded the German submarine U-584 which carried them from France to Ponte Vedra Beach, Florida. On June 16, 1942, they came ashore during the hours of darkness. All eight wore full or partial German military uniforms so that if they were captured upon landing, they would be entitled to prisoner-of-war status rather than being treated as spies. The Long Island group was noticed by Coast Guard beach patrolman John C. Cullen, whom the saboteurs attempted to bribe with $260. Cullen returned to his station and sounded the alarm. The two groups promptly disposed of uniforms and proceeded in civilian dress to New York City and Jacksonville, Florida, respectively, and from there to other points in the United States. All had received instructions in Germany from an officer of the German High Command to destroy war industries and other key targets in the United States, for which they or their relatives in Germany were to receive salary payments from the German government.

Upon landing, Dasch and Burger turned themselves in to the Federal Bureau of Investigation with some difficulty, since the FBI did not believe them immediately. They convinced the FBI that they were telling the truth and the remaining six were taken into custody in New York and Chicago, Illinois by FBI agents. The FBI had no leads until Dasch gave his exaggerated and romanticized version in Washington, D.C.

=== Military tribunal ===
On July 2, 1942, President Franklin D. Roosevelt issued Executive Proclamation 2561 establishing a military tribunal to prosecute the Germans. Placed before a seven-member military commission, the Germans were charged with:

1. violating the law of war;
2. violating Article 81 of the Articles of War, defining the offense of corresponding with or giving intelligence to the enemy;
3. violating Article 82 of the Articles of War, defining the offense of spying;
4. conspiracy to commit the offenses alleged in the first three charges.

From July 8 to August 1, 1942, the trial took place in Assembly Hall #1 on the fifth floor of the Department of Justice building in Washington, D.C. On August 3, 1942, two days after the trial ended, all eight were found guilty and sentenced to death. Roosevelt later commuted the death sentence of Dasch to 30 years in prison and the sentence of Burger to life in prison, as they had both confessed and assisted in capturing the others. Indeed, it was Dasch who approached the FBI, offering to turn the men in, which he then did. Burger was part of the plot to turn on the others and cooperated with the FBI extensively. The remaining six were executed in the electric chair on the third floor of the District of Columbia jail on August 8 and buried in a potter's field called Blue Plains in the Anacostia area of Washington.

In 1948, Dasch and Burger were released by President Harry S. Truman and deported to the American Zone of occupied Germany. Dasch spent the remaining years of his life trying to return to the United States. One time, a visa application was sent to J. Edgar Hoover by the State Department on Dasch's behalf. Hoover stated that the idea of giving Dasch a visa was "outrageous" and promptly denied it. Dasch died – still in Germany – in 1992.

=== Constitutionality of military tribunals ===
Throughout the trial, Roosevelt's decision of creating a military tribunal to prosecute the Germans was challenged by Lieutenant Colonel Kenneth Royall, who was appointed to defend the Germans. Royall said that Roosevelt had no right to create a military tribunal to try his clients, citing Ex parte Milligan (1866), a case in which the U.S. Supreme Court ruled that the federal government could not establish military tribunals to try civilians in areas where civilian courts were functioning, even during wartime. Since civilian courts were functioning in Washington, D.C., he argued that the case involving the Germans should be heard there. Attorney General Francis Biddle, who was appointed as a prosecutor of the case, responded that the clients who, acting on behalf of the German government, secretly entered into U.S. territory without proper uniforms in time of war for the purpose of committing hostile acts, were not entitled to have access to civilian courts. Biddle stated that, "This is not a trial of offenses of law of the civil courts, but is a trial of the offenses of the law of war, which is not recognizable by the civil courts. It is the trial, as alleged in the charges, of certain enemies who crossed our borders ... and who crossed in disguise and landed here ... They are exactly and precisely in the same position as armed forces invading this country."

Royall asserted that there was no evidence to prove that the Germans would have followed through with their plans, claiming they had only vague contacts through which to communicate with Germany, and no plans to return home until after the war. Biddle rebutted this argument, citing the case of British Major John André, who was executed as a spy by the Continental Army for passing through American lines to meet with American officer Benedict Arnold during the American Revolutionary War. Royall, along with his clients, then petitioned for a writ of habeas corpus demanding that the Germans were entitled to trial by jury guaranteed by the U.S. Fifth and Sixth Amendments. Though the U.S. Supreme Court had been adjourned for the summer, it convened to consider the matter in a special session on July 29, 1942. Justice Frank Murphy, an Army officer at the time, recused himself.

Royall argued that the German landings at New York and Florida could not be characterized as "zones of military operation" and contended that there was no combat there or plausible threat of invasion by approaching enemy forces. He argued that civilian courts were functioning, and under the circumstances, they were the appropriate venue for the case to be heard. Biddle responded that the U.S. and Germany were at war and cited the Alien Enemies Act of 1798 which stated:

That whenever there is a declared war between the United States and any foreign nation or government, or any invasion or predatory incursion is perpetrated, attempted, or threatened against the territory of the United States by any foreign nation government, and the President makes public proclamation of the event, all natives, citizens, denizens, or subjects of the hostile nation or government, being of the age of fourteen years and upward, who shall be within the United States and not actually naturalized, shall be liable to be apprehended, restrained, secured, and removed as alien enemies.

On July 31, the Supreme Court unanimously denied Royall's appeal, writing, "The military commission was lawfully constituted ... petitioners are held in lawful custody for trial before the military commission and have not shown cause for being discharged by writ of habeas corpus."

== Supreme Court decision ==
The Supreme Court had issued its decision on July 31, 1942, but did not release a full opinion until October 29, 1942. In this decision, the Court held:

(1) That the charges preferred against petitioners on which they are being tried by military commission appointed by the order of the President of July 2, 1942, allege an offense or offenses which the President is authorized to order tried before a military commission. (2) That the military commission was lawfully constituted. (3) That petitioners are held in lawful custody, for trial before the military commission, and have not shown cause for being discharged by writ of habeas corpus. The motions for leave to file petitions for writs of habeas corpus are denied.

The Court ruled that the German saboteurs had no right to be given access to civilian courts because they were "plainly within the ultimate boundaries of the jurisdiction of military tribunals, and were held in good faith for trial by military commission, charged with being enemies who, with the purpose of destroying war materials and utilities, entered or after entry remained in our territory without uniform – an offense against the law of war. Those particular acts constitute an offense against the law of war which the Constitution authorizes to be tried by military commission." It held that while lawful combatants may be captured and held as prisoners of war, unlawful combatants face harsher circumstances such as being sentenced to prison terms or put to death.

The Court also drew a distinction between the cases of Milligan and Quirin. In the Milligan case, Lambdin P. Milligan, although conspiring to commit sabotage in aid of the Confederate cause, was a civilian resident of Indiana, one of the many Union states engaged in a Civil War against the Confederacy, had not had a residence in a Confederate state, was not a part of or associated with the Confederate armed forces, and thus could not be tried by a military tribunal in areas where civilian courts were operating. On the other hand, in the Quirin case, the Germans were part of or associated with the German armed forces, entered into U.S. territory without proper uniforms in time of war for the purpose of gathering intelligence or waging war by destruction of life or property, and thus were liable to be tried by a military tribunal.

This decision states in part that:

... the law of war draws a distinction between the armed forces and the peaceful populations of belligerent nations and also between those who are lawful and unlawful combatants. Lawful combatants are subject to capture and detention as prisoners of war by opposing military forces. Unlawful combatants are likewise subject to capture and detention, but in addition they are subject to trial and punishment by military tribunals for acts which render their belligerency unlawful. The spy who secretly and without uniform passes the military lines of a belligerent in time of war, seeking to gather military information and communicate it to the enemy, or an enemy combatant who without uniform comes secretly through the lines for the purpose of waging war by destruction of life or property, are familiar examples of belligerents who are generally deemed not to be entitled to the status of prisoners of war, but to be offenders against the law of war subject to trial and punishment by military tribunals.

Haupt and Burger argued that as U.S. citizens, they should not have their writs of habeas corpus suspended, but the Court ruled that "[c]itizenship in the United States of an enemy belligerent does not relieve him from the consequences of a belligerency which is unlawful because in violation of the law of war." It also stated that "citizens who associate themselves with the military arm of an enemy government, and with its aid, guidance, and direction enter this country bent on hostile acts are enemy belligerents within the meaning of the Hague Convention and the law of war." Furthermore, the Court ruled that the president's proclamation was a lawful order because it was in fact recognized by Congress in Articles 15, 38, and 46 of the Articles of War. In explaining the role of Congress, Chief Justice Harlan Stone held that:

Congress, in addition to making rules for the government of our Armed Forces, by the Articles of War has exercised its authority under Art. I, § 8, cl. 10 of the Constitution to define and punish offenses against the law of nations, of which the law of war is a part, by sanctioning, within constitutional limitations, the jurisdiction of military commissions to try persons for offenses which, according to the rules and precepts of the law of nations, and more particularly the law of war, are cognizable by such tribunals. And by Article of War 15, Congress has incorporated by reference, as within the jurisdiction of military commissions, all offenses which are defined as such by the law of war and which may constitutionally be included within that jurisdiction.

=== Decision controversy ===
Although the court issued a unanimous opinion in Quirin, the road to the final decision was marked by disagreement. Justice Douglas wrote that it was unfortunate that the court agreed to take the case. He stated that "while it was easy to agree on the original per curiam, we almost fell apart when it came to write the views." Chief Justice Stone, for his part, was very concerned with the court's reputation, specifically because he did not want the court to be perceived as just standing by while six men were executed. He pushed for a unanimous opinion. Despite Stone's views, Justice Robert H. Jackson wrote a concurring draft opinion, expressing his disagreement with portions of the Court's opinion. Over time, his concurring draft got longer and longer and evolved into a typewritten memorandum. This memorandum was written two years before his dissent in Korematsu v. United States and a decade before his famous concurrence in Youngstown Sheet & Tube Co. v. Sawyer. It provides insight into Jackson's views on the scope of the President's constitutional war powers. The controversy has been revived, and has had legal implications during the war on terror of the first decade of the 21st century.

=== Justice Jackson's draft opinion ===
In his draft opinion, Jackson attributed sweeping powers to the President. He concluded that (1) the President has the inherent authority to create military tribunals, (2) this authority could not be regulated by Congress, and (3) this power was by virtue of his power as Commander-in-Chief.

Jackson stated, "I think the Court's decision of the question whether it complied with the Articles of War is uncalled for. The history and the language of the Articles are to me a plain demonstration that they are clearly inapplicable to this case and it is abundantly clear to me that it is well within the war powers of the President to create a non-statutory military tribunal of the sort here in question." He further wrote "The right to convene such an advisory committee of his staff as a 'military commission' for the discharge of his duties toward prisoners of war is one that follows from his position as commander in chief." Nonetheless, Jackson maintained that the President's power should be "discharged, of course, in the light of any obligation undertaken by our country under treaties or conventions or under customs and usages so generally accepted as to constitute the laws of warfare."

More importantly, Jackson also questioned the Court's ability to review the President's actions. He concluded that dealing with enemy prisoners of war was a foreign policy issue that touched upon issues of national security and political questions that were wholly out of the province of the judiciary. Jackson also stated that granting enemy combatants individual rights against military authorities would not be reciprocated in other countries.

Jackson analyzed both the history and purposes of the Articles of War to conclude that the Articles are not applicable to enemy combatants – rather, they were meant to protect U.S. civilians in times of military government. Although it would seem that his draft opinion is at odds with his later views of the President's war powers, specifically in Youngstown Sheet & Tube Co. v. Sawyer in which he interpreted Congress's ability to restrict the President's powers rather generously, there are substantive differences between the two cases. Youngstown concerned an exercise of presidential power in a domestic matter against civilians in an undeclared war. It was very different from the scenario present in Quirin, in which the President seized enemy combatants and did not address the internal functioning of the government.

In Quirin, Jackson ultimately believed it was a mistake for the Court to review military judgments in times of war and he solidified this position in his dissent in Korematsu v. United States. In that case, he stated "in the very nature of things military decisions are not susceptible of intelligent judicial appraisal." His dissent in Korematsu expresses his belief that bringing those affected by military orders under the protection of the constitution would be a dangerous precedent and that the court should neither execute nor review such orders. He was afraid that the "emergency that justified the classification (in Korematsu) would eventually be forgotten, leaving the constitutionality of the classification as the lesson of the case." Jackson believed the court would never be able to perform its duty if it joined the executive in making constitutional shortcuts.

In the end, Justice Jackson withdrew his concurring opinion, perhaps in response to Chief Justice Stone, or perhaps in response to Justice Felix Frankfurter's Soliloquy. The Soliloquy was an unusual memo addressed to the saboteurs in which Frankfurter urged the court to issue a single opinion. Regardless of why he chose to withdraw the opinion, his memorandum offers insight into an issue which divided the Court and remains divisive today.

== Quirin and the Guantanamo Bay military commissions ==
=== Guantanamo Bay cases ===
The week prior to the November 13, 2001 Military Order to try suspected terrorists detained at Guantanamo Bay before military commissions, the Office of Legal Counsel relied on Ex parte Quirin as a legal basis for the President's authority to issue the order. Upon the capture of the Quirin saboteurs, President Roosevelt had issued an executive order, upon which the order issued by President Bush was putatively modeled; this authorized military commissions to try the captives for, among other offenses, violations of the laws of war, providing the enemy with intelligence, and spying.

Quirin had held that extant legislation authorized the use of military commissions for the types of offenses in question. While in Quirin there had been a public law passed with the title "declaration of war" and three Articles (15, 81 and 82) of the Articles of War, President Bush's claim relied on the Authorization for Use of Military Force of 2001 and two provisions of the Uniform Code of Military Justice, the successor to the Articles of War.

The validity of Quirin as a basis for the use of military tribunals in the "war on terrorism" as permitted by the Geneva Conventions has been disputed. A report by the American Bar Association commenting on this case, states:

The Quirin case, however, does not stand for the proposition that detainees may be held incommunicado and denied access to counsel; the defendants in Quirin were able to seek review and they were represented by counsel. In Quirin, "The question for decision is whether the detention of petitioners for trial by Military Commission ... is in conformity with the laws and Constitution of the United States." Quirin, 317 U.S. at 18. Since the Supreme Court has decided that even enemy aliens not lawfully within the United States are entitled to review under the circumstances of Quirin, that right could hardly be denied to U.S. citizens and other persons lawfully present in the United States, especially when held without any charges at all.

Since the 1942 Quirin case, the U.S. signed and ratified the 1949 Geneva Conventions, which were thus considered to be a part of U.S. municipal law, in accordance with Article 6, paragraph 2, of the Constitution of the United States (the Supremacy Clause). On February 7, 2002, President Bush adopted the view that Common Article 3 of the Geneva Conventions did not protect al Qaeda prisoners because the United States-al Qaeda conflict was not "of an international character." The Supreme Court of the United States invalidated the Bush Administration view of Common Article 3, in Hamdan v. Rumsfeld, by ruling that Common Article Three of the Geneva Conventions applies to detainees in the "war on terror", and that the Guantanamo military commission process used to try these suspects was in violation of U.S. and international law. In response to Hamdan, Congress passed the Military Commissions Act of 2006, which President Bush signed into law on October 17, 2006. The Act's stated purpose was "To authorize trial by military commission for violations of the law of war, and for other purposes." Like the Military Commissions Act of 2006, its successor the Military Commissions Act of 2009 explicitly forbids the invocation of the Geneva Conventions "as a basis for a private right of action."

== See also ==
- Ex parte Milligan (1866)
- United States ex rel. Toth v. Quarles (1955)
- Hamdi v. Rumsfeld (2004)
- Hamdan v. Rumsfeld (2006)
- List of United States Supreme Court cases, volume 317
