= Eugene Thompson =

Eugene Thompson may refer to:

- Flash Thompson (Eugene Thompson), a character appearing in Marvel Comics
- T. Eugene Thompson, American attorney who hired a hit man to kill his wife
- Eugene H. Thompson, member of the New Jersey General Assembly
- Junior Thompson (Eugene Earl Thompson), American baseball pitcher
