= Kiss and Kill =

1961 homicide in Texas, United States

"Kiss and Kill" refers to the March 20, 1961 homicide of Betty Williams (August 11, 1943 – March 20, 1961), a teenager from Odessa, Texas, United States. She was killed by her ex-boyfriend John Mack Herring (September 23, 1943 – January 5, 2019) at her own request in Winkler County, Texas. Herring was tried and acquitted for the killing after his lawyers argued that he had temporary insanity.

The case ran in newspapers throughout the United States.

== Background ==
Williams and Herring were both students at Odessa High School. Williams, who had counter-cultural views, was not considered popular, while Herring, an American football player, was considered to be popular. Williams engaged in sexual activity with boys she was not in a relationship with, something seen as taboo at the school. The two became lovers, but Herring later broke up with her. Williams asked multiple individuals to kill her, requests they took as jokes.

== Homicide and trial ==
Herring killed Williams on March 20, 1961. Herring and Williams went next to a pond on his parents' hunting property in Winkler County, 26 miles (42 km) from Downtown Odessa. He shot her in the head with a twelve-gauge shotgun, destroying much of it, attached weights to the body, and threw it into the pond. Herring stated that Williams chose the weapon he used to kill her. On March 22, 1961, she was reported missing, and Herring took police to the body after he was interrogated.

Herring was tried for murder but was acquitted. His lawyers argued he had temporary insanity. He was tried twice, once in Kermit, Texas, in a hearing that was only meant to determine whether Herring was sane at the time. After a legal challenge the Texas Supreme Court stated that the judge lacked the authority to do so. A second trial was held in Beaumont, Texas, resulting in an acquittal.

== Aftermath ==
Odessa High School staff did not provide counseling after the homicide occurred. Herring did not lose social status from the event, and instead town gossip maligned Williams, accusing her of leading him astray.

Shelton Williams, a cousin of the homicide victim and an alumnus of Permian High School who played against Herring in American football games, wrote the book Washed in the Blood, published in 2006. The television program A Crime to Remember covered the case in its finale episode of its third season. Shelton Williams assisted the making of the program.

Odessa High students reported ghost sightings and paranormal phenomena at the school for decades, up to 2006, centering around Betty Williams. Odessa High's administration applied paint to the school auditorium's windows to counter the ghost story culture. In 2019 CBS 7 Odessa stated "Many believe her ghost still haunts the halls of Odessa High School to this day."

Herring attended Texas Tech University and worked various blue collar jobs. He married twice, and both ended in divorce. Pamela Coloff of Texas Monthly stated that he appeared "utterly unremarkable", at odds with his appearance in his youth. Herring died on Saturday January 5, 2019, at the age of 75.
