= A Crime to Remember =

American documentary TV series (2013–2018)

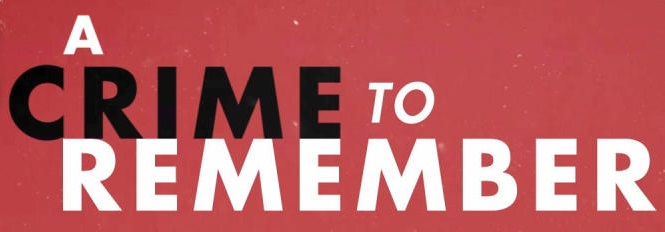
- Genre: Documentary
- Created by: Christine Connor
- Country of origin: United States
- No. of seasons: 5
- No. of episodes: 38

Production
- Executive producers: Christine Connor (Season 1-present); Lee Beckett (Season 1-present); Christopher K. Dillon (Seasons 3-4); John Block (Season 5)
- Running time: 43 minutes
- Production company: XCON Productions

Original release
- Network: Investigation Discovery
- Release: November 12, 2013 – April 7, 2018

A Crime to Remember is an American documentary television series that airs on Investigation Discovery and premiered on November 12, 2013. It tells the stories of notorious crimes that captivated attention of the media and the public when they occurred, such as the United Airlines Flight 629 bombing from 1955. As of the 2018 season, the series has aired 38 episodes over five seasons.

The series was officially renewed for Season 5 as of March 29, 2017, and the season began airing February 10, 2018.

== Contributors ==
Episodes feature interviews with surviving friends and relatives, as well as surviving investigators, journalists who covered the cases, and true crime experts and authors.

Prior to her 2016 death, author and True Crime Diary blogger Michelle McNamara, was a frequent contributor to the series,

Her role was next filled by Karen Kilgariff from podcast My Favorite Murder. The producers honored McNamara at the start of Season 4's finale: "This season of A Crime to Remember is dedicated to our friend Michelle McNamara".

== Production ==
Each episode is treated as a mini movie, and is filmed and edited as a motion picture is.

== Awards and nominations ==
Seasons 1, 2 and 4 won News & Documentary Emmy Awards for Outstanding Lighting Direction & Scenic Design.

Season 3 was Emmy-nominated in the same category.

== Episodes ==
Episode dates are from TVGuide.com.

Season	Episodes	Originally released	
Season	Episodes	First released	Last released
1	6	November 12, 2013	December 17, 2013
2	8	November 11, 2014	December 30, 2014
3	8	November 10, 2015	December 29, 2015
4	8	December 6, 2016	January 31, 2017
5	8	February 10, 2018	April 7, 2018

=== Season 1 (2013) ===
No. overall	No. in season	Title	Original release date
1	1	"Go Ask Alice"	November 12, 2013
Alice Crimmins is accused of murdering her children in 1965 to maintain a swinging lifestyle, 40+ years before Casey Anthony.
2	2	"The Career Girls Murders"	November 19, 2013
A Newsweek clip desk editor and a schoolteacher were murdered in NYC on August 28, 1963, in what the press called the Career Girls Murders. The treatment and forced false confession of one of the suspects will be cited by the U.S. Supreme Court in its famous 1966 Miranda v. Arizona decision requiring that police must inform suspects of their Constitutional rights for legal representation and to avoid self-incrimination upon arrest.
3	3	"Judge, Jury, Executioner"	November 26, 2013
The June 1955 disappearance and murder of Florida judge Curtis Chillingworth and his wife stun the West Palm Beach community and call into question a fellow judge.
4	4	"Time Bomb"	December 3, 2013
The bombing of United Airlines Flight 629 from Denver to Seattle on November 1, 1955 shocks the nation, a case of a son getting revenge on his mother. It leads Congress to formally make bombing a plane a federal crime.
5	5	"A New Kind of Monster"	December 10, 2013
The Co-Ed Killer murders paralyze Michigan students and residents from 1967–1969.
6	6	"Who Killed Mr. Woodward?"	December 17, 2013
Banking heir/horse breeder Billy Woodward is accidentally shot by his wife, Ann in 1955.

=== Season 2 (2014) ===
No. overall	No. in season	Title	Original release date
7	1	"38 Witnesses"	November 11, 2014
The 1964 murder of Kitty Genovese shocks the nation when the media falsely reports that 37–38 witnesses failed to do anything to help, leading to study of the "bystander effect" and the establishment of quick-dial emergency numbers like 9-1-1.
8	2	"The Shot Doctor"	November 18, 2014
When white Florida doctor and state senator-elect C. Leroy Adams is murdered in 1952, racial divides and differences are brought to the fore. His alleged murderer, Ruby McCollum, is a Black woman who had a child by him.
9	3	"Candyland"	November 25, 2014
Candy Mossler and her nephew have an affair and are accused of killing her husband in 1964, a case that rocks the south from Houston to Key Biscayne.
10	4	"The 28th Floor"	December 2, 2014
University of Texas tower shooting: Charles Whitman terrorizes the Austin campus on August 1, 1966.
11	5	"The Pied Piper"	December 9, 2014
Charles Schmid earns the nickname "The Pied Piper of Tucson" for his ability to lure three young Tucson girls to their deaths in 1964–1965 and to enlist two of his friends to help carry them out.
12	6	"Accident on Banyan St."	December 16, 2014
Lucille Miller is accused of murdering her husband Cork in a car fire to collect insurance money in 1964, a real-life case of Double Indemnity.
13	7	"Cabin In The Woods"	December 23, 2014
Burton Abbott is accused of murdering a 14-year old girl in 1955 and burying her remains near his cabin.
14	8	"Baby Come Home"	December 30, 2014
Six year old Bobby Greenlease is kidnapped and quickly murdered in 1953, after which a ransom demand is sent to his car dealer father in Kansas City.

=== Season 3 (2015) ===
No. overall	No. in season	Title	Original release date
15	1	"Lock Up Your Daughters"	November 10, 2015
Lee Roy Martin, the "Gaffney Strangler", murders four young South Carolina women 1967–1968.
16	2	"Last Night Stand"	November 17, 2015
The murder of Roseann Quinn in 1973 sparks debate about appropriate behavior for single women and inspires the novel Looking for Mr. Goodbar.
17	3	"And Then There Was One"	November 24, 2015
Richard Speck murders eight Chicago nursing students on July 13, 1966.
18	4	"Such A Pretty Face"	December 1, 2015
The murder of model Veronica Gedeon on Easter weekend, 1937, stuns New York City.
19	5	"Comedy of Terrors"	December 8, 2015
Macon, GA is shocked when Chester Burge is accused of killing his wife in 1960.
20	6	"The Wrong Man"	December 15, 2015
Sam Sheppard's 1954 case of allegedly murdering his pregnant wife stunned the nation. The successful appeal and not guilty re-trial launched the national career of defense attorney F. Lee Bailey.
21	7	"Damsel on Death Row"	December 22, 2015
Nellie May Madison kills her abusive husband on March 24, 1934, and becomes the first woman sentenced to death in California. The abuse defense and public outcry help get the sentence reduced to life, and she was later released.
22	8	"Bye Bye Betty"	December 29, 2015
Odessa, TX is devastated by the 1961 "Kiss and Kill Murder" of high school senior Betty Williams, cousin of junior (and future professor) Shelton Williams.

=== Season 4 (2016–2017) ===
No. overall	No. in season	Title	Original release date
23	1	"Teenage Wasteland"	December 6, 2016
Charles Starkweather and his teenager girlfriend Caril Ann Fugate go on a murder spree in 1958.
24	2	"Luck Be A Lady"	December 13, 2016
Sharon Kinne earns a reputation as "La Pistolera" from Kansas City to Mexico City in the early 1960s before escaping from jail.
25	3	"Devil's Advocate"	December 20, 2016
Minnesota attorney Cotton Thompson is accused of hiring a hitman to brutally kill his wife, Carol, in 1963.
26	4	"Paradise Lost"	December 27, 2016
The 1932 Massie Trial, and the 1931 affair that caused it, stun Honolulu.
27	5	"The Gentleman Killer"	January 3, 2017
In 1941, George Joseph Cvek, known as "The Gentleman Killer" and "The Aspirin Bandit", becomes one of America's first notorious serial rapists. Unprecented cross-jurisdiction cooperation by all the involved police forces and help from the surviving victims finally bring him to justice.
28	6	"Guess Who?"	January 10, 2017
Dolly Oesterreich brings her "Attic Lover" with her when she and husband Fred expand their garment business from Wisconsin to Los Angeles; he kills Fred in 1922 after Fred assaults Dolly. The full details remain hidden for eight years.
29	7	"Killer Prophet"	January 24, 2017
John Linley Frazier's 1970 Santa Cruz murder spree draws comparisons to Charles Manson's from the previous year.
30	8	"The Newlydeads"	January 31, 2017
Cheryl Perveler's murder by her ex-LAPD cop husband stuns Burbank in 1968, and exposes another murder and attempted murder by him. The trial and conviction of Paul Perveler and his girlfriend launch the career of young LA prosecutor Vincent Bugliosi.

=== Season 5 (2018) ===
No. overall	No. in season	Title	Original release date
31	1	"Once Upon a Crime"	February 10, 2018
Holcomb, Kansas, is shocked by the November 1959 murders of Herbert Clutter and his family. The event prompts author Truman Capote to write about the crime and the trial of the alleged killers in the book In Cold Blood, whose success makes the non-fiction novel a viable literary genre.
32	2	"The Bad Old Days"	February 17, 2018
In 1945-46 Chicago, the media is pressuring law enforcement to name suspects and solve three murders attributed to "The Lipstick Killer".
33	3	"Hearts of Darkness"	February 24, 2018
College students Leopold and Loeb commit "the crime of the century" in 1924 Chicago.
34	4	"Coffin for Christmas"	March 3, 2018
Real estate heiress Barbara Jane Mackle is kidnapped and buried in a reinforced fiberglass box for ransom in December 1968.
35	5	"Beast With a Badge"	March 17, 2018
In the summer of 1956, LAPD detective Danny Galindo seeks to exonerate black former cop Todd Roark from rape allegations pinned on him by the LAPD's all-white brass, and to find the real predator, Willie Roscoe Fields.
36	6	"Black Sheep"	March 24, 2018
Jerry Mark allegedly murders his brother and his family in Cedar Falls, Iowa on November 1, 1975 over a will dispute. The media dubs the mass homicides as the "Cain and Abel murders". Mark continues to claim innocence, and his appeals center on DNA evidence excluding him as a suspect.
37	7	"A Woman's Place"	March 31, 2018
Denver is stunned by the October 1930 murder of 10 year-old Leona O'Loughlin and attempted poisoning of her detective father Leo, attributed to Leona's stepmother, Pearl.
38	8	"Mother's Little Helper"	April 7, 2018
The Franklin Bradshaw murder rocks Salt Lake City in July 1978.
