= The Ninth Man =

1976 spy novel set in WW2

- First edition
- Author: John Lee
- Language: English
- Genre: Secret history, Historical fiction
- Set in: World War II
- Publisher: Doubleday (1976); Dell Publishing(1977)
- Publication date: 1976
- Publication place: United States
- Media type: Print

The Ninth Man is a novel set in World War II, written by John Lee, inspired by real events, Operation Pastorius, and set in the United States.

In 1942, the Germans landed eight saboteurs by submarine, four in New York and four in Florida. Within two weeks all eight were caught. Lee's novel is the fictional story of a ninth agent, who evaded capture. Lee's first best-seller, The Ninth Man was published by Doubleday in 1976, by Dell in 1977, also in several magazines excerpts, eight foreign languages, a 25-part radio serial for South Africa, and has been optioned for films seven times, though it has not yet reached the screen.
