= Odessa High School (Texas) =

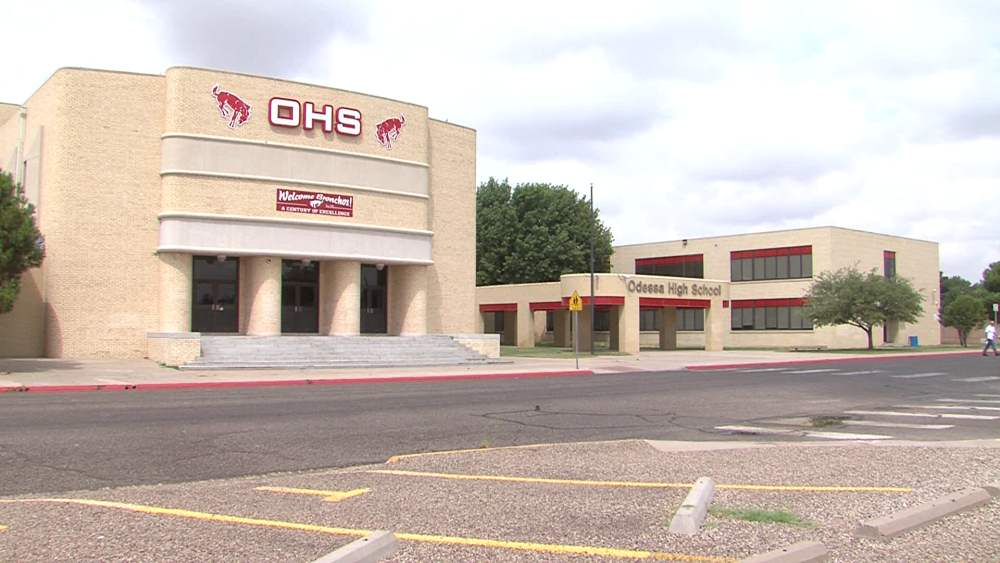

Location
- 1301 N Dotsy; Odessa, TX 79763-3576; United States; 31.8515°N 102.3824°W

Information
- Type: Public
- Established: 1909
- School district: Ector County Independent School District
- Principal: Hector Limon
- Staff: 221.18 (FTE)
- Grades: 9–12
- Student to teacher ratio: 17.04
- Colors: Red(Scarlet) and White
- Athletics conference: UIL Class 6A
- Mascot: Bronchos
- Website: Odessa High School

Odessa High School (OHS) is a public high school located in Odessa, Texas, United States. It is one of three high schools in the Ector County Independent School District. The full name of the school is Odessa Senior High School. This name was originally to differentiate it from Odessa Junior High School (now known as David Crockett Middle School). Normally, the school is commonly referred to as Odessa High or just OHS. In 2011, the school was rated "Academically Acceptable" by the Texas Education Agency. On April 17, 2014, Odessa High School was named an AVID National Demonstration School.

== Athletics ==
The Odessa Bronchos compete in the following sports:

Cross country, volleyball, football, basketball, powerlifting, swimming, soccer, gymnastics, golf, tennis, track, softball, gymnastics, and baseball.

=== State titles ===
- Baseball
  - 1950(All)
- Football
  - 1946(2A)
- Boys Track
  - 1950(2A), 1951(2A), 1952(2A), 1992(5A)

== Mascot ==
The mascot for Odessa High School is the Odessa Bronchos, with all female teams referred to as "Lady Bronchos." This unique spelling of "Broncho" has resulted in Odessa High being the only high school in Texas with this particular mascot. The original mascot for the team was the Yellowjackets and the team colors were purple and gold. In 1929, the student body voted 113–0 to change to the "Bronchos". The Bronchos colors were changed to scarlet and white.

== Band ==
The Odessa High School band was started in 1932 and has the longest consecutive streak of first division rating in marching contests in the State of Texas, going back 82 years. The band has also been invited to various music festival and contests across the nation. In March 2007, the band was invited to play their marching season selections "Letters from the Front" at the National World War II Memorial in Washington, D.C. In 2004, The Odessa High School Band combined with the band from Permian High School in Odessa to form one of the largest bands ever to march in the Tournament of Roses Parade in Pasadena, California (over 500 members).

== Culture ==
Odessa High School students reported ghost sightings and paranormal phenomena at the school for decades, up to 2006, centering around Betty Williams, who was killed during the "Kiss and Kill" homicide in 1961. Mack Herring, her killer, was ruled not guilty by grounds of temporary insanity by a Texas jury as she had asked Herring to kill her. Odessa High's administration applied paint to the school auditorium's windows to counter the ghost story culture. In 2019, KOSA-TV said, "Many believe her ghost still haunts the halls of Odessa High School to this day."

== Notable alumni ==
- Gene Babb, linebacker and fullback for San Francisco 49ers and Dallas Cowboys
- Marcus Cannon, offensive tackle for TCU and New England Patriots
- Hayden Fry, former head football coach, Southern Methodist University, University of North Texas, University of Iowa
- Larry Gatlin, Steve Gatlin, and Rudy Gatlin — Grammy Award-winning country artists
- Ronnie Goodwin, football player, Baylor University and Philadelphia Eagles 1963-68
- Bradley Marquez, Texas Tech football player and minor league baseball outfielder for the New York Mets, professional football player for Los Angeles Rams
- Nolan McCarty, class of 1986, Chair Department of Politics, Princeton University
- Derrick Shepard, wide receiver for University of Oklahoma and Dallas Cowboys
- Jack Ward, class of 1966, bareback riding champion with two World Championships (1977 and 1978); inducted into Texas Cowboy Hall of Fame on January 13, 2011, in Fort Worth
- Stephnie Weir, actress, Mad TV
- George E. "Buddy" West (1936–2008), Odessa's representative to Texas Legislature, 1993-2008
- Alfred M. Wilson, USMC, class of 1967— posthumous Medal of Honor, KIA in Vietnam
- Richard Wortham, college baseball star at University of Texas and former Major League Baseball pitcher
