= Lucille Miller =

American criminal

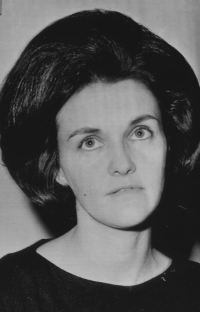
- Miller in 1965
- Born: Lucille Marie Maxwell; January 17, 1930; Winnipeg, Manitoba, Canada
- Died: November 4, 1986 (aged 56)
- Children: 4
- Status: Deceased
- Motive: Life insurance money
- Conviction: First-degree murder
- Penalty: Life imprisonment

Details
- Date: October 7, 1964
- Locations: Alta Loma area, San Bernardino County, California
- Killed: 1–2
- Weapon: Volkswagen Beetle fire

Lucille Marie Miller (née Maxwell; January 17, 1930 – November 4, 1986) was a Canadian-American housewife and mother who was convicted of first-degree murder in the death of her husband. Prosecutors alleged Miller was inspired by the eponymous plot device of the film Double Indemnity, a provision in which the proceeds of a life insurance policy pay double the face value for accidental deaths.

Joan Didion wrote a 1966 essay about the case, "Some Dreamers of the Golden Dream", which appeared originally in The Saturday Evening Post as "How Can I Tell Them There's Nothing Left" (a quote from Lucille Miller the morning of the fire); it was included in her 1968 book Slouching Towards Bethlehem.

== Background ==
At the time of the murder, Lucille Miller was just a few months shy of 35 years old, married to dentist Dr. Gordon "Cork" Miller, a mother of three, and pregnant with their fourth child. The Millers were Seventh-day Adventists (SDA), and had met and married when they attended the SDA-owned Walla Walla College. The family had recently moved from Oregon to a new house at 8488 Bella Vista Drive in the then-unincorporated Alta Loma area of San Bernardino County, California, due to Cork's stated desire to attend the medical college at the nearby SDA-owned Loma Linda University Medical Center so he could move from dentistry to general medicine.

Their oldest child, Debra J. Miller, recalled that her father wanted to be an airline pilot, but had reluctantly followed his own father into dentistry in order not to have college funding cut off. Cork had also showed signs of depression and suicidal behavior (including one incident where Lucille hid the keys to the couple's 1964 Volkswagen Beetle with Debra), and had been taking sedatives to help him sleep at night.

== Case history ==
On October 7, 1964, Lucille Miller had poured Cork a glass of milk to settle his stomach, and discovered she needed to make a late night trip to the store to purchase milk so the children would have it for breakfast. Cork asked to come along. He was sleeping next to the passenger door, which she locked to ensure he didn't fall out. They went to an all-night Mayfair Market where she purchased the milk. At about 12:30 a.m. on October 8 on the way home, Lucille claimed, the Beetle had a tire blow out, causing the car to catch fire as she drove off Banyan Street above a lemon grove. She claimed she tried to break a window but the fire was too hot to reach in and unlock the door, and that she then used a big tree branch to try to move her husband out of the car, but he was fast asleep. She then went to get help on the deserted section of Banyan Street and finally found a house from which she called the police.

The initial evidence matched her story, until authorities more closely examined the skid marks, which were much shorter than they would be in a loss of control as Lucille reported. They also noticed an empty can of gasoline lying on its side on the back seat, while the charred milk cartons were still standing upright and not jostled by the sudden stop. The car was still in low gear (unusual for a 35 mph crash), and was also dug in, implying that someone had tried to push it the rest of the way over the embankment.

Miller was arrested later that day and held pending charges. A complaint was filed on October 13, and an indictment for first-degree murder was returned October 20.

Further investigation led to the discovery of a $125,000 (some sources say $140,000) life insurance policy with a double indemnity clause for accidental death. The couple was also found to be roughly $64,000 in debt, including a nearly $30,000 mortgage on the Bella Vista house. Lucille was also discovered to have had an affair with lawyer Arthwell Hayton, a widower father of three, one of them a friend of Debra, who said Hayton's wife, Elaine, had died under mysterious circumstances. Both Lucille and Hayton told police that the affair had ended several months before Cork's death.

== Trial, conviction and appeal ==
Miller was convicted on March 5, 1965, and sentenced to life imprisonment. Her conviction was upheld on appeal to the California District Court of Appeal in 1966. In 1968, the U.S. Supreme Court (with F. Lee Bailey as part of her legal team) dismissed the writ of certiorari as improvidently granted.

After serving seven years of her sentence, she was paroled in 1972. Her attorneys, convinced of her absolute innocence, continued to appeal her conviction.

== Aftermath ==
In addition to the trial, Didion's essay contains details of the fire, the Hayton affair, and a biographical sketch of Lucille and Cork Miller. Didion would later meet Lucille Miller's daughter Debra in 1996.

Arthwell Hayton later married Wenche Berg, his children's governess. San Bernardino County authorities never further investigated the death of Elaine Hayton, which had been ruled an accidental overdose of sedatives, despite the discovery of the affair between Hayton and Lucille Miller and the fact that both their spouses had high levels of sedatives in their systems when they died.

Debra, Guy and Ron Miller all married, but had no children. Debra and Ron both became teachers (Ron is also a writer), and Guy became a third-generation Miller dentist. Kimi Kai Miller, born in June 1965 during their mother's incarceration at California Institution for Women in Corona, CA, died at age 25 from lung cancer.

Debra and Ron were two of the on-camera interviewees for "Accident on Banyan St.," an episode of A Crime to Remember that dealt with the case. It first aired on December 16, 2014, on Investigation Discovery.

== Death ==
Little has been revealed about Lucille Miller's post-parole life, except that the prison-educated stenographer and model prisoner had three job offers in Los Angeles upon her release from prison and that she planned to change her name.

Lucille was also "hopelessly entangled" with her children until she died of breast cancer on November 4, 1986, as Debra reported in a 2006 newspaper article she wrote about her mother's case.
