= Richard Quirin =

Spy for Nazi Germany (1908–1942)

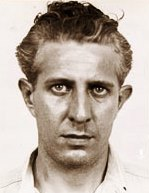
- Quirin's FBI mugshot (1942)
- Born: 26 April 1908; Berlin, Kingdom of Prussia, German Empire
- Died: 8 August 1942 (aged 34); D.C. Jail, Washington, D.C., United States
- Other name: Richard Quintas
- Occupation: Mechanic
- Political party: German American Bund; Nazi Party
- Status: Executed by electrocution
- Convictions: Acting as an unlawful combatant with the intent to commit sabotage, espionage, and other hostile acts Aiding the enemy as an unlawful combatant Espionage; Conspiracy
- Penalty: Death
- Espionage activity
- Allegiance: Nazi Germany
- Operations: Operation Pastorius

Richard Quirin (26 April 1908 – 8 August 1942) was a German agent executed as a spy for Nazi Germany in World War II. He was one of eight agents involved in Operation Pastorius, and gave his name to the Supreme Court decision on the trial, Ex parte Quirin.

== Early life ==
Born in Berlin in 1908, Quirin moved to the United States in 1927, living in Schenectady, New York. He worked as a mechanic during this time for General Electric. He lived in the U.S. from 1927 to 1939. During this time, Quirin joined the German American Bund and was an open supporter of the Hitler regime. He was a member of the Ordnungsdienst, the Bund's paramilitary wing. In 1939, Quirin and his wife returned to Germany. After his return, he got a job with Volkswagen. He worked with Heinrich Heinck at the plant in Braunschweig, and the two became the first recruited by Walter Kappe, the publisher of the Bund newspaper Deutscher Weckruf und Beobachter, for what became Operation Pastorius.

== Operation Pastorius ==
After the men were recruited, they were given pseudonyms and false stories to blend in as they returned to America. Quirin's new identity was Richard Quintas, a Portuguese man who moved to Upstate New York from Lisbon, Portugal when he was three. He was considered by Kappe to be a "cool, cruel man who would not hesitate to kill anyone to accomplish the mission's objectives." On 13 June 1942, Quirin was one of the first four to come to America as he, George John Dasch, Heinck, and Ernest Peter Burger came to American soil with a U-boat. Several days later, when Dasch turned himself in to the FBI, he named Quirin as one of the "true believers" of the operation. On 20 June, Quirin was the first to be arrested, FBI officers surrounding him as he tried to escape.

== Trial and execution ==
At the trial, Quirin took the stand after Heinck. He said he did not know the purpose of Operation Pastorius, and was just interested in returning to the United States. However, a cross-examination showed that Quirin saw himself as a loyal Nazi and had made no effort to get out of the operation. Quirin was emotionless as he was sentenced to death, only displaying sentiment when telling a guard that he wanted his contacts to know Dasch had "ratted" him out. Quirin and the five others were electrocuted on 8 August 1942, and buried in a potter's field with numbered graves.

Quirin wrote a final letter to his wife and daughter prior to his execution:

These are the last lines I can write to you. I should like to tell you that I have always loved you and that I came here to make a better life for you, my dear ones. But unfortunately, God willed it otherwise... Tell Kappe or one of his people that George Dasch and Peter Burger betrayed us. Begin a new life and think of me often.

== See also ==
- Capital punishment by the United States federal government
- List of people executed by the United States federal government
- List of people executed in the United States in 1942
