= T. Eugene Thompson =

American lawyer and criminal

Tilmer Eugene "Cotton" Thompson (August 7, 1927 – August 7, 2015) was an attorney from Saint Paul, Minnesota who hired a hit man to kill his wife. In December 1963 he was sentenced to life in prison. He was paroled in 1983 and died on his 88th birthday, August 7, 2015. Some Minnesotans suspected that the murder inspired the film Fargo, made by Minnesotans Joel and Ethan Coen in 1996, but Joel Coen denied this in an interview at the time of Thompson's death, saying the film's story was completely made up.

Season 4 Episode 3 of Investigation Discovery's series A Crime to Remember revisited the case in 2016.
