= Military tribunals in the United States =

Military courts for enemy combatants

Military tribunals in the United States are military courts designed to judicially try members of enemy forces during wartime, operating outside the scope of conventional criminal and civil proceedings. The judges are military officers and fulfill the role of jurors. Military tribunals are distinct from courts-martial.

A military tribunal is an inquisitorial system based on charges brought by military authorities, prosecuted by a military authority, judged by military officers, and sentenced by military officers against a member of an enemy army.

The United States has made use of military tribunals or commissions, rather than rely on a court-martial, within the military justice system, during times of declared war or rebellion.

Most recently, as discussed below, the administration of George W. Bush sought to use military tribunals to try "unlawful enemy combatants", mostly individuals captured abroad and held at a prison camp at a military base at Guantánamo Bay, Cuba.

== Jurisdiction ==
A military tribunal or commission is most usually used to refer to a court that asserts jurisdiction over persons who are members of an enemy army, are held in military custody, and are accused of a violation of the laws of war. In contrast, courts-martial generally take jurisdiction over only members of their own military. A military tribunal or commission may still use the rules and procedures of a court-martial, although that is not generally the case.

Military tribunals also, generally speaking, do not assert jurisdiction over people who are acknowledged to be civilians who are alleged to have broken civil or criminal laws. However, military tribunals are sometimes used to try individuals not affiliated with a particular state's military who are nonetheless accused of being combatants and acting in violation of the laws of war.

== History ==
General George Washington used military tribunals during the American Revolution, including the prosecution of British Major John André, who was sentenced to death for spying and executed by hanging. Commissions were also used by General (and later President) Andrew Jackson during the War of 1812 to try a British spy; commissions, labeled "Councils of War," were also used in the Mexican–American War.

The Union used military tribunals during and in the immediate aftermath of the American Civil War. Military tribunals were used to try Native Americans who fought the United States during those Indian Wars which occurred during the Civil War; the thirty-eight people who were executed after the Dakota War of 1862 were sentenced by a military tribunal. The so-called Lincoln conspirators were also tried by military commission in the spring and summer of 1865. The most prominent civilians tried in this way were Democratic politicians Clement L. Vallandigham, Lambdin P. Milligan, and Benjamin Gwinn Harris. All were convicted, and Harris was expelled from the Congress as a result. All of these tribunals were concluded prior to the Supreme Court's decision in Milligan.

The use of military tribunals in cases of civilians was often controversial, as tribunals represented a form of justice alien to the common law, which governs criminal justice in the United States, and provides for trial by jury, the presumption of innocence, forbids secret evidence, and provides for public proceedings. Critics of the Civil War military tribunals charged that they had become a political weapon, for which the accused had no legal recourse to the regularly constituted courts, and no recourse whatsoever except through an appeal to the President. The U.S. Supreme Court agreed, and unanimously ruled that military tribunals used to try civilians in any jurisdiction where the civil courts were functioning were unconstitutional, with its decision in Ex parte Milligan (1866).

Military commissions were also used in the Philippines in the aftermath of the Spanish–American War; as these were used in an active war zone as an expedient of war, they did not fall afoul of Milligan.

During World War II, President Franklin D. Roosevelt ordered a military tribunal for eight German prisoners accused of espionage and planning sabotage in the United States as part of Operation Pastorius. Roosevelt's decision was challenged, but upheld, in Ex parte Quirin (1942). All eight of the accused were convicted and sentenced to death. Six were executed by electric chair at the District of Columbia jail on August 8, 1942. Two who had given evidence against the others had their sentences reduced by Roosevelt to prison terms. In 1948, they were released by President Harry S. Truman and deported to the American occupation zone of Germany.

=== Hamdi v. Rumsfeld ===
Hamdi v. Rumsfeld, 542 U.S. 507 (2004), is a United States Supreme Court case in which the Court recognized the power of the U.S. government to detain enemy combatants, including U.S. citizens, but ruled that detainees who are U.S. citizens must have the rights of due process, and the ability to challenge their enemy combatant status before an impartial authority.

It reversed the dismissal by a lower court of a habeas corpus petition brought on behalf of Yaser Esam Hamdi, a U.S. citizen who was being detained indefinitely as an illegal enemy combatant after being captured in Afghanistan in 2001. Following the court's decision, on October 9, 2004, the U.S. government released Hamdi without charge and deported him to Saudi Arabia, where his family lived and he had grown up, on the condition that he renounce his U.S. citizenship and commit to travel prohibitions and other conditions.

Argued April 28, 2004

Decided June 28, 2004

== Trial by military commission of the Guantanamo detainees ==
The currently convened military commissions at the Guantanamo Bay detention camp are governed by the Military Commissions Act of 2009.

== See also ==
- Military justice
- Guantanamo military commissions
- List of resignations from the Guantanamo military commission
- Combatant Status Review Tribunal
- Administrative Review Board
