= John Lee (author) =

American writer (1931–2013)

John Lee (March 12, 1931 – 2013) was an American writer of thrillers, many of them set in Second World War settings, as well as non-fiction books. He was also a professor of journalism, distinguished by his conscious decision not to take up a doctorate despite having made all the preparations for it.

Lee was married to novelist Barbara Moore until her death in 2002 and regularly commuted between Memphis, Tennessee and Texas. Retired from teaching, he was later married to Shirley Miller Lee, a former South African, and lived on a ranch in Central Texas.

His best-known book is The Ninth Man, in which a daring Nazi spy penetrates the White House and nearly succeeds in assassinating President Franklin D. Roosevelt. He has also written six non-fiction books, including two popular university journalism texts (co-written with Edward Jay Friedlander).

== Early life ==
Born in Oklahoma on March 12, 1931, Lee was raised and educated in Brownsville, Texas. He attended college at Texas Tech, where he studied journalism under J. Russell Heitman, earning a B.A. While at Tech, he met and married fellow student Jeane Womack. They had a daughter, Janet Carol (Lee's only child), in 1952. Upon graduation, he went to work briefly as a sports writer for the Lubbock Avalanche-Journal, then was hired by the Fort Worth Star-Telegram, where he spent the next five years. His first marriage ended in 1956. In 1957, he married reporter Barbara Moore, who was also to become a novelist. The couple went to Europe for a year, living in Fuengirola, Spain, and returned to the United States in 1958 to work for the Denver Post for two years, then to corporate public relations for the Goodyear Tire & Rubber Company in Akron, Ohio. After two years at Goodyear, they went to Mexico to continue writing fiction.

In 1963, they returned to Texas, where Moore took a reporting job with the San Antonio Light and Lee remained at home, writing. A year later, Lee was offered a position as editor of the English-language Tehran Journal in Iran, but chose instead to return to school. He took a position at West Virginia University, where he taught courses in photography and earned a master's degree in journalism, with a minor in Broadcast Television. His master's thesis, a study of English-language newspapers around the world in non-English-speaking countries, was published and sold to newspaper and government people by the West Virginia journalism department.

== Teaching career ==
Lee's first teaching job was at American University in Washington, D.C. His students included Tom Shales, who later won a Pulitzer for his TV criticism, and Rona Cherry, who became Executive Editor of Glamour Magazine. During his two years at American University, Lee also became the assistant director of the Washington Journalism Center, working with Director Ray Hiebert to launch a new Kiplinger seminar program for American journalists. He also wrote his first successful novel, Caught in the Act, about an American journalist forced to run for his life in Spain, and edited a non-fiction book, Diplomatic Persuaders, a collection of essays on international information agencies. John also worked as a photographer for the Denver Post (years unknown) but prior to teaching at WVU. He taught Photojournalism at West Virginia University in 1964 and 1965 and possibly 1966.

In 1968, Lee was invited to teach at the University of Arizona, where he stayed for four years. During that time, he wrote his second novel, Assignation in Algeria, and penned a number of magazine articles so he could use them as case histories in his magazine-writing classes.

Lee left the University of Arizona in 1972 and started Ph.D. work in Journalism at the University of Missouri, with a minor in political science. After one semester, he accepted a position at New York University, where he taught journalism and a course in fiction writing. He continued his Ph.D. studies during the summers for the next couple of years, and took a brief leave of absence at NYU to act as a visiting professor at Missouri, and finished his third novel, The Ninth Man.

In 1975, NYU department chairman Mike Stein took a job in California at California State University in Long Beach, and invited Lee to join the staff there. Lee made the move in 1976. The Ninth Man was published that year by Doubleday and became a best seller. Lee soon signed a two-book contract for his next two novels. After getting straight A's in his Ph.D. course work and completing research for his dissertation (Edgar. A. poe as a Journalist), Lee decided his fiction-writing career was more important than the Ph.D. He turned over his Poe notes to his wife, who by now was teaching at California State at Northridge and had published her first novel, Hard on the Road, with Doubleday. She used the research to write her second novel, A Fever Called Living, about the last five years of Poe's life.

== Later life ==
Lee and his wife moved to Colorado in 1978, where Lee finished his fourth novel, Lago, and Moore finished her third, Something on the Wind. They moved back to Texas in 1982. Lee accepted a position at the University of Idaho, where he taught for two years, then joined the faculty at the University of Memphis (then known as Memphis State), where he stayed until his retirement in 1997, when he was named professor emeritus. He wrote one more novel during his time in Memphis, Stalag Texas, and numerous magazine articles. Moore wrote two more novels, The Doberman Wore Black, and The Wolf Whispered Death.

Moore died in San Marcos, Texas, in 2002, after a marriage of 45 years. A year later Lee met businesswoman Shirley Miller, a former South African. They were married in 2004.

John Lee died in 2013.

== Other works ==
Lee wrote articles for numerous magazines, from top markets to low, as well as six non-fiction books, including two major university textbooks co-authored with John Merrill and Edward Jay Friedlander, and a youth-oriented book called Monsters Among Us, co-authored with Barbara Moore. After his retirement from teaching, he took up full-time magazine writing, specializing in computers and game reviews for four different magazines and a twice-monthly publication called Games Business, for which he wrote a regular three-page feature called "On the Shelf."

== Partial bibliography ==
- The Ninth Man
- The Thirteenth Hour
- Lago
- Caught in the Act
- Assignation in Algeria
- Stalag Texas
- Olympia '36
- Old Spies Never Die
- Pryor's Ark
- The Stiff's Upper Lip
- Land of Eagles
- The Last Resort
- The Expatriate Press
- Diplomatic Persuaders
- Monsters Among Us
- Judging the Doberman Pinscher
- Modern Mass Media
- Feature Writing for Newspapers & Magazines
