= George Joseph Cvek =

American murderer and serial rapist (1917–1942)

George Cvek
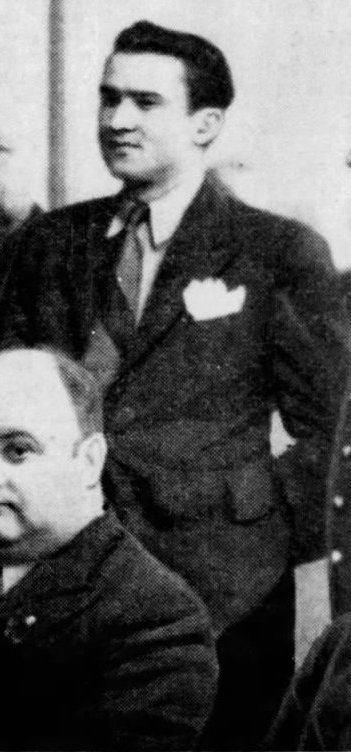
- George Cvek hearing the guilty verdict and mandatory death sentence against him, May 20, 1941
- Born: April 7, 1917; Harrisburg, Pennsylvania, U.S.
- Died: February 26, 1942 (aged 24); Sing Sing Prison, Ossining, New York, U.S.
- Cause of death: Execution by electrocution
- Conviction: First degree murder
- Penalty: Death

Details
- Victims: 1 (murder); 14–15 confessed, 81–156 suspected (rape, sexual assault, and robbery)

George Joseph Cvek (April 7, 1917 – February 26, 1942) was an American murderer and serial rapist. He was convicted of murdering 29-year-old (Note: The 1942 Associated Press report of Cvek's execution gives Pappas' age as 34. In 2008 the New York Daily News stated she was 29, as does the 2017 episode of A Crime to Remember.) Catherine "Kitty" Pappas, the wife of a coffee importer, in the Bronx, New York City, on February 4, 1941. After his arrest on the Pappas murder charge, Cvek admitted to the rapes of 14 other women in the New York City and Pennsylvania area; authorities suspected he may have robbed or sexually assaulted up to 156 women during his crime spree. He was executed for Pappas' murder in 1942.

== Early life ==
Cvek was born on April 7, 1917 in Harrisburg, Pennsylvania, as one of four children with one brother and two sisters. He was raised in nearby Steelton, Pennsylvania, descended from Yugoslav and Hungarian heritage. His mother also had Polish heritage. By his own admission, his upbringing was rough, as his family was abusive.

At the age of 12, Cvek committed his first theft; he had a history during his schooling years of being truant and stealing small items. Before he was 12 years old, his family relocated to Bressler, Pennsylvania. On March 29, 1929, when he was 12, his father George signed a petition in juvenile court labeling him as "incorrigible" due to his habit of stealing his parents' money. A juvenile court judge then placed Cvek into the custody of his respectable older brother Peter, but Cvek ran away from Peter's home days later and continued committing crimes. Peter's wife later said she was afraid of Cvek and "wouldn't let him in the house unless [her] husband was [home]".

In February 1930, still aged 12, he was charged with burglary and placed in a protectory in Phoenixville, Pennsylvania. After his father died in 1933, he was sent to the Pennsylvania Industrial School in February 1934 but released on September 4, 1935, just to be arrested days later for snatching a purse and sent back to Pennsylvania Industrial School. He spent the next four years in a cycle of recidivism with repeated confinements to reformatories for various burglaries, purse-snatching incidents, and car thefts, until June 1939, when he was sentenced to spend one year in the Dauphin County jail for the theft of a car; after his December 21, 1939, release, he moved to New York. His mother Barbara stated that his behavior frustrated her to the point where she "[didn't] much care what [happened] to him." After his arrest and confession in the murder of Catherine Pappas, his mother told the New York Daily News, "This is terrible, terrible. He's my boy and I don't want to see him die in the electric chair. But I don't feel too much sympathy for him. He's always been bad. To me, he's always been a headache. He always wanted to steal money and not to work for it. I guess he's no good."

== Murder, serial rapes and robberies ==
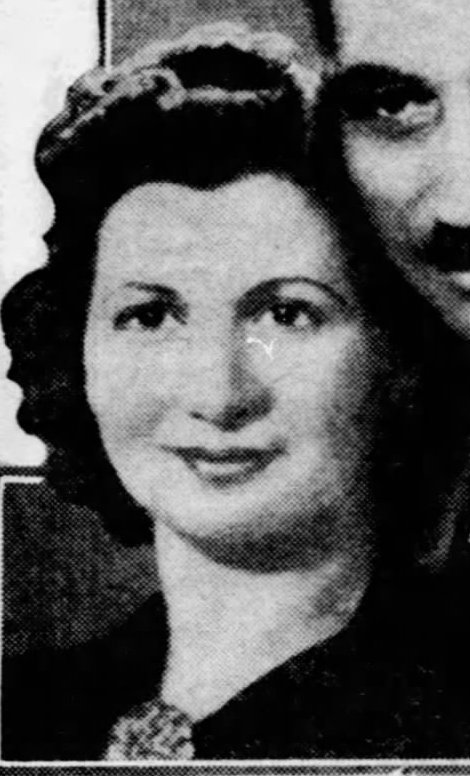
Catherine Pappas, Cvek's murder victim, c. 1940

According to Cvek's confession, Cvek entered Catherine Gouass Pappas' apartment on February 4, 1941, telling her he knew her husband. After she served him cookies and a drink, he grabbed her throat, tied her wrists and ankles with his own necktie and a dishtowel, tied another towel around her neck, forced her into a bedroom, and stole from her before fleeing the scene; when her husband returned home late that evening, she had died from strangulation. Pappas' autopsy showed that Cvek had not sexually assaulted her. In all, Cvek stole between $34 and $100 USD, Pappas' engagement ring which was worth $200, a diamond-encrusted crucifix, a cigarette case and lighter made of silver, and a large amount of dimes Pappas had stored in a bank, and he later pawned her valuables. Cvek recanted his confession before his trial.

Police connected Cvek to Pappas' murder through his fingerprints on a glass of wine Pappas let him use; comparing the fingerprints to a database of offenders from New York and Washington, D.C., they returned a match with Cvek's fingerprints due to his previous auto theft conviction in Pennsylvania. Pappas' husband also noted that the necktie around her wrists belonged to another man, and Cvek left behind four cigarette butts from a brand his wife did not smoke; a maid in the same building also witnessed Cvek fleeing the crime scene.

Bronx detectives, working with an unprecedented number of city, state and federal authorities from Maine to New Orleans, Louisiana, as well as the surviving victims of Cvek's crimes, traced at least 156 robberies and sexual assaults during a nine-month span from mid–1940 to February 1941 to Cvek. Authorities believed Cvek resorted to a modus operandi of using one of at least one dozen aliases and a false story to win the trust of motorists while hitchhiking. He would tell men he was a drifter from Boys Town, Nebraska, who was searching for work and would collect their addresses under the guise of relocating the men to pay them back for their help, while his actual motive was to break into their houses and bound, rob, or sexually assault their wives. He would gain entry to these women's homes by asking for a glass of water and aspirin, which earned him the moniker "The Aspirin Bandit" following the Pappas murder.

Authorities initially suspected Cvek in the murders of two Pennsylvania women, but he was cleared as a suspect when authorities learned he was confined to reformatories during the time of the women's murders. During this questioning, authorities brought between 15 and 20 women in front of Cvek, nine of whom identified him as an attacker who had robbed or sexually assaulted them. He was also questioned in the murder of Elizabeth Jensen, which, by the time of his execution, remained unsolved; on the eve of his execution, Cvek refused to further discuss Jensen's murder with authorities. Jensen was strangled to death in her Bronx apartment on March 3, 1941.

== Trial and execution ==
Cvek was tried by District Attorney Samuel J. Foley. Although Cvek recanted his confession, he testified during his trial on May 15, 1941 that he engaged in a "scuffle" with Pappas but did not know he had killed her until he read about her murder in newspapers. He refused to answer the majority of District Attorney Foley's questions, and after he finished giving his testimony, court was adjourned for the day.

The jury found Cvek guilty of murdering Pappas on May 19, 1941, and took under one hour of deliberation before sentencing him to death. At his sentencing, Cvek used profanity towards District Attorney Foley, to the point of inviting a verbal reprimand from the judge, and spat towards Detective Byrne, who had recorded Cvek's confession, while protesting his innocence of the charges and accusing authorities of manipulating him into making a false confession. Cvek also stated that he wanted the 15 women he confirmed he had robbed and assaulted to be in court to hear his sentencing.

He was executed on February 26, 1942, in the electric chair at Sing Sing Prison in Ossining, New York.

== See also ==
- Capital punishment in New York
- List of people executed in New York
- List of people executed in the United States in 1942

== In popular culture ==
Cvek was the subject of a 2017 episode of the Investigation Discovery series A Crime to Remember.
