= George John Dasch =

German spy (1903–1991)

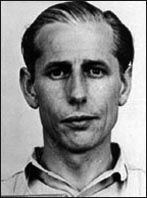
- Born: Georg Johann Dasch; 7 February 1903; Speyer, German Empire
- Died: 1 November 1991 (aged 88); Ludwigshafen, Germany
- Spouse: Charlotte Holliday Aldasch
- Children: 1
- Convictions: Acting as an unlawful combatant with the intent to commit sabotage, espionage, and other hostile acts Aiding the enemy as an unlawful combatant Espionage; Conspiracy
- Penalty: Death; commuted to 30 years imprisonment; later granted clemency with conditional deportation to American-occupied Germany
- Military career
- Allegiance: Germany; United States
- Branch: German Army; United States Army
- Service years: German Army 1917–1918; U.S. Army 1927–1928, 1936–1938
- Rank: German Army – Private; U.S. Army – Private
- Conflicts: World War I

George John Dasch (7 February 1903 – 1 November 1991) was a German agent who landed on American soil during World War II. He helped to destroy Nazi Germany's espionage program in the United States by defecting to the American cause, but was tried and convicted of espionage.

== Early life ==
George John Dasch was born as Georg Johann Dasch in Speyer in the German Empire. He entered a Catholic seminary at the age of 13 to study for the priesthood, but was expelled the next year for unknown reasons. Lying about his age, he enlisted in the Imperial German Army and served in Belgium during the final months of World War I.

In 1923, he entered the United States illegally through the Port of Philadelphia as a stowaway and then stayed in New York City. For four years, he drifted working at several restaurants, and spent one season at a hotel in Miami Beach, Florida. In 1927, he enlisted as a private in the U.S. Army Air Corps. He was assigned to the 5th Composite Group in Honolulu, and served with the 72nd Bombardment Squadron, but after a year he bought himself out and received an honorable discharge. He then worked as a waiter in San Francisco, Sacramento, Los Angeles, and back in New York City. In 1930, he married Rose Marie Guille, an American citizen.

Dasch re-enlisted in the U.S. Army in 1936 and was stationed at Fort Ontario in Oswego, New York. He served with the 1st Infantry Division, 28th Infantry Regiment, L Company, and married Charlotte Holliday in the parsonage of St. Paul's Lutheran Church in Oswego in March 1936. He used the alias George Henry Aldasch to hide his bigamy.

He and Charlotte lived at the home of her father, Jay Holliday, in Oswego while he served at Fort Ontario. They had a son, Howard Elliot Aldasch (October 29, 1937 – October 21, 2013). At some point in 1938, Dasch left the Army, abandoned his "wife" and their son, and returned to Germany. Charlotte Aldasch learned his real identity only in 1942, when he turned himself in to the FBI. She then sent their son to live anonymously with distant relatives in Madison, New York. Dasch's last communication with Charlotte and Howard was via a lawyer and military officer in 1955. At that time Dasch was trying to gain entry into the U.S. but it was denied by J. Edgar Hoover, head of the FBI.

== Operation Pastorius ==
=== Preparation for espionage ===
Dasch and the others were trained for espionage activities in a school run by the Oberkommando der Wehrmacht, the German High Command, on an estate at Quenz Lake, near Berlin. They received three weeks of intensive sabotage training, and were instructed in the manufacture and use of explosives, incendiary material and various forms of mechanical, chemical, and electrical delayed timing devices. Considerable time was spent developing the false background histories they were to use in the United States. They were encouraged to converse in English, and to read American newspapers and magazines.

=== Espionage activities ===
On 26 May 1942, Dasch and his team (Ernest Peter Burger, Heinrich Harm Heinck, and Richard Quirin) left by submarine from Lorient, France. They landed on Long Island, New York, shortly after midnight on 12 June. They were wearing German Navy uniforms to avoid being shot as spies if they were captured during the landing. Once they were ashore, they changed into civilian clothes, and buried their uniforms and other equipment.

Early that morning, John C. Cullen, a Coast Guardsman from the station in Amagansett, New York, spotted Dasch and the three others posing as fishermen on a raft off the coast of Long Island. He saw that they were armed and also noticed a submerged submarine. The men gave him $260 (some sources say $300) to keep quiet. Increasingly alarmed, he took the bribe but alerted his superiors. By the time an armed patrol could reach the site, the four Germans had taken the Long Island Rail Road train from the Amagansett station into Manhattan, where they checked in to a hotel. A search of the beach revealed concealed explosives, timers, blasting caps, incendiary devices, cigarettes, and the naval uniforms.

President Franklin D. Roosevelt and the FBI were immediately alerted, and the FBI conducted a massive manhunt. All information was kept secret to avoid public panic and to prevent the spies from knowing that they had been discovered. However, the FBI did not know exactly where the Germans were going.

== Defection to the United States ==
Dasch was unhappy with the Nazi regime. He eventually talked to one of his compatriots, a naturalized American citizen named Ernst Peter Burger, about defecting to the United States. Their plan was to surrender immediately to the FBI. Dasch ordered Burger to stay and keep an eye on the other German agents. On 15 June, Dasch called the FBI office in New York from a pay phone on the Upper West Side in New York City. The FBI agent did not believe his story, so Dasch hung up and took a train to Washington, D.C. four days later and checked in at the Mayflower Hotel. He then went to the FBI headquarters asking to speak to Hoover. Dasch tried to tell the truth to the FBI officials, but they did not believe his story. While Dasch was at FBI headquarters, the FBI sent agents to his hotel room, where they found in cash US$82,500 (equivalent to $1,625,636 in 2025).

Dasch was arrested and interrogated for eight days. He disclosed the locations of the other men in the sabotage operation, including Burger. Dasch revealed that the goals of the sabotage program had been to disrupt war industries and launch a wave of terror by planting explosives in railway stations, department stores, and public places. Armed with the information Dasch provided, the FBI arrested Burger and six other German agents within the next week. The FBI withheld the true circumstances of their arrest prior to the trial of the eight men, including the fact that they did not actually consummate their plans of sabotage.

== Aftermath ==
Dasch, Ernest Peter Burger, and six others–Edward John Kerling, Heinrich Harm Heinck, Richard Quirin, Werner Thiel, Hermann Otto Neubauer, and Herbert Hans Haupt (who had landed in Ponte Vedra Beach, Florida to meet with Dasch and Burger)–were tried by a military commission appointed by President Roosevelt on 8 July 1942. The military trial was ruled constitutional by the Supreme Court during the trial with the formal opinion written after the trial (see Ex parte Quirin). The eight were convicted of sabotage and sentenced to death. FBI Director Hoover and Attorney General Francis Biddle appealed to President Roosevelt, who commuted the sentence to life imprisonment for Burger and thirty years for Dasch, because of their cooperation. The others were executed in the electric chair in Washington D.C Jail on 8 August 1942.

In 1948, President Harry S. Truman had both Burger and Dasch released and deported to the American occupation zone in Germany. They were not welcomed back because they were regarded as traitors who had caused the death of their comrades. Although they had been promised pardons by Hoover in exchange for their cooperation, both men died without ever receiving them. Dasch wrote an account of his involvement with Operation Pastorius ("Eight Spies Against America," Publisher: R.M. McBride Co., 1959, Library of Congress catalog # 59-13612). He died in 1991 at the age of 88 in Ludwigshafen, Germany.

== See also ==
- Military history of the United States
- History of Germany during World War II
