= Ernest Peter Burger =

German-American saboteur in WWII (1906–1975)

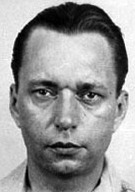
- FBI mugshot
- Born: September 1, 1906; Augsburg, German Empire
- Died: October 9, 1975 (aged 69); West Germany
- Known for: Agent in Operation Pastorius
- Political party: Nazi Party
- Status: Deceased
- Convictions: Acting as an unlawful combatant with the intent to commit sabotage, espionage, and other hostile acts Aiding the enemy as an unlawful combatant Espionage; Conspiracy
- Penalty: Death; commuted to life imprisonment; later granted clemency with conditional deportation to American-occupied Germany

Ernest Peter Burger (September 1, 1906 – October 9, 1975) was a German-American who was a saboteur for Germany during World War II who defected to the United States. A naturalized citizen of the United States who returned to Germany during the Great Depression, Burger was recruited along with seven others by the Abwehr for Operation Pastorius, which sought to sabotage targets in the United States in 1942.

However, after being deployed, he and fellow saboteur George John Dasch defected and betrayed the other six agents involved to the Federal Bureau of Investigation. After some litigation, a military tribunal sentenced all eight agents to death, but President Franklin D. Roosevelt commuted Burger's sentence to life in prison. In 1948, President Harry S. Truman granted Burger executive clemency conditional on his deportation to the American occupation zone in Germany, where he died in 1975.

== Biography ==
Born in Augsburg, Germany, Burger was a machinist by trade. Burger joined the Freikorps Oberland when he was 15, and became a member of the Nazi Party at the age of 17. In 1923, he participated in the Beer Hall Putsch. Burger emigrated from Germany to America in 1927 and became a U.S. citizen in 1933. He had lived in the United States for some years, even serving in the Michigan and Wisconsin Army National Guard.

During the Depression, Burger returned to Germany. He rejoined the Nazi Party and became an aide-de-camp to Ernst Roehm, the chief of the Nazi storm troopers. Later, he wrote a paper critical of the Gestapo—a move which got him seventeen months in a concentration camp. In 1941, Burger was released and conscripted into the Wehrmacht. He served at a POW camp in Berlin, where he guarded Yugoslav and British prisoners. Despite his history as a survivor of a Nazi internment camp and harassment of his wife by Nazi Party members, Burger was recruited by the Abwehr, Nazi Germany's intelligence organization. He took part in Operation Pastorius, a plan by which eight German saboteurs were to be transported by U-boat to the United States. Burger and the others came to shore with the intention of damaging United States economic targets.

=== Apprehension, trial, and deportation ===
George John Dasch, another German agent, called Burger into their upper-story hotel room and opened a window, saying they would talk, and if they disagreed, "only one of us will walk out that door—the other will fly out this window." Dasch told him he had no intention of going through with the mission, hated Nazism, and planned to report the plot to the FBI. Burger agreed to defect to the United States immediately.

Besides Burger, none of the other German agents knew they were betrayed. Over the next two weeks, Burger and the other six were arrested. FBI Director J. Edgar Hoover made no mention that Dasch had turned himself in, and claimed credit for the FBI for cracking the spy ring. The saboteurs were tried and convicted of espionage. All were sentenced to execution by electrocution; however, Burger's sentence was commuted by President Franklin D. Roosevelt to life in prison and Dasch's to thirty years because of their cooperation. The others were executed in Washington D.C Jail on 8 August 1942.

In 1948, President Harry S. Truman granted executive clemency to Dasch and Burger on the condition they be deported to the American occupation zone in Germany. They were not welcomed back in Germany, as they were regarded as traitors who had caused the death of their comrades. Although they had been promised pardons by J. Edgar Hoover in exchange for their cooperation, both men died without ever receiving them.
