= Blue Plains (Washington, D.C.) =

Neighborhood in Washington, DC, US

Coordinates: 38°48′56″N 77°1′29″W

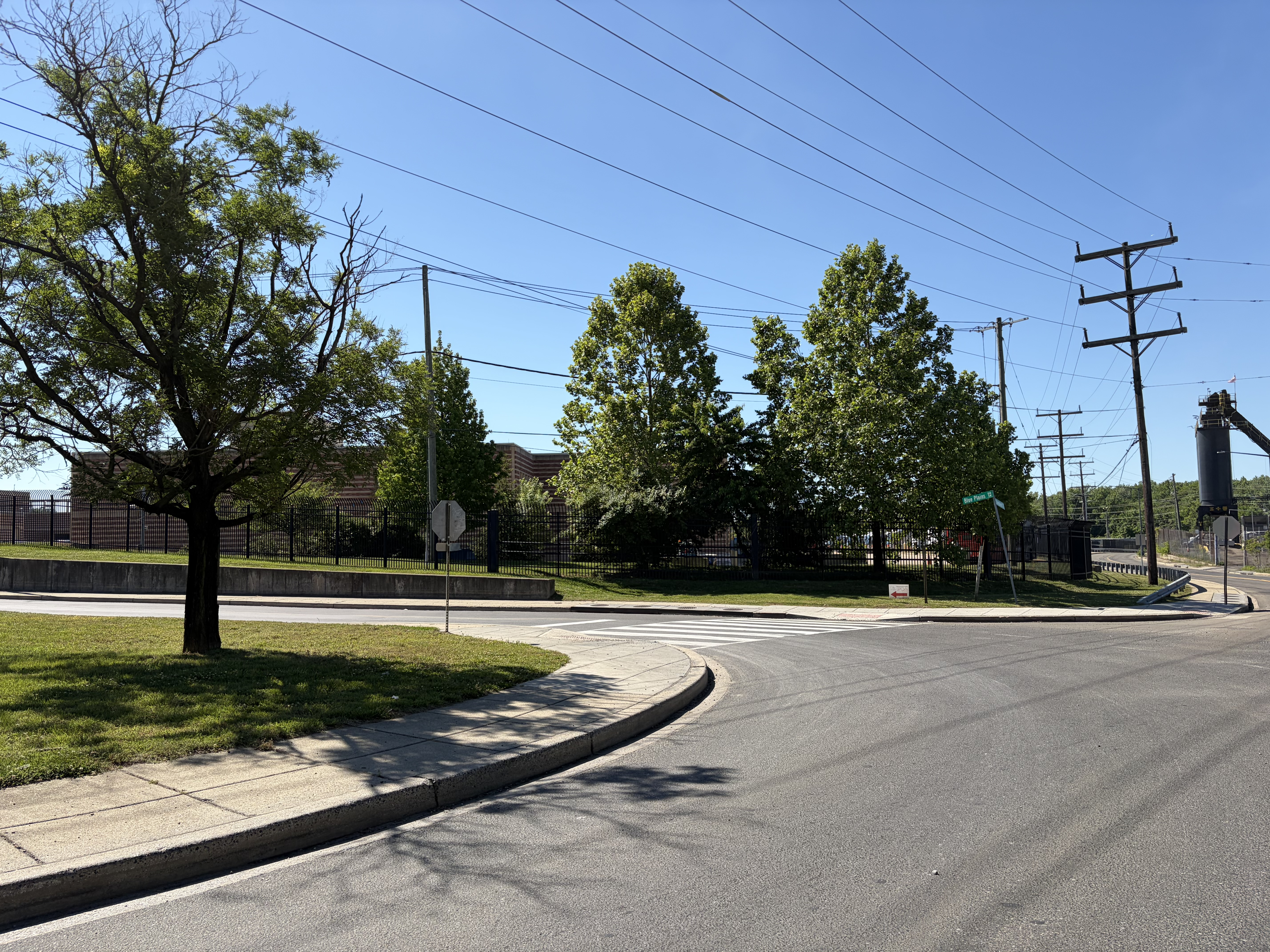
A street corner in Blue Plains

Blue Plains is a locale in the southwest quadrant of Washington, D.C. The area gives its name to the Blue Plains Advanced Wastewater Treatment Plant, the largest advanced wastewater treatment plant in the world. It also houses the U.S. Naval Research Laboratory, the D.C. Fire Department training school, a federal Job Corps training center, the U.S. Botanic Garden's production facility, and a WMATA Metrobus garage. The site also contains remains of executed international spies, including Nazi spies, from Operation Pastorius.
