= Joseph Edward Duncan =

American convicted serial killer and child molester (1963–2021)

- IDOC inmate mugshot, 2005
- Born: Joseph Edward Duncan III; February 25, 1963; Fort Bragg, North Carolina, U.S.
- Died: March 28, 2021 (aged 58); USP Terre Haute, Terre Haute, Indiana, U.S.
- Other names: Jet; Jazzi Jet
- Status: Died in prison
- Convictions: Federal; Kidnapping a child resulting in death Kidnapping a child Aggravated sexual abuse (2 counts); Sexual exploitation of a child resulting in death Being a felon in possession of a firearm Possession of a stolen firearm Using a firearm during a crime of violence resulting in death Transportation of a stolen vehicle Possession of an unregistered firearm Idaho; First degree murder (3 counts); First degree kidnapping (3 counts); California; First degree murder with special circumstances Kidnapping
- Penalty: Federal; Death; Idaho and California; Multiple life sentences without the possibility of parole

Details
- Victims: 5–8 killed 3–16 raped 1–7 molested 1 attempted molestation 1–3 stalked
- Span of crimes: 1978 – July 2, 2005 (confirmed)
- Country: United States
- States: Idaho, California (convicted); Washington (confessed)
- Date apprehended: July 2, 2005; 21 years ago
- Imprisoned at: United States Penitentiary, Terre Haute

Joseph Edward Duncan III (February 25, 1963 – March 28, 2021) was an American convicted serial killer and child molester who was on death row in federal prison following the 2005 kidnappings and murders of members of the Groene family of Coeur d'Alene, Idaho. He was also serving 11 consecutive sentences of life without parole for the 1997 murder of Anthony Martinez of Beaumont, California. Additionally, he confessed to—but had not been charged with—the 1996 murder of two girls, Sammiejo White and Carmen Cubias, in Seattle, Washington. At the time of the attack on the Groene family, Duncan was on the run from a child molestation charge in Minnesota.

During his incarceration, authorities connected Duncan with the unsolved murders of Anthony Martinez in California and two girls in Seattle, which all occurred when Duncan was on parole from 1994 to 1997. In all, he was convicted in Idaho for kidnapping and murdering the three victims in Coeur d'Alene, for which he was given six life sentences: in federal court for kidnapping Shasta and Dylan Groene and murdering Dylan, for which he was given three death sentences and three life sentences; and in the state of California for kidnapping and murdering Martinez, for which he was given two life sentences.

Duncan died on March 28, 2021, at the age of 58, as a result of a terminal brain tumor.

== Early life and criminal history ==
Joseph Edward Duncan III was born at Fort Bragg, in North Carolina, on February 25, 1963. He was the fourth of five children born to Joseph Edward Duncan Jr and Lillian Mae Duncan. He had three older sisters and a younger brother. His father was in the United States Army. Because of this, the family moved from city to city within the U.S. and abroad, changing locations every year or two until the elder Duncan retired to Tacoma, Washington when the younger was around 12 years old. His mother was described as a domineering woman. After being arrested in 1980, he claimed to have been abused as a child; however, his younger brother disputed this. His parents split up in 1979 and divorced in 1983. His sisters soon left the household all at once, and he remained behind with his mother while his brother went to live with their father after some time. His father would later remarry, giving Duncan a stepfamily. He attended Lakes High School but did not graduate.

Duncan had a long history as a violent sexual predator. He committed his first recorded sex crime in 1978 when he was 15 years old. In that incident, he raped a 9-year-old boy at gunpoint. The following year, he was arrested for driving a stolen car. He was sentenced as a juvenile and sent to the Jessie Dyslin Boys Ranch in Tacoma, where, according to a report by the Associated Press, he told a therapist assigned to his case that he had bound and sexually assaulted six boys. He also told the therapist that he estimated that he had raped 13 younger boys by the time he was aged 16.

In 1980, Duncan stole several guns from a neighbor and abducted a 14-year-old boy, raping him at gunpoint. He was sentenced to 20 years in prison for this crime but was released on parole in 1994 after serving 14 years. While out on parole, Duncan is known to have lived in several places in the Seattle area. He was arrested again in 1996—this time for marijuana use—and released on parole several weeks later with new restrictions. Authorities believe that he murdered Sammiejo White and Carmen Cubias in Seattle in 1996 and Anthony Martinez in Riverside County, California, in 1997, during his parole period; however, both those cases went cold and were not tied to him until after his arrest in the Groene case. He was arrested in Missouri and returned to prison in 1997 after violating the terms of his parole; he was released from prison on July 14, 2000, with time off for good behavior and moved to Fargo, North Dakota.

In March 2005, Duncan was charged with the July 3, 2004, molestation of two boys at a playground in Detroit Lakes, Minnesota. On April 5, 2005, he appeared before a Becker County judge, who set bail at US$15,000. A Fargo businessman, with whom he had become acquainted, helped him post bail. However, he skipped bail and disappeared. On June 1, a federal warrant was issued for his arrest for the "unlawful flight to avoid prosecution."

== Idaho murders and kidnappings ==
On May 16, 2005, authorities discovered the bodies of Brenda Groene, 40; her boyfriend, Mark McKenzie, 37; and her son, Slade Groene, 13, in their home along Lake Coeur d'Alene, outside the city of Coeur d'Alene, Idaho. Two of Brenda's other children–Dylan, 9, and Shasta, 8–were missing. An Amber alert was issued and searchers combed the area for the missing children while authorities investigated the deaths at the home as homicides. Autopsies determined the cause of death to be "blunt trauma to the head"; authorities also noted that the victims had been bound.

Forty-seven days later, in the early morning of July 2, 2005, Shasta was seen at a Denny's restaurant in Coeur d'Alene in the company of an unknown man. A waitress, a manager, and two customers there recognized the girl from media reports. They surreptitiously called the police and positioned themselves to prevent the man from leaving. Police officers arrived at the restaurant and arrested the man, later identified as Duncan, without incident. Shasta identified herself to the waitress at the restaurant and authorities, and was taken to Kootenai Medical Center for medical treatment and to be reunited with her father. Coeur d'Alene police, meanwhile, detained Duncan on kidnapping charges and on his outstanding federal warrant.

When Shasta was found without Dylan, authorities held little hope of finding the boy alive. Police asked the public for tips, specifically concerning sightings of the stolen red Jeep Cherokee with Missouri license plates that Duncan was driving at the time of his arrest. Authorities discovered that Duncan had rented the car in Minnesota and never returned it. A gas station employee in Kellogg, Idaho, about 40 miles (64 km) east of Coeur d'Alene, recognized the vehicle as one that had stopped at her station hours before Duncan was arrested. The employee suspected the girl wandering around the station might have been Shasta but did not confront her as nothing appeared out of the ordinary. The employee and her manager notified authorities after reviewing surveillance camera footage and identifying Duncan and Shasta in the video.

On July 4, 2005, investigators found human remains at a remote, makeshift campsite in the Lolo National Forest near St. Regis, Montana. The remains were sent for DNA testing to the FBI lab in Quantico, Virginia, where they were positively identified as Dylan's. During the trial, it emerged that Duncan shot him at point-blank range by holding a sawn-off 12-gauge shotgun to his head.

=== Groene family murders ===
Much of what is known about the murders of the Groene family was revealed by Shasta Groene herself. According to Shasta's police interview, Duncan killed her mother, older brother, and her mother's fiancé. Then, he kidnapped her and her brother, driving away with them in the stolen Jeep Cherokee.

Shasta told investigators her mother came into Dylan's and her room and woke them up. Her mother said, "Someone is in the house," and led them into the living room, where Shasta saw Duncan wearing black gloves and holding a gun. Duncan tied her mother's hands with nylon zip ties and did the same to her mother's fiancé and Shasta's brother Slade. Duncan removed Shasta and Dylan from the house and placed them outside on the lawn. While waiting outside with her brother, Shasta heard multiple thumping sounds during the time that Duncan bludgeoned the three people remaining inside the home to death. She then saw her injured older brother, Slade, staggering away from the entrance to the house. Once he had finished murdering the three inside, Duncan placed Shasta and Dylan in his car. He took both children to other locations, where he repeatedly raped and tortured them for six weeks. Shasta stated that they drove a long distance and stayed in two different campsites, during which time Duncan told her of having beaten her family members to death with a hammer.

Shasta also told investigators how Dylan was murdered, contesting Duncan's account that the boy's death had been an accident. Initially, Shasta was standing on the other side of Duncan's Jeep when she heard a loud boom. She then ran to the other side of the Jeep and saw Dylan lying on the ground, screaming. Duncan stated that he was digging through a clear plastic box looking for beer when a shotgun that was also kept in the box went off, hitting Dylan in the stomach. Shasta recounted that she then saw Duncan put the shotgun to Dylan's head and pull the trigger, but it failed to fire. While Dylan begged Duncan not to kill him, Duncan reloaded the gun, put it back to the boy's head and pulled the trigger; Dylan was killed instantly. According to Shasta, Duncan then started crying and told her that he only killed him to put him out of his misery. A public memorial service was held for Dylan on July 16, 2005, which would have been his tenth birthday, at Real Life Ministries.

Shasta reported that Duncan nearly killed her days after killing Dylan. She said that he gave her the choice to be killed either by strangulation or with a gun. Shasta chose the former, and Duncan proceeded to wrap a rope around her neck and tightly pull it, causing Shasta to start suffocating. However, she summoned enough breath to beg Duncan to stop, using his nickname, "Jet", and he immediately did. He then asked her if she would like to meet his mother, to which she responded yes, and they drove back toward Coeur d'Alene and stopped at the Denny's restaurant where Shasta was rescued.

== Other crimes ==
Duncan's arrest led the FBI to launch a nationwide review of unsolved missing child cases. He was implicated as a possible suspect in several crimes that occurred between 1994 and 1997 when he was on parole and between 2000 and 2005 when he was free from prison. Although he was cleared as a suspect in some cases, authorities in California and Washington had enough evidence to believe Duncan had committed unsolved murders in their jurisdictions.

=== Anthony Martinez ===
On April 4, 1997, 10-year-old Anthony Michael Martinez was playing with friends in the front yard of his home in Beaumont, California, when an unknown man approached the group asking for help in finding a missing cat. The boys initially agreed to help the man. Once they looked in an alleyway and did not find the cat, they stopped their search. After telling the man they couldn't find the cat, the man grabbed Martinez at knifepoint and threw him into his vehicle. After a two-week search, Martinez's body was found nude and partially decomposed in Indio, California, on April 19. Investigators noted that he had been sexually assaulted and bound with duct tape. Although a composite sketch of the suspect was made available and a partial fingerprint was taken from the duct tape found on Martinez's body, the case eventually went cold.

In July 2005, bloggers noticed similarities between Duncan and the composite sketch in the Martinez case and between Duncan's vehicle and the one Martinez's assailant was driving. The FBI and National Center for Missing and Exploited Children became involved and, in turn, contacted Riverside County authorities. Riverside authorities were able to match the fingerprint taken from Martinez's body to Duncan, and on August 3, the Riverside County Sheriff's Department officially announced Duncan's connection with the Martinez case. FBI agents reported that Duncan confessed to the murder in an interview on July 19, 2005, describing the crime as “revenge against society again for sending him back to jail for a probation violation."

=== Sammiejo White and Carmen Cubias ===
After her rescue, Shasta told investigators that Duncan had told her about other crimes he had committed, including the Martinez murder and the 1996 murders of Sammiejo White, aged 11, and her half-sister Carmen Cubias, aged 9, who both vanished on July 6, 1996, after leaving the Crest Motel in Seattle. Their skeletal remains were found on February 10, 1998, in Bothell, Washington. Duncan confessed to beating them to death.

== Trials ==
Duncan had been convicted in three courts: in Idaho district court for the kidnapping and murders of Brenda and Slade Groene and Mark McKenzie; the United States District Court for the District of Idaho for the kidnapping of Shasta and Dylan Groene, the murder of Dylan Groene, and other crimes; and a California superior court, for the kidnapping and murder of Anthony Martinez.

=== Idaho ===
Duncan first appeared in a Kootenai County court on July 13, 2005, where he was charged with three counts of first-degree murder and three counts of first-degree kidnapping, all in conjunction with the deaths of Brenda and Slade Groene and Mark McKenzie. County prosecutors had initially planned to charge Duncan with the kidnappings of Shasta and Dylan; however, they deferred those charges to the federal courts, as transporting children across state lines for sexual exploitation is a federal offense. Trial was set to begin on January 17, 2006, but was delayed until April 4, after the district judge granted a request to the defense for more time to prepare for the trial, and then again to October 26, after the judge in the case stated that, "No one wants to try this case twice, including me." Duncan's attorneys blamed the multiple postponements on the prosecution's insistence on pursuing the death penalty.

On October 16, 2006, shortly after jury selection began, Kootenai County prosecutors and Duncan's attorney reached a plea bargain in which Duncan pleaded guilty to all state charges against him. He was immediately sentenced to three consecutive life sentences without the possibility of parole for the three kidnapping charges. Sentencing on the three murder charges was continued pending the outcome of his federal trial on kidnapping and murder charges; the judge said that if he did not receive the death penalty on the federal charges, he would return to Kootenai County for a death penalty phase on the state murder charges. Over two years later, after being sentenced to death on federal charges, Kootenai County sentenced Duncan to three additional life sentences. Duncan also agreed to cooperate with Kootenai County sheriff's detectives investigating his crimes and provide passwords to encrypted files stored on his computer.

=== Federal ===
On January 18, 2007, Duncan was indicted by a federal grand jury in Coeur d'Alene on ten counts of "kidnapping, kidnapping resulting in death, aggravated sexual abuse of a minor, and sexual exploitation of a child resulting in death", and other crimes related to illegal firearm possession and vehicle theft. He was arraigned the following day at a federal court in Boise, where a judge ordered Duncan to stand trial the following March. Duncan's defense attorneys immediately requested a postponement, which was granted the week the trial was originally scheduled to begin; a new trial date was set for January 22, 2008.

On December 3, 2007, Duncan pleaded guilty to all ten charges against him. As a condition of the agreement, Shasta Groene would not have to testify in the penalty phase of the trial. Due to a gag order, other plea agreement details were not released.

Jury selection for the penalty phase for Duncan's federal trial began on April 14, 2008. During jury selection, he dismissed his attorneys and chose to represent himself. His attorneys objected, asserting he was incompetent to do so, and requested a formal hearing about the issue. The district court ordered an evaluation of Duncan to determine his competence and accepted the evaluator's conclusion that he was competent to proceed without counsel.

On August 27, 2008, after three hours of deliberation, the jury recommended the death penalty, and the judge imposed three death sentences for "kidnapping resulting in death, sexual exploitation of a child resulting in death, and use of a firearm in a violent crime resulting in death", all related to the death of Dylan Groene. On November 3, 2008, Duncan was sentenced to an additional three consecutive terms of life without parole in federal prison for kidnapping Shasta Groene and for sexually abusing Shasta and Dylan.

Duncan's standby counsel filed a notice of appeal. Duncan subsequently wrote to the court and informed it that any appeal was taken "against his wishes". In July 2011, the Ninth Circuit Court of Appeals reversed the district court's decision to permit Duncan to represent himself without first holding a hearing as to his competence to do so and remanded for a hearing as to this issue.

Beginning in September 2012, Duncan was incarcerated at the United States Penitentiary, Terre Haute in Indiana. On December 6, 2013, a federal judge ruled that he was mentally competent when he gave up the right to appeal his death sentence. Psychiatrists working with the prosecution diagnosed Duncan with pedophilia, sexual sadism disorder and antisocial personality disorder with narcissistic traits, but maintained that he was legally sane.

A three-judge panel of the Ninth Circuit U.S. Court of Appeals ruled on March 27, 2015, that a district judge correctly determined that Duncan was mentally competent when he waived his right to appeal his death sentence. On February 28, 2016, the United States Supreme Court denied Duncan's petition to hear his appeal of a federal judge's ruling in December 2013, which had been affirmed by the Ninth Circuit.

On February 28, 2017, a petition for writ of habeas corpus was filed. On September 27, 2017, it was ordered that the government's third motion for extension of time was granted in part and denied in part. The government's response was due October 30, 2017. The petitioner's reply was due on or before January 30, 2018.

=== California ===
On January 18, 2007, the same day Duncan was indicted in federal court, Riverside County officials announced that he was charged with Martinez's murder. Despite attempts by Riverside County officials to extradite Duncan to California, including an appeal by Governor Arnold Schwarzenegger, Duncan's federal trial proceeded. He was eventually extradited to California on January 24, 2009, five months after being sentenced to death by the federal court.

On March 15, 2011, Duncan pleaded guilty to Martinez's murder and was sentenced to two life terms on April 5, 2011. As part of a plea deal, the sentence came without the possibility of parole or right to appeal. Although Duncan could have faced a separate death sentence in addition to the ones he had already been sentenced to in federal court, Riverside County District Attorney Paul Zellerbach justified the life sentence by stating that he had consulted with the Martinez family who wanted closure in the case and that "the federal system will kill him long before the state of California would have seriously considered it."

== "The Fifth Nail" and "Fifth Nail Revelations" ==
Before his arrest for murder, Duncan maintained a personal website titled "The Fifth Nail." According to lore, in addition to the four nails used to pierce the body of Jesus Christ in his crucifixion, there was a fifth nail that was taken away and hidden by the Romans. Duncan adopted the name for his own website and blog. On the website, which depicted Duncan's day-to-day life as a convicted sex offender, he denied being a pedophile and claimed to have been sexually abused as a child.

After being imprisoned, Duncan maintained a Blogspot website titled "Joseph E. Duncan III returns to the web from Federal death row to expose the meaning of the Fifth Nail." All the content on the site was posted by someone using the pseudonym Silenced, who presumably received letters from Duncan to post on the site on his behalf.

John Adams, Duncan's public defender in Kootenai County, and prosecutor Bill Douglas declined to comment on the possibility that Duncan was blogging from prison. Inmates do not have access to the internet, and while outgoing letters are scanned for requests for contraband or for help in planning an escape, they are not read word for word.

== Aftermath ==
The jurors who imposed the death penalty on Duncan were offered counseling for them to cope with the horrific evidence they had to see during the trial. Among the evidence viewed in court was a 33-minute video depicting a nude Duncan torturing, physically and verbally assaulting, and sexually abusing a nude, restrained boy identified as Dylan Groene. The video showed this abuse conducted in various interior areas of what appeared to be a dilapidated, single-level wooden shed or small cabin. Other evidence included human remains, a wire noose (from the cabin interior), and other videos of Duncan's continued torture of Dylan. During one of the videos, a child could be heard screaming in pain while a naked Duncan shouted, "The devil is here, boy, the devil himself … The devil likes to watch children suffer and cry!".

=== Petition for Slade and Dylan's law ===
In 2016, Shasta Groene (then 19 years old) started a petition called Slade and Dylan's Law in honor of her two brothers whom Duncan had murdered. In the petition description, she stated that convicted sex offenders should not be let out of jail. This would effectively mean that the three-strike rule for violent sex offenders be reduced to one strike. By the time the petition closed, it had 51,820 supporters.

== Imprisonment ==
Duncan was imprisoned on federal death row at the United States Penitentiary in Terre Haute, Indiana. Through his Blogspot, he gave updates on his life from inside prison and described what life was like for him on federal death row. According to him, he rarely interacted with other death row prisoners and actively chose not to speak with them or engage in conversation, claiming he did not really socialize with anyone at all. He would only speak to other prisoners when required to do so. Despite this, he claimed to have never received trouble from other inmates and only received harassment occasionally from a handful of correctional officers.

In July 2019, the United States federal government announced that they would be resuming executions after a nearly two-decade hiatus. Duncan claimed he was "relieved" to hear this news, as in his opinion, being executed via lethal injection would be a much "better" and "cleaner" way to die than dying of natural causes in prison, which is what he feared the most. He claimed he was worried that the government would never get around to executing him. Duncan said of the five federal prisoners selected for execution (Lezmond Mitchell, Wesley Ira Purkey, Daniel Lewis Lee, Alfred Bourgeois, and Dustin Lee Honken) that he was acquainted with four of them but would call none of them his friend. He claimed everyone on federal death row would be "better off" if they were executed.

== Death ==
In October 2020, Duncan underwent brain surgery after he was diagnosed with glioblastoma. He declined any treatment and rejected chemotherapy and radiation therapy. Medical staff at the Federal Bureau of Prisons estimated he had between six and twelve months left to live. He died on March 28, 2021, at the age of 58. His body was cremated.

== See also ==
- Kidnapping of Jayme Closs (2018), during which Jake Patterson confessed to murdering a family to kidnap the 13-year-old girl
- List of serial killers in the United States
