= Murder of Pamela Butler =

1999 murder in Missouri, US

Pamela Butler
- Pamela Butler, pictured before her death in 1999
- Born: March 13, 1989; Kansas City, Kansas, U.S.
- Died: October 12, 1999 (aged 10); Grain Valley, Missouri, U.S.
- Cause of death: Strangulation
- Occupation: Student
- Known for: Victim of a kidnap-murder case

Pamela Irene Butler (March 13, 1989 – October 12, 1999) was a ten-year-old American girl who was kidnapped, raped, and murdered by Keith Dwayne Nelson (November 23, 1974 – August 28, 2020) in October 1999. Nelson kidnapped Butler while she was rollerblading in front of her house in Kansas City, Kansas. He then took her to a forest in Grain Valley, Missouri, where he raped her before strangling her to death with a wire. Nelson pleaded guilty to the charges pertaining to the murder of Butler and he was sentenced to death by a federal jury in November 2001. Nelson was incarcerated for nearly 21 years before he was put to death by lethal injection on August 28, 2020, becoming the fifth person to be executed by the U.S. federal government after the resumption of federal executions in July 2020.

== Murder ==
On October 12, 1999, 24-year-old Keith Dwayne Nelson planned to kidnap, rape, and murder a young girl in the Kansas City area. That afternoon, ten-year-old Pamela Irene Butler was rollerblading in front of her house in Kansas City, Kansas, after returning home from a trip to buy cookies. Butler, then a fifth-grade student at Fiske Elementary, was kidnapped by Nelson right in front of her 11-year-old sister, Penny Butler, who screamed at the sight of her sister's kidnapping. While Nelson drove off with Pamela in his white pick-up truck, he made a rude gesture to her sister. Several other witnesses also saw the kidnapping and they managed to take down the registration number of Nelson's truck. The police were alerted to the situation, which hit the news nationwide.

Nelson drove for a distance before he reached Grain Valley, Missouri, where he raped Butler in a forest before he used a piece of wire to strangle her to death. After murdering Butler, Nelson disposed of her body in a wooded area near a church. At some point, Nelson's truck was spotted by a custodian from the church, and together with his wife, the custodian lodged a police report after they looked at the news story of Butler's abduction and the description of the truck she was last seen dragged into. The truck was gone by the time the police arrived at where it was spotted, but it was found abandoned a day later in Kansas City, Missouri.

A police manhunt was thereafter conducted to arrest Nelson. Two days after the kidnapping and murder of Butler, on October 14, 1999, Nelson was discovered hiding under a bridge by a civilian employee of the police department, and upon being spotted, Nelson fled into the river in an attempt to escape. After he reached the shore, he was surrounded by railroad workers who held him until authorities arrived. When one of the onlookers confronted Nelson with the question of where Butler was, Nelson, whose arrest was broadcast live on television, responded by saying that he knew where she was but would not tell them. The following day, police discovered Butler's body in a wooded area behind Grain Valley Christian Church. The gruesome discovery was also broadcast live on local television, and the U.S. Attorney held a live press conference from the site. Further investigation revealed that Butler had been raped and strangled with wire. DNA from seminal fluid found in Butler's underwear matched Nelson's DNA. Nelson was thus officially under arrest for kidnapping, raping, and murdering ten-year-old Pamela Butler.

Butler's family and friends were reportedly devastated over her death, and many remembered her fondly as a straight-A student and sweet girl. Butler's mother was grateful for the community support rendered to their family throughout the ordeal. Experts also called for the need to appease the anxiety and worries of children over random violence in light of Butler's death.

Hundreds of people came to Butler's funeral to pay respects. A classmate of Butler also offered to sing at Butler's funeral.

== Keith Dwayne Nelson ==
=== Personal life ===
Keith Dwayne Nelson

Keith Dwayne Nelson was born in Texas on November 23, 1974. He moved to Missouri as a child. He had four siblings, including a twin brother.

According to court documents and his family, Nelson did not have a happy childhood and his family background was generally disadvantaged. Nelson was said to be born premature and it allegedly contributed to several health complications. Nelson was reportedly diagnosed with dyslexia and did not fare well in his schooling years, often getting into fights or having behavioral problems, and was not academically inclined. His mother Nancy Nelson also neglected him and his brothers. Kenneth Morse, Nelson's biological father, was said to be extremely violent and often physically abused his wife and children, including Nelson. He was a victim of sexual abuse by one of his mother's boyfriends in his childhood, and he was also sexually assaulted during his time in the juvenile detention center at age 14.

When he reached adulthood, Nelson met his girlfriend, Kerri Dillion, and their son was born sometime after Nelson's arrest for murder in 1999. Nelson also took care of his girlfriend's son from her previous relationship. Prior to murdering Butler, Nelson was previously convicted of lesser offenses, three times for theft (all in Missouri) and once for attempting to escape custody.

On September 29, 1999, Nelson allegedly told a co-worker that he wanted to kidnap, rape, and kill a woman, stating that it would not make a difference since he would be back in prison for another offense. He attempted to carry out this plan on October 2, 1999, when he held a knife to the throat of Michanne Mattson, a medical student, and tried to force her into his vehicle but she managed to escape. After Nelson's arrest a month later for Butler's murder, Mattson was able to identify Nelson as the abductor who attacked her.

=== Trial and sentencing ===
On October 21, 1999, Nelson was charged with the kidnapping, rape, and murder of Pamela Butler per federal law. Because he kidnapped Butler in Kansas and took her across state lines to Missouri, where she was murdered, the case became federal under the Federal Kidnapping Act. In April 2000, the prosecution officially announced that they would seek the death penalty for Nelson over the abduction-killing of Butler.

On October 25, 2001, after standing trial at the U.S. District Court for the Western District of Missouri, Nelson pleaded guilty to a single charge of interstate kidnapping resulting in murder under the Federal Kidnapping Act. Nelson also faced another charge of sexual assault pertaining to the rape of Butler prior to the killing, but per the conditions of his plea bargain, the prosecution agreed to drop the rape charge against him. Under federal law, Nelson's conviction would warrant either the death penalty or life imprisonment without the possibility of parole. The trial was postponed at one point after Nelson was hospitalized for undisclosed reasons, which was later revealed to be a suicide attempt by an anti-depressant pill overdose.

During the sentencing submissions, the defense urged the jury to settle on a life sentence, bringing up Nelson's broken childhood, his past experiences of being a victim of child abuse and sexual assault, and the possible harmful implications of his premature birth on his brain. They pressed for the jury to consider the chances of rehabilitation for Nelson should his life be spared, stating that he was a devoted son and brother to his mother and siblings, as well as being a caring guardian to his girlfriend's son, and the parental role he would assume for the son he had with his girlfriend. They also revealed that two of Nelson's brothers were diagnosed with schizophrenia.

In rebuttal, the prosecution argued that Nelson's troubled childhood and other sympathetic circumstances of his life were not an excuse for his heinous actions of raping and murdering a young girl of Butler's age. They pointed out that none of Nelson's four siblings went around committing serious crimes, and they lived decent lives with good jobs. They added that Nelson's case was undeserving of any ounce of mercy for he had cruelly murdered Butler in cold blood and deprived her of both her dignity and right to life. Additionally, they added he should be wholly responsible for his barbaric choices of committing a murder in the most horrific way possible to a child no matter how bad his upbringing, since his character was "rotten to the core". As such, they refuted the defense's submissions for leniency and pressed for the jury to return with a unanimous death penalty verdict (U.S. laws require a unanimous decision to sentence a person to death; otherwise, life imprisonment was mandatory).

On November 28, 2001, after two hours of deliberations on the sentence, the jury unanimously recommended the death penalty for Nelson. In accordance to the jury's verdict, Justice Fernando J. Gaitan sentenced 27-year-old Keith Dwayne Nelson to death by lethal injection during an official hearing convened on March 11, 2002.

After his sentencing in 2002, Nelson spent more than a decade appealing against his sentence several times. However, between 2003 and 2018, his appeals were all rejected.

== Nelson's execution ==
For the following 21 years of his life since his arrest, Nelson remained incarcerated on death row at USP Terre Haute, Indiana, the only prison in all of America where prisoners of federal death row were detained.

On June 16, 2020, the Justice Department announced that there were four people scheduled to be executed by the U.S. federal government in the following two months. Nelson was included in the list of the four inmates whose execution dates were scheduled; the other three were white supremacist Daniel Lewis Lee, rapist-murderer Wesley Ira Purkey, and Iowa mass killer Dustin Lee Honken. Nelson's death warrant listed his scheduled execution date as August 28, 2020, while the rest were arranged to be executed in July of that same year.

Prior to the release of Nelson's death warrant, the last person executed by the U.S. federal government was Louis Jones Jr., a Gulf War veteran who was found guilty of raping and murdering a female soldier; he was executed by lethal injection in 2003. Despite their respective last-minute appeals, Lee, Purkey, and Honken were all executed as scheduled, which ended the 17-year long moratorium on federal executions and garnered controversy due to the COVID-19 pandemic in the United States and the unusually high rate of executions scheduled and carried out by the federal government. The Justice Department stated that the four men, including Nelson, were selected due to them exhausting all avenues of appeal and their convictions were considered safe, and a common factor was that these four people were child killers found guilty under federal law, which added to the department's pursuit for justice.

As a final bid to escape the death penalty, Nelson's lawyers filed appeals to delay his execution. They argued that the use of pentobarbital, the drug used for federal executions by lethal injection, had violated the Food, Drug and Cosmetics Act, and several other arguments to support their stance against Nelson's upcoming execution, which included the autopsy results of Wesley Purkey's case, where it reportedly found that Purkey suffered extreme pain due to "pulmonary edema" that arose during his execution, giving rise to sensation akin to drowning. They also argued that Nelson was denied access to any effective trial counsel and the jury sentenced him to death back in 2001 without thorough hearing of the mitigating circumstances in his case, including the possibility of brain damage caused by premature birth, mental illness, and both physical and sexual abuse as a child.

On August 27, 2020, the eve of Nelson's execution, Justice Tanya Chutkan of the U.S. District Court in Washington, D.C. ordered a halt to the preplanned execution on the grounds that the federal lethal injection protocol violated a federal law regulating prescription drugs. However, the stay of execution was immediately overturned by the higher courts upon the prosecution's appeal, which ruled that Nelson should be executed as originally scheduled.

On August 28, 2020, 45-year-old Keith Dwayne Nelson was officially put to death by lethal injection at the USP Terre Haute. Nine minutes after he was administered with a single dose of pentobarbital, Nelson was pronounced dead at 4.32 pm. He had no last words. Nelson's execution came just two days after Lezmond Mitchell, the only Native American criminal on federal death row, who was executed for the 2001 double murder of Alyce Slim and her granddaughter Tiffany Lee.

Shortly after the execution of Nelson, Butler's mother Cherri West said in a media statement that she would never expect Nelson to show any remorse for murdering her daughter, as she remembered how Nelson behaved rudely towards her family in court back in 2001 when he was sentenced to death, and she found it fair that Nelson should be executed for taking her daughter's life in cold blood. Nelson's defense counsel, on the other hand, stated that the execution of Nelson did not in any way make the world a better place, and they stated they knew Nelson as someone other than a killer, describing him as a changed man full of "his humanity, his compassion, and his sense of humor."

According to Christopher Vialva, another federal death row inmate, Nelson talked a lot in the final two days of his life. Vialva, along with William LeCroy, joined Nelson on the death watch range after they were also given execution dates. Vialva believed Nelson talked a lot because he feared the silence. Vialva further stated that Nelson reached a point where he just wanted to die so it could all be over with. Nelson reportedly was angry when his lawyers won him a stay of execution as according to Vialva, Nelson had accepted his death and knew it would ultimately not save him in the long run, rather it would just prolong his execution. Nelson advised Vialva to get his affairs in order before his date of execution and told him he was a good person. Right before Nelson was taken to the execution chamber, he vomited violently, before turning to Vialva and LeCroy and saying "A'ight Will, a'ight Chris." Both Vialva and LeCroy were executed a month later in September 2020.

== Aftermath ==
In April 2017, 18 years after Pamela Butler was murdered, her eldest sister Casey M. Eaton was shot and killed by her former boyfriend, Enemencio Lansdown, at a block away from the memorial set up for Butler. Lansdown was later charged, and sentenced to 20 years and seven months in prison for manslaughter in April 2018. In light of Eaton's death, Butler's mother Cherri West spoke about the grief and pain of losing a child to homicide a second time after years since losing Butler.

Keith Dwayne Nelson was the fifth person to be executed by the U.S. federal government after the resumption of federal executions in July 2020. In the aftermath of Nelson's death sentence, eight more people were controversially executed by the federal government between September 2020 and January 2021, before a moratorium was imposed on all remaining federal death sentences upon Joe Biden's succession as U.S. president after the end of Donald Trump's presidency during the same month when Dustin Higgs became the 13th and last federal death row prisoner to be executed.

A year after Nelson died, Sister Barbara Battista, a Roman Catholic nun who was a staunch opponent of the death penalty, stated that she chose to accompany Nelson and offered him prayers in the execution chamber during the final minutes of his life, as she believed that no matter her feelings towards capital punishment or how heinous the actions of the killer were, she felt that every person on the verge of execution deserved the right of having someone's accompaniment and provide them spiritual support.

== See also ==
- Capital punishment by the United States federal government
- List of people executed by the United States federal government
- List of people executed in the United States in 2020

Executions carried out by the United States federal government
Preceded by Lezmond Mitchell August 26, 2020	Keith Nelson; August 28, 2020	Succeeded by William LeCroy Jr. September 22, 2020
Executions carried out in the United States
Preceded by Lezmond Mitchell – Federal government August 26, 2020	Keith Nelson – Federal government August 28, 2020	Succeeded by William LeCroy Jr. – Federal government September 22, 2020
