= Alfred Bourgeois =

American executed for murder by the U.S. federal government

- Police mugshot
- Born: June 20, 1964; LaPlace, Louisiana, U.S.
- Died: December 11, 2020 (aged 56); USP Terre Haute, Indiana, U.S.
- Status: Executed by lethal injection
- Conviction: First degree murder
- Penalty: Death (March 16, 2004)

Details
- Victims: Jakaren Harrison, 2
- Date: June 27, 2002
- Locations: Naval Air Station Corpus Christi, Texas
- Imprisoned at: United States Penitentiary, Terre Haute

Alfred Bourgeois (June 20, 1964 – December 11, 2020) was a former truck driver who was executed by the U.S. federal government in 2020. Bourgeois was convicted of the murder of his toddler daughter Jakaren Harrison (nicknamed JaJa), whom he tortured for weeks and finally killed inside his truck in June 2002. Bourgeois was found guilty and sentenced to death by a federal jury in March 2004, since his crime took place on a military base in Texas where he was making a delivery. Bourgeois, who maintained his innocence throughout his life, was incarcerated for a total of 18 years before he was put to death via lethal injection on December 11, 2020.

== Background ==
Alfred Bourgeois was born on June 20, 1964, and lived in LaPlace, Louisiana. A long-haul truck driver, he was married with two daughters when he was arrested in 2002 for the murder of his toddler daughter, whom he fathered through another relationship.

In April 2002, Bourgeois was involved in a paternity suit with a woman from Texas. The woman, Katrina Harrison, a former lover of Bourgeois, claimed her two-year-old daughter, Jakaren Harrison (also known as "JG" in court documents), was the biological daughter of Bourgeois, and after Bourgeois agreed to do a paternity test, the test returned with a positive result in May 2002, and Bourgeois was granted temporary custody of the girl.

However, during the following six weeks Harrison spent with her birth father, she was subjected to callous and relentless abuse by Bourgeois. He often physically assaulted the child, using various objects like electrical cords, a shoe, a plastic bat, and a belt to beat Harrison. He also sexually abused Harrison and burned her feet with a cigarette lighter, and he forced her to sleep on a training toilet due to her poor toilet training.

== Murder of Jakaren Harrison ==
On June 27, 2002, two-year-old Jakaren Harrison traveled with her father, Alfred Bourgeois, from Louisiana to Texas while the latter made a delivery at Naval Air Station Corpus Christi. While Bourgeois backed into a loading dock, Harrison accidentally jostled a potty chair, tipping it over. An enraged Bourgeois grabbed Harrison by her shoulders and slammed her head on the windows and dashboard four times. The crime was witnessed by both Bourgeois's wife and eldest daughter.

Harrison was rushed to a hospital, but died of her injuries the following day. Bourgeois told investigators that Harrison suffered from a bad fall. An autopsy report revealed both trauma from the attack as well as previous injuries due to a history of abuse.

== Trial, death row and appeals ==
Soon after his arrest, 38-year-old Alfred Bourgeois was charged with capital murder under the American federal laws. Since Bourgeois committed the murder within the perimeters of a Texas military base, he was tried in a federal court in Texas instead of the state courts for the offense.

Bourgeois, who stood trial before a federal jury in the U.S. District Court for the Southern District of Texas, protested his innocence and denied that he raped or killed Harrison and added that he was hurt over his daughter's death, and he also blamed his wife as the real perpetrator of the murder. However, eight people, most of whom were Bourgeois's relatives, testified for the prosecution, stating that Bourgeois was often violent towards them, either making threats or assaulting them in recent years. Bourgeois's wife and her biological daughter also testified that they had seen him beating Harrison with a belt until the belt broke. They also witnessed Bourgeois hitting Harrison with an electrical cord. Furthermore, according to a prisoner who interacted with Bourgeois while in jail, Bourgeois allegedly joked to him that Harrison's head "got as big as a watermelon" after he beat the child with a plastic baseball bat.

On March 16, 2004, after a two-week trial, the jury found Bourgeois guilty of murdering his daughter. By a unanimous decision, the jury recommended the death penalty for Bourgeois, and on March 25, 2004, Bourgeois was formally sentenced to death by the trial judge based on the jury's verdict. U.S. Attorney Michael Shelby cited the horrific and cold-blooded nature of Harrison's murder, stating that there was "incomprehensible cruelty" exhibited by Bourgeois during the six-week torture of Harrison and her eventual death, and it was "equally impossible to conceive of a case more deserving of the death penalty" than Harrison's murder.

"If Hell ever publishes a book on cruelty, I'm confident they will devote a chapter to Mr. Bourgeois' conduct. And I'm equally confident he'll be there to personally autograph it."

Between 2005 and 2018, Bourgeois appealed against his conviction and sentence, but all of his appeals were dismissed. Bourgeois's lawyers argued that their client should not be given the death penalty since Bourgeois allegedly had intellectual disabilities and his condition should have prevented him from receiving the death sentence, but none of his arguments were accepted by the higher courts. During the years he spent going on trial and making his appeals, Bourgeois remained on death row at USP Terre Haute in Indiana for more than a decade before his death warrant was first issued. While on death row, Bourgeois took up drawing and he made renditions of members of his legal team, and according to one of Bourgeois's lawyers Shawn Nolan, Bourgeois had not been a troublemaker during his incarceration and had a good disciplinary record.

== First death warrant and stay of execution ==
In July 2019, U.S. Attorney General William Barr announced that the federal government would resume executing prisoners on federal death row, 16 years after Gulf War veteran Louis Jones Jr. was executed for the rape-murder of a female soldier. Barr revealed that five prisoners would be executed between November 2019 and January 2020. Bourgeois was among the first batch of prisoners to receive their death warrants, and his execution date was slated to be on January 13, 2020. The other four were white supremacist Daniel Lewis Lee (December 9, 2019), carjacker-killer Lezmond Mitchell (December 11, 2019), rapist-killer Wesley Ira Purkey (December 13, 2019), and Iowa serial killer Dustin Lee Honken (January 15, 2020).

Barr reasoned that the selection of Bourgeois and the four aforementioned was due to all of them being convicted of murder pertaining to vulnerable victims, mainly the elderly and children, so as to ensure that justice was served for each of the victims to provide closure to their families. However, this move attracted criticism from opponents of capital punishment, one of whom stated that the federal death penalty was "arbitrary, racially biased, and rife with poor lawyering and junk science", and there were calls for the upcoming executions of Bourgeois and the other four to be delayed in favor of a review of the law.

The respective lawyers representing Bourgeois and three of the four men – Lee, Honken and Purkey – filed a motion and sought to delay their executions, on the grounds that the use of pentobarbital for their upcoming executions may violate the Federal Death Penalty Act of 1994, and a stay of execution was granted for the four men by Judge Tanya Chutkan on November 20, 2019 (Mitchell's execution was stayed by a separate appeal). The legal representatives of the government appealed all the way to the Supreme Court, which refused to overturn the injunction filed by Bourgeois and the other three plaintiffs and sent the case back to the D.C. Circuit for further consideration. In April 2020, the U.S. D.C. Circuit Court of Appeals lifted the injunction by a majority decision of two to one, allowing the executions to proceed. Another ruling by the Supreme Court also concluded that the executions should move forward after dismissing the cases of the prisoners slated for execution.

In the aftermath of this injunction, Lee became the first to be executed by lethal injection, after his execution was scheduled on July 16, 2020, which ended the 17-year moratorium on federal executions. Purkey and Honken were both likewise executed later that same month, and Mitchell himself, who was not involved in the injunction, was executed in August 2020.

In March 2020, Bourgeois filed a separate appeal to seek to delay his execution on the grounds of low intelligence that amounted to intellectual disability, a factor that would prevent a criminal from being executed. This stay order, however, was overturned by the higher courts. Another appeal made on similar grounds was heard in October 2020 before it was dismissed by the United States Court of Appeals for the Seventh Circuit.

== Execution ==
In November 2020, four months after the resumption of federal executions, a second death warrant was issued for Bourgeois, scheduling his new execution date as December 11, 2020. Four more convicted murderers also had their executions scheduled between December 2020 and January 2021. The scheduling of these five executions fell within the lame-duck period of the administration of former U.S. President Donald Trump, who had lost his re-election bid to Joe Biden, and it was "unprecedented" for federal death sentences to be carried out during the final days of an American presidency; widespread criticism arose at the sudden spate of executions scheduled during this particular period.

In a final bid to escape the death penalty, Bourgeois lodged a last-minute appeal to stave off his execution, once again raising arguments regarding his intellectual disability making him ineligible for execution. Hours before the execution was to proceed, the U.S. Supreme Court rejected the follow-up appeal for the same motion.

On December 11, 2020, more than 18 years after murdering two-year-old Jakaren Harrison, 56-year-old Alfred Bourgeois was formally put to death by lethal injection at USP Terre Haute. In his last words, Bourgeois defiantly maintained his innocence and never apologized for his crime. He stated he forgave all those who plotted and schemed against him and planted false evidence to frame him for the murder, and he was pronounced dead about 20 minutes after being administered a single dose of pentobarbital. For his last meal, Bourgeois ordered seafood-stuffed mushrooms, a platter of fried shrimp, shrimp Alfredo pasta, six buttered biscuits and cheesecake from a local restaurant chain, Red Lobster.

Victor Abreu, a lawyer of Bourgeois's, criticized the execution of his client, stating that the country had killed a man with an intellectual disability despite the law barring such executions. On the other hand, Harrison's surviving kin reportedly described the execution of Bourgeois as an act of justice for Harrison, whom they proclaimed would "forever be loved and missed," and they called Bourgeois a "monster" for taking her life in cold blood, although they lamented that it took too long for justice to be served for Harrison.

Bourgeois's execution came merely a day after Brandon Bernard's death sentence was carried out for a 1999 double murder of pastors from Iowa, in spite of a high-profile clemency campaign launched to request that Bernard's death sentence be commuted to life imprisonment.

== Aftermath ==
Bourgeois was the tenth person to be executed by the federal government and also the 17th and last person to be executed in the whole of the U.S. during the year 2020. The execution of Bourgeois marked the highest number of executions authorized by the federal government since 1896 during the second term of President Grover Cleveland, and 14 death sentences were carried out during that year.

The executions of Bourgeois and Bernard, who were both African-American, also sparked outrage among the opponents of capital punishment due to the alleged disproportionality of the death penalty, which was reportedly found to have affected a larger number of African-Americans than that of white people. A report released by non-profit organization Death Penalty Information Center revealed that there was an over-representation of African-Americans on state and federal death rows, and case studies demonstrated that African-Americans who killed white people are far more likely to be sentenced to death than white people who killed African-American people. It also came to attention that another two African-American men, Corey Johnson and Dustin Higgs, who were both convicted of murder, were scheduled for execution in January 2021. Despite the high rate of executions on the federal level, a total of 17 executions happened in the whole of the U.S., which was a historic low in the American history of executions, and the sudden drastic increase in federal executions during the final days of Trump's presidency was a stark contrast to the decline in the practice of capital punishment that has been the trend in the U.S. for several years, and it garnered criticisms over Trump's decision to authorize a large number of executions during his lame-duck period.

Elizabeth Bruenig, an opinion writer of The New York Times and one of the journalists who witnessed the execution, recounted that while she opposed the death penalty and found no justifiable purpose in it, she herself considered the murder of Harrison as "cruel, senseless, depraved" and she could feel how "vivid, palpable, fleshly" the suffering which Harrison underwent during the final six weeks of her life before she met an untimely end. Bruenig's article revealed that Harrison's mother died in December 2002 due to a fatal stabbing by her former boyfriend, and Harrison's grandmother herself also died thereafter, leaving no immediate family members of Harrison to witness Bourgeois's execution. Legal analyst Elliot Williams also stated that the federal death penalty should be permanently removed as it was an act of vengeance but not justice.

In February 2021, it was revealed that during the week after the executions of Bernard and Bourgeois, there were 33 out of a total of 47 prisoners on death row at the federal prison who tested positive for COVID-19, an infectious coronavirus that resulted in a worldwide pandemic since the start of 2020. It was speculated that the recent executions of Bourgeois and Bernard were likely the reason for COVID-19 to spread rapidly among the death row population of USP Terre Haute.

== See also ==
- Capital punishment by the United States federal government
- List of people executed by the United States federal government
- List of people executed in the United States in 2020

Executions carried out by the United States federal government
Preceded by Brandon Bernard December 10, 2020	Alfred Bourgeois; December 11, 2020	Succeeded by Lisa Montgomery January 13, 2021
Executions carried out in the United States
Preceded by Brandon Bernard – Federal government December 10, 2020	Alfred Bourgeois – Federal government December 11, 2020	Succeeded by Lisa Montgomery – Federal government January 13, 2021
