= Murder of Joann Lee Tiesler =

2001 murder in Georgia

Joann Lee Tiesler
- Tiesler in the late 1990s
- Born: July 2, 1971; Tennessee, U.S.
- Died: October 7, 2001 (aged 30); Cherry Log, Georgia, U.S.
- Cause of death: Stab wounds
- Resting place: Harpeth Hills Memory Gardens
- Occupation: Nurse

On October 7, 2001, American nurse Joann Lee Tiesler, 30, was raped and stabbed to death in her home in Cherry Log, Georgia, by William LeCroy Jr., her neighbor and a former U.S. soldier. LeCroy, a convicted sex offender who had violated the terms of his supervised release, had broken into Tiesler's house while she was out shopping, waited for her to come home, then bound, sexually assaulted, and stabbed her to death. He was arrested by the Federal Bureau of Investigation (FBI) on October 11, 2001, while attempting to flee to Canada in Tiesler's car. He was sentenced to death in federal court in 2004 and executed by the federal government on September 22, 2020.

== Background ==
Joann Lee Tiesler was an employed nurse in the state of Georgia. Born in Tennessee, she attended Franklin High School in Franklin, Tennessee, where she also played for the girls' soccer team. Upon graduation she attended Berry College in Rome, Georgia and obtained a master's degree at Vanderbilt University. As a family nurse practitioner, she was able to obtain work in the National Health Corps. During her work from 1999 to 2001, she successfully treated numerous patients who mostly lived in the cities of Blue Ridge and Ellijay.

== Murder ==
On Sunday, October 7, 2001, Tiesler and her fiancé visited her native Tennessee in the city of Chattanooga, where they visited a shopping center. After completing their shopping, both returned to their respective homes. None of her friends heard anything from Tiesler for the rest of the day, but the next morning, Monday, October 8, when she failed to show up for an appointment, one of her friends decided to pay her a visit. At approximately 10:30 am, the friend discovered Tielser's dead body. Police were called and the subsequent investigation revealed her vehicle, a 1996 black Ford Explorer, was missing from her driveway. She had been bound with cable wires, raped, and stabbed numerous times. In addition a .32 caliber pistol she owned was also missing from the home.

== Investigation ==
William LeCroy
- Born: William Emmett LeCroy Jr. April 12, 1970; Marietta, Georgia, U.S.
- Died: September 22, 2020 (aged 50); USP Terre Haute, Terre Haute, Indiana, U.S.
- Cause of death: Execution by lethal injection
- Motive: sexual assault, believed it would provide freedom from witchcraft spell
- Convictions: Federal; Carjacking resulting in death Possession of a short-barreled shotgun Georgia; Aggravated child molestation Statutory rape Aggravated assault (3 counts); Burglary (10 counts)
- Penalty: Federal; Death (March 10, 2004); Georgia; 20 years imprisonment

Details
- Victims: Joann Lee Tiesler, 30
- Date: October 7, 2001
- Country: United States
- State: Georgia

Investigators quickly established their prime suspect, William Emmett LeCroy Jr., a local sex offender who lived a few houses away from Tiesler. Evidence emerged that revealed LeCroy had been spying on Tiesler with binoculars. In an examination of LeCroy's background authorities learned that he joined the United States Army at age 17 but had been discharged after going AWOL. After the army he became known as a recidivist, having perpetrated numerous crimes in and out of jail. He eventually received a 20-year sentence for aggravated assault, burglary, statutory rape, and child molestation. LeCroy also received an additional 5-year sentence in federal prison. He had been released from prison in August 2001. As a condition of his supervised release, LeCroy was ordered to undergo a psychosexual evaluation in September 2001. However, he left prematurely and only agreed to return to submit to the testing after being warned by his probation officer that he risked being sent back to prison if he refused again. The evaluation was rescheduled for October 22, 2001. However, LeCroy then fled again. He committed several robberies and made plans to flee the country.

He was also known for obsessing over witchcraft. While at large, police alerted the public of LeCroy and considered him "extremely dangerous".

=== Arrest ===
On October 11, Canada–United States border police were doing routine vehicle inspections at a border entrance area in Minnesota. Authorities checked the license plate of one vehicle, a Ford Explorer, and they successfully matched the license plate to Tiesler's missing car. Following this, LeCroy, the one in the car, was arrested. Federal authorities soon arrived in Minnesota. While in custody in Cook County Jail in Grand Marais he confessed to killing Tiesler, describing what he did in detail; LeCroy told authorities he struck Tiesler with a shotgun, bound, raped, slashed her throat open and stabbed her numerous times in the back, eventually leading to her death, before stealing her car. He also told the FBI that he was attempting to cross the Canada–United States border to hide out in Canada to avoid murder charges.

At one point, LeCroy claimed he thought Tiesler was his old babysitter who molested him, but due to Tiesler being one year younger than him, that claim proved to be unlikely. Since LeCroy had stolen Tiesler's car shortly after killing her, he was indicted in a federal court of carjacking (18 U.S.C. § 2119). According to the law, if a carjacking results in the death of one of multiple persons, it could lead to a life sentence or a death sentence for those responsible.

== LeCroy's trial and execution ==
The trial began in early 2004. LeCroy's attorneys admitted early on that he did kill Tiesler, but argued the murder was not preplanned nor fit the profile of a federal crime. They stated that it would have made more sense to have LeCroy tried in the state of Georgia rather than in federal court, as they argued the case did not fit the qualification for the federal carjacking statute, which had been passed in 1992. They maintained that, given LeCroy's background of robberies, that he was simply burglarizing Tiesler's home when she unexpectedly walked in, and that the sexual assault, murder, and carjacking were not done with premeditation. Prosecutors supported their claim that LeCroy had deliberately planned out the rape and murder, given evidence of him spying on her through a neighboring house, and in the days leading up to killing her he had bought cable wires which he used to tie her up. In March, a grand jury convicted LeCroy on all counts. On March 10, he was sentenced to death.

LeCroy exhausted his appeals on March 9, 2015, but at the time, the U.S. federal government had a de-facto moratorium on capital punishment. LeCroy received an execution date after U.S. Attorney General William Barr ordered the resumption of federal executions in 2019.

His attorneys argued for sympathy towards LeCroy's family, as his brother Chad, a Georgia State Trooper, was murdered during a traffic stop in 2010, and they claimed executing LeCroy would only add to their suffering. On September 22, 2020, after president Donald Trump rejected a last-minute stay of execution, LeCroy was executed by lethal injection at USP Terre Haute in Terre Haute, Indiana. His execution was the sixth that year conducted by the federal government. LeCroy had originally requested KFC for his last meal, however, it was denied, as he was told that the bones in the chicken presented a security risk. He then asked for Pizza Hut as his last meal, which was approved.

== Memorial ==
In 2002, Tiesler's mother Janie Wells constructed an outdoor classroom and memorial garden in Bowie Nature Park in honor of Joann.

== See also ==
- List of people executed by the United States federal government
- List of people executed in the United States in 2020

Executions carried out by the United States federal government
Preceded by Keith Nelson August 28, 2020	William LeCroy Jr. September 22, 2020	Succeeded by Christopher Vialva September 24, 2020
Executions carried out in the United States
Preceded by Keith Nelson – Federal government August 28, 2020	William LeCroy Jr. – Federal government September 22, 2020	Succeeded by Christopher Vialva – Federal government September 24, 2020
