= Tilly, Arkansas =

- Unincorporated community
- Piney's position in Arkansas. Tilly, Arkansas (the United States)
- Coordinates: 35°43′12″N 92°49′59″W
- Country: United States
- State: Arkansas
- County: Pope
- Elevation: 1,946 ft (593 m)
- Time zone: UTC-6 (Central (CST))
  - Summer (DST): UTC-5 (CDT)
- ZIP code: 72679
- GNIS feature ID: 73873

Tilly is an unincorporated community in Smyrna Township, Pope County, Arkansas, United States near the head of the Middle Fork of the Little Red River.

It is also near the intersection of Arkansas 16 and Arkansas 27. Tilly has a general store that was established in 1939 by Alfred & Avis Fountain. The store has a local post office branch located within. The cemetery located in Tilly is the "Union Hill Cemetery" and has a cemetery building adjacent to the cemetery.

In January 1996, Tilly was the scene of a triple murder, when gun dealer William Mueller, his wife, Nancy, and their eight-year-old daughter, Sarah, were abducted, tortured, and murdered in their own home by white supremacists Chevie Kehoe and Daniel Lewis Lee. Kehoe later received a life sentence for the crime, while Lee was sentenced to death and executed.
