= List of people executed in the United States in 2020 =

Seventeen people, all male, were executed in the United States in 2020, sixteen by lethal injection and one by electrocution. The most recent execution by electrocution occurred this year. The federal government of the United States executed ten people in 2020, ending a hiatus on federal executions which had lasted for over 17 years. State executions dropped significantly in 2020 compared to previous years, primarily due to the COVID-19 pandemic in the United States. One condemned inmate, Jimmy Fletcher Meders, was originally scheduled to be executed in Georgia on January 16, 2020. However, the Georgia State Board of Pardons and Paroles commuted his death sentence to life imprisonment without the possibility of parole just hours before his scheduled execution.

== List of people executed in the United States in 2020 ==
No.	Date of execution	Name	Age of person			Gender	Ethnicity	State	Method	Ref.
No.	Date of execution	Name	At execution	At offense	Age difference	Gender	Ethnicity	State	Method	Ref.
1	January 15, 2020	John Steven Gardner	64	49	15	Male	White	Texas	Lethal injection	
2	January 29, 2020	Donnie Cleveland Lance	66	43	23	Male	White	Georgia	Lethal injection	
3	February 6, 2020	Abel Revilla Ochoa	47	29	18	Male	Hispanic	Texas	Lethal injection	
4	February 20, 2020	Nicholas Todd Sutton	58	23	35	Male	White	Tennessee	Electrocution	
5	March 5, 2020	Nathaniel Ali Woods	43	27	16	Male	Black	Alabama	Lethal injection	
6	May 19, 2020	Walter E. Barton	64	35	29	Male	White	Missouri	Lethal injection	
7	July 8, 2020	Billy Joe Wardlow	45	18	27	Male	White	Texas	Lethal injection	
8	July 14, 2020	Daniel Lewis Lee	47	22	25	Male	White	Federal government	Lethal injection	
9	July 16, 2020	Wesley Ira Purkey	68	46	22	Male	White	Federal government	Lethal injection	
10	July 17, 2020	Dustin Lee Honken	52	25	27	Male	White	Federal government	Lethal injection	
11	August 26, 2020	Lezmond Charles Mitchell	38	20	18	Male	Native American	Federal government	Lethal injection	
12	August 28, 2020	Keith Dwayne Nelson	45	24	21	Male	White	Federal government	Lethal injection	
13	September 22, 2020	William Emmett LeCroy Jr.	50	31	19	Male	White	Federal government	Lethal injection	
14	September 24, 2020	Christopher Andre Vialva	40	19	21	Male	Black	Federal government	Lethal injection	
15	November 19, 2020	Orlando Cordia Hall	49	23	26	Male	Black	Federal government	Lethal injection	
16	December 10, 2020	Brandon Anthony Micah Bernard	40	18	22	Male	Black	Federal government	Lethal injection	
17	December 11, 2020	Alfred Bourgeois	56	38	18	Male	Black	Federal government	Lethal injection	
		Average:	51 years	29 years	22 years					

== Demographics ==
Gender
Male	17	100%
Female	0	0%
Ethnicity
White	10	59%
Black	5	29%
Hispanic	1	6%
Native American	1	6%
State
Federal government	10	59%
Texas	3	18%
Alabama	1	6%
Georgia	1	6%
Missouri	1	6%
Tennessee	1	6%
Method
Lethal injection	16	94%
Electrocution	1	6%
Month
January	2	12%
February	2	12%
March	1	6%
April	0	0%
May	1	6%
June	0	0%
July	4	24%
August	2	12%
September	2	12%
October	0	0%
November	1	6%
December	2	12%
Age
30–39	1	6%
40–49	8	47%
50–59	4	24%
60–69	4	24%
Total	17	100%

== Executions in recent years ==
Number of executions
2021	11
2020	17
2019	22
Total	50

== COVID-19-related problems with scheduling executions ==
Due to the COVID-19 pandemic, a number of executions that had been planned for 2020 were postponed and/or rescheduled. Texas postponed the executions of seven inmates who were due to be executed between March and September, beginning with Carlos Trevino, whose execution was postponed three times (first on March 11, then June 3, and finally September 30). Tennessee also postponed the executions of four inmates who were due to be executed between June and December. In addition, the December 8 execution of Lisa Montgomery by the federal government was postponed by the DC District Court after both of her defense attorneys caught COVID-19. She was executed the following year, on January 13, 2021.

== See also ==
- List of death row inmates in the United States
- List of people executed by the United States federal government
- List of people executed in Texas, 2020–present
- List of people executed in Georgia
- List of people executed in Missouri
- List of people executed in Tennessee
- List of people executed in Alabama

Preceded by 2019	List of people executed in the United States in 2020	Succeeded by 2021
