= Christopher Vialva =

American convicted killer executed in 2020

- Born: Christopher Andre Vialva; May 10, 1980; Killeen, Texas, U.S.
- Died: September 24, 2020 (aged 40); USP Terre Haute, Terre Haute, Indiana, U.S.
- Cause of death: Execution by lethal injection
- Allegiance: 212 Piru Bloods
- Motive: Robbery
- Convictions: First degree murder (2 counts); Carjacking resulting in death
- Penalty: Death (June 13, 2000)

Details
- Victims: Todd Bagley, 26; Stacie Bagley, 28
- Date: June 21, 1999
- Location: Fort Hood, Texas
- Imprisoned at: United States Penitentiary, Terre Haute

Christopher Andre Vialva (May 10, 1980 – September 24, 2020) was an American man who was executed by the United States federal government for the 1999 murders of two Iowa pastors in Fort Hood, Texas. Vialva and his co-accused Brandon Bernard were both given the death penalty in 2000, while three more juveniles involved in the crime were convicted and jailed. Vialva spent 20 years on federal death row before he was executed via lethal injection on September 24, 2020, becoming the seventh person, as well as the first African American, to be executed by the federal government since the resumption of federal executions in July 2020.

== Personal life ==
Born on May 10, 1980, in Killeen, Texas, Christopher Andre Vialva was born to a white mother and African-American father, the latter of whom was a soldier from Trinidad. His parents first met at Fort Benning, Georgia before they married when Vialva's mother, also an Air Force enlistee, was 19. However, the relationship did not last long, and Vialva's mother raised him alone after she left her husband, who was reportedly abusive towards his son and wife. At one point, Vialva's father was also being court-martialed for an unknown offense.

Vialva's mother was disowned by her family – who came from a military background – for having married an African-American, and they were reportedly white supremacists, which reportedly isolated her and her son further. Vialva's mother later on would establish relationships with white men, but these relationships were likewise abusive by nature and all of her partners in these cases rejected Vialva, whose confusion over his racial identity plagued him throughout his formative years. In his schooling years, Vialva was often disciplined for being disruptive but he was not a violent person per the description of his friends and teachers in school.

== Double murder ==
On the afternoon of June 21, 1999, in Fort Hood, Texas, 19-year-old Christopher Vialva, accompanied by four other youths aged between 16 and 18, murdered two youth pastors from Iowa, 26-year-old Todd Bagley and 28-year-old Stacie Bagley.

On the day in question, Vialva and his gang, the 212 Piru Bloods, approached the Bagleys, pretending to ask for a ride at a gas station after they settled on a plan of robbing the two. The Bagleys agreed to bring the five boys for a ride, and upon gaining entry into their car, Vialva held the couple at gunpoint and forced them into the trunk, where they stayed for hours. The couple pleaded for Vialva and his group to release them and spare their lives throughout their confinement, and during this period, Vialva and his accomplices made use of the ATM card stolen from the Bagleys and withdrew money, in addition to stealing the couple's jewelry.

After the gang stopped on the roadside at the Belton Lake recreation area, Vialva directed his four henchmen to splash the interior of the car with lighter fluid, while the Bagleys continued to plead for mercy as they sang "Jesus Loves Me." Vialva then shot both Todd and Stacie in the head with a handgun. After completing the deed, one of Vialva's accomplices, 18-year-old Brandon Bernard, set fire to the car, burning the bodies of the victims and the car before the gang fled the scene. Subsequently, firefighters were alerted to a sighting of the Bagleys' burning car and discovered the bodies when the fire was put out.

Autopsy results later showed that Todd Bagley died from a gunshot wound to his head, but the cause of Stacie Bagley's death remained inconclusive, given that there were possibilities that she died from inhaling the smoke while the car was on fire despite the "lethal" gunshot wound to her head, on the basis that soot particles were found inside the lungs. The prosecution would later argue during the trial of Vialva that the fire caused by Bernard was what caused the death of Stacie.

== Trial and sentencing ==
A few days after the double murder, Vialva and his gang were all arrested for the murders, for which they were all charged.

A year later, at the end of the murder trial, Vialva and one of his co-defendants Brandon Bernard (aged 18 at the time of the murders) were both found guilty of carjacking resulting in death and first-degree murder by a 12-member federal jury in the U.S. District Court for the Western District of Texas. Vialva and Bernard were both sentenced to death by lethal injection on June 13, 2000, and they were sent to federal death row at USP Terre Haute in the state of Indiana. Given the fact that the double murder was committed on a secluded part of the Fort Hood U.S. Army post in the Texan town of Killeen, Vialva and Bernard were both tried and convicted under federal law instead of state law.

The remaining three accomplices, who were minors at the time, were given jail terms for their respective roles in the double murder. Two of them, Terry Terrell Brown and Christopher Michael Lewis, who were both 17 years old at the time of the offense, pleaded guilty to second degree murder and each received 248 months in prison, and they became prosecution witnesses against Bernard and Vialva. Lewis was released from prison on June 23, 2017, while Brown remained in jail for another three years before his release on January 6, 2020.

The fifth and youngest of the gang, Tony Sparks, was 16 at the time of the murders. Sparks was sentenced to life imprisonment without the possibility of parole, and 18 years after he was first incarcerated, his life sentence was reduced to 35 years' jail in March 2018, which included the 214 months he served prior to the commutation. Sparks's tentative release date was slated as April 28, 2030.

A 15-year-old youth named Gregory Hardin Lynch was given a five-year jail term for providing Vialva and his gang with the murder weapons pertaining to the double murder.

== Death row and execution ==
While he was incarcerated on death row, Vialva appealed against his death sentence, but his appeals were all rejected between 2002 and 2018. Through Vialva's appeal process, executions on the federal level were paused due to a moratorium since 2003, when a Gulf War veteran was last executed for a rape-murder case.

Vialva documented much of his life on death row through conversations with his mother, describing his interactions with other inmates. Vialva had conversations when he first arrived on federal death row with domestic terrorist Timothy McVeigh, the perpetrator of the 1995 Oklahoma City bombing, who he communicated with through cell block windows. Vialva also described to his mother the final interactions he had with two other death row inmates scheduled for execution, Lezmond Mitchell and Keith Nelson. Vialva said Mitchell did not say a word to anyone in the final week of his life, while Nelson talked a lot in his last two days, before violently vomiting when it came time for his execution. He advised Vialva to sort his affairs before his date of execution.

Vialva exhausted his appeals on February 29, 2016, but at the time, the U.S. federal government still had a de-facto moratorium on capital punishment.

At the end of July 2020, the same month when the federal government resumed executions, Attorney General William P. Barr announced that the execution dates of both Vialva and another criminal, William Emmett LeCroy Jr., were scheduled; LeCroy, who was found guilty of raping and murdering a woman in 2001, was slated for execution on September 22, 2020, while Vialva's death warrant listed his upcoming execution date as September 24, 2020, two days after LeCroy's execution. Vialva was noted to be the first African-American to face execution at federal level since July 2020. LeCroy was later executed as originally scheduled.

At that time, the escalating rate of executions by the federal government since its resumption was known to be "unprecedented" and attracted much criticism. The upcoming execution of Vialva garnered widespread controversy and gave rise to allegations of racial bias behind his sentencing, given that Vialva was African-American while his victims Todd and Stacie Bagley were white. Contextually, Vialva's execution order was issued at the time when the U.S. was shaken by the recent racial violence against African-Americans, especially the murder of George Floyd and killing of Breonna Taylor by police officers that same year. A report released by non-profit organization Death Penalty Information Center revealed that there was an over-representation of African-Americans on state and federal death rows, and case studies demonstrated that African-Americans who kill white people are far more likely to be sentenced to death than white people whose victims were African-American. It also came to light that out of the 12-member federal jury presiding over Vialva's trial, only one juror was African-American while the remaining 11 members were white.

In a final bid to escape the death penalty, Vialva's defense counsel appealed to both the Court of Appeal (Fifth Circuit) and the U.S. Supreme Court for a stay of execution, after citing that Vialva's trial defense was not adequately raised and mitigating factors of his troubled childhood were not presented before the jury to ensure a fair chance of having his life spared, and they also claimed that Vialva had organic brain injuries and untreated bipolar disorder at the time of the offense. Using scientific research reports as proof, Vialva's lawyers argued that his age of 19 scientifically did not allow him to have sufficient maturity to grasp the grave consequences of his actions and death penalty at the time. It was further revealed that Vialva's former lawyer in 2000 was coincidentally seeking appointment with the judicial office that was prosecuting Vialva at the time, which his counsel claimed was unfair to him. However, the Supreme Court refused to accept Vialva's final appeal and allowed his execution to proceed.

On September 24, 2020, 40-year-old Christopher Vialva was put to death via lethal injection at USP Terre Haute. Vialva, who ordered Pizza Hut as his last meal and converted to Messianic Judaism, expressed remorse and asked God to comfort the families of the couple he killed back in 1999. He also accepted a prayer before he was administered with a single dose of pentobarbital. In response to the execution of Vialva, Todd Bagley's mother stated that she wanted Vialva to face the consequences of his actions, stating he had to pay for taking her son's life.

Two months after he died, Vialva's co-accused Brandon Bernard was also executed by lethal injection on December 10, 2020, despite appeals from former jurors, prosecutors, and media personality Kim Kardashian to grant him clemency. Individually, Bernard's case was also controversial given that compared to Vialva's role as ringleader in the Bagley murders, Bernard's status as a low-level gang member and "murkier" role – mainly the uncertainty of his degree of culpability behind the crime – convinced the stakeholders who advocated against Bernard's execution that he did not deserve execution. It was similarly argued that Bernard, who was also African-American, was being implicated in the alleged racial bias that sent him and Vialva to death row and ultimately ended with execution.

== See also ==
- Brandon Bernard
- Capital punishment by the United States federal government
- List of people executed by the United States federal government
- List of people executed in the United States in 2020

Executions carried out by the United States federal government
Preceded by William LeCroy Jr. September 22, 2020	Christopher Vialva; September 24, 2020	Succeeded by Orlando Hall November 19, 2020
Executions carried out in the United States
Preceded by William LeCroy Jr. – Federal government September 22, 2020	Christopher Vialva – Federal government September 24, 2020	Succeeded by Orlando Hall – Federal government November 19, 2020
