= Brandon Bernard =

American criminal (1980–2020)

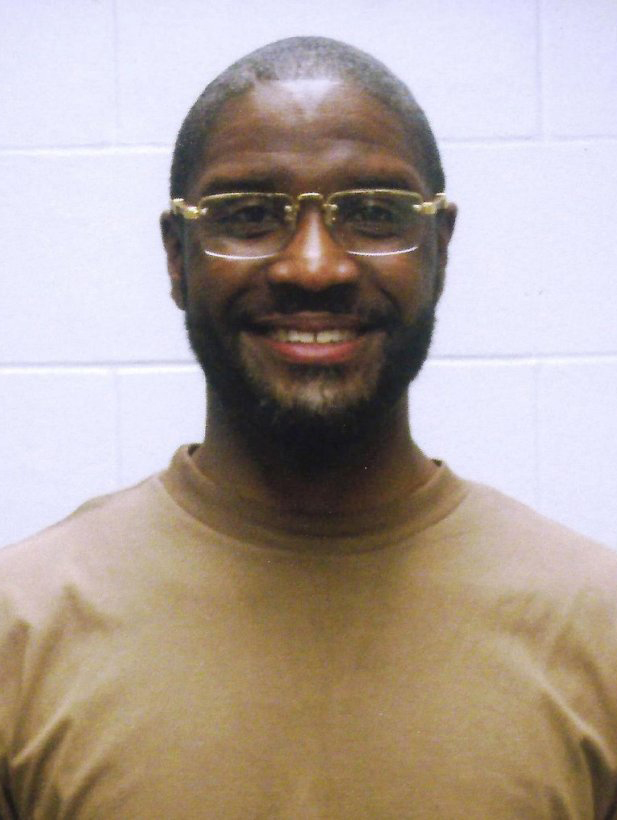
- Born: Brandon Anthony Micah Bernard; July 3, 1980; San Antonio, Texas, U.S.
- Died: December 10, 2020 (aged 40); USP Terre Haute, Indiana, U.S.
- Status: Executed by lethal injection
- Allegiance: 212 Piru Bloods
- Motive: Robbery
- Convictions: First degree murder (2 counts); Conspiracy to commit murder Carjacking resulting in death
- Penalty: Death (June 13, 2000)

Details
- Victims: 2
- Date: June 21, 1999
- Location: Fort Hood, Texas
- Imprisoned at: United States Penitentiary, Terre Haute

Brandon Anthony Micah Bernard (July 3, 1980 – December 10, 2020) was an American man convicted and executed for the 1999 robbery, kidnapping, and murder of Todd Bagley, 26, and Stacie Bagley, 28. He was sentenced to death for the murders and remained on death row until his execution in December 2020. Bernard's conviction and execution attracted controversy due to questions about the extent of his culpability in the murders. In the time leading to his execution, prominent politicians, public figures, and five surviving jurors who convicted him advocated for his sentence to be commuted.

Bernard spent most of his childhood in Killeen, Texas. In his early teens, he began committing crimes such as burglary and joined a neighborhood gang. His crimes and rebellious behaviors led him to being kicked out of several schools and prosecuted in the juvenile criminal justice system. In 1999, Bernard and four teenaged accomplices robbed, kidnapped, and murdered two youth pastors—Todd and Stacie Bagley. After forcing the pastors into the trunk of their car, the ringleader, Christopher Andre Vialva, shot both in the head before Bernard set the car on fire. Todd died instantly from the gunshot, and Stacie's cause of death is disputed.

A last minute request for stay of execution was rejected by the United States Supreme Court, and Bernard was executed hours later on December 10, 2020.

== Early life ==
Brandon Anthony Micah Bernard was born on July 3, 1980, to army nurse Thelma Louise (Johnson) and Kenneth Richmond Bernard in San Antonio, Texas. He had two younger siblings. Because of his mother's transfer to Alaska, the family moved briefly to Fairbanks, Alaska, from 1982 to November 1984, and then moved to Killeen, Texas. He spent the majority of his childhood in Killeen. As a child, Bernard had asthma. In 1986, Bernard attended school at the Seventh-Day Adventist Academy. The family spent the summer of 1987 in Colorado for his mother's medical training. In September 1992, Bernard's intoxicated father sprayed his mother in the face with mace. The couple divorced in 1993.

In 1994, Bernard's cousin, Melsimeon Pollock, joined the household. Pollock and Bernard began burglarizing houses in early 1995. Bernard's rebellious and criminal behavior resulted in him being bounced between his parents' households, multiple different schools, and five months in a juvenile detention facility in Brownwood, Texas, in 1995. Bernard became a member of the organized neighborhood gang known as "212 Piru Bloods". In 1996, Bernard attempted to gain employment, but failed to do so. He completed his GED in 1997, and enrolled as a senior at Killeen High School for the 1997–1998 school year. While attending Killeen High School, he received decent grades and had good attendance. In the summer of 1998, Bernard attempted to join the United States Army, but was rejected because of his juvenile offenses.

== Murders of Todd and Stacie Bagley ==
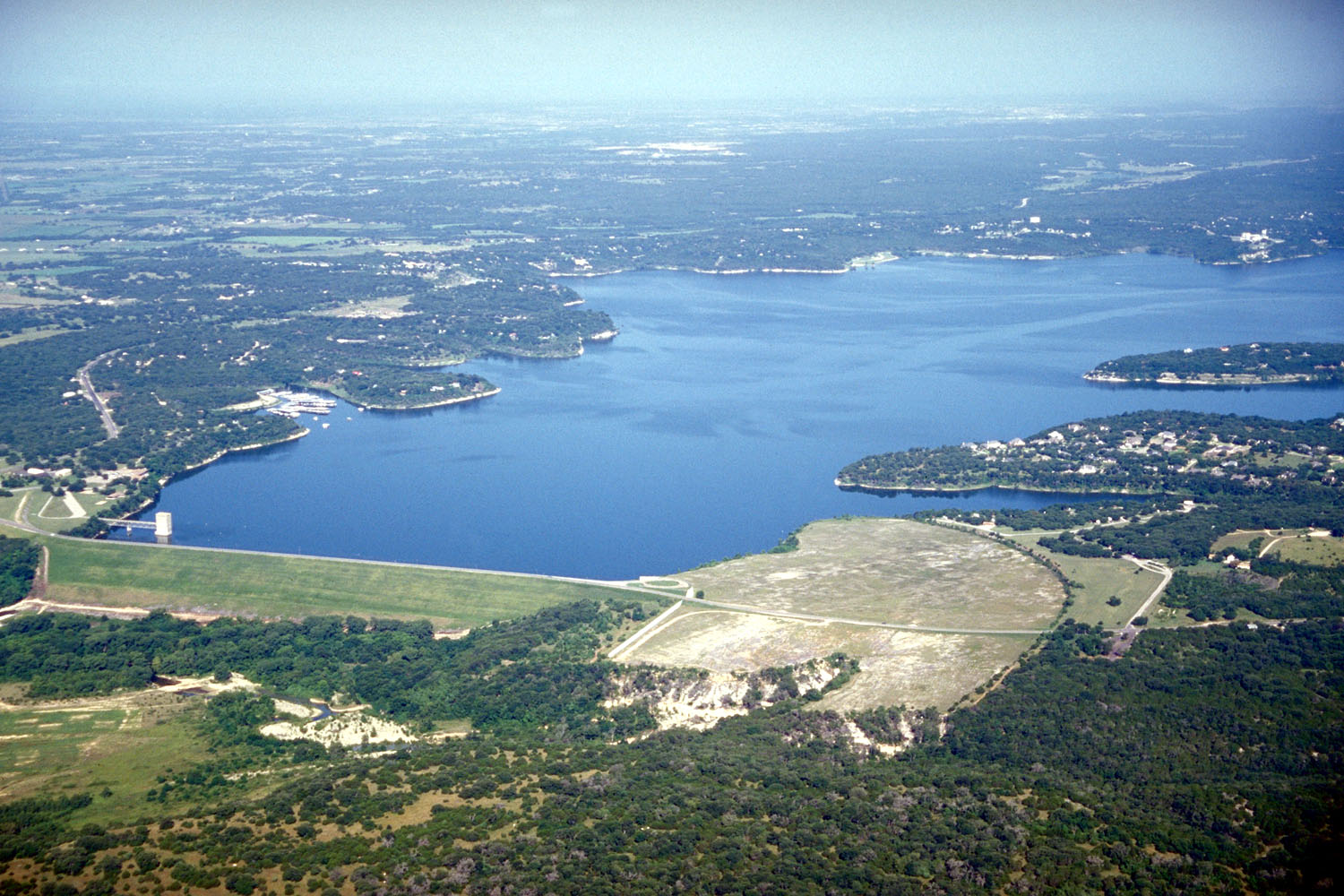
Belton lake recreation area where the murders occurred

On the afternoon of June 21, 1999, Brandon Bernard, 18; Christopher Andre Vialva, 19; Terry Terrell Brown, 17; Christopher Michael Lewis, 17; and Tony Sparks, 16, approached Todd and Stacie Bagley, two youth pastors, and asked them for a ride at a gas station with plans to rob them. Once the Bagleys agreed to give them a ride, Vialva held the couple at gunpoint and forced them into the trunk. While in the trunk for several hours driving around, the Bagleys spoke through an opening in the back seat and urged their abductors to accept Jesus into their hearts and spare their lives. The perpetrators then robbed the Bagleys by using their ATM card to withdraw cash, stealing money, stealing jewelry, and seeking to pawn Stacie's wedding ring. Soon after, the teens pulled to the side of the road at Belton Lake recreation area and poured lighter fluid inside the vehicle while the Bagleys sang "Jesus Loves Me". Vialva then shot both of the Bagleys in the head, killing Todd instantly. Bernard then set the car on fire.

The exact cause of Stacie's death is disputed. An autopsy commissioned by the prosecution at Bernard's trial claimed Stacie died of smoke inhalation as a result of the fire Bernard started. However, the chief medical examiner of Galveston County Stephen Pustilnik came to the conclusion that Stacie was "medically dead" from the gunshot wound to the head before Bernard started the fire.

The perpetrators ran down the hill to get to Bernard's car and tried to drive away, but the car slid off the road and went into a muddy ditch. The perpetrators were trying to get the car out of the ditch as first responders arrived at the scene due to reports of a fire, and they were arrested when firemen found the bodies in the trunk of the burned car.

=== Legal proceedings ===
Bernard's trial was held in 2000, one year after the murders. Since the crimes took place at Fort Hood, the trial was held in federal court instead of state court. He was convicted of carjacking, conspiracy to commit murder, and two counts of first degree murder. He was sentenced to death on June 13, 2000.

Christopher Vialva (May 10, 1980 – September 24, 2020) was convicted of the same charges and sentenced to death as well. He was executed on September 24, 2020. In a video he released shortly before his execution, he expressed remorse and asked for clemency. "I committed a grave wrong when I was a lost kid and took two precious lives from this world," he said. "Every day, I wish I could right this wrong." Vialva's last meal consisted of food from Pizza Hut. His final words were "Father...heal their hearts with grace and love. I'm ready, father."

Brown and Lewis, who both testified against Bernard and Vialva during the trial, both pleaded guilty to second degree murder and each received 248 months in prison. Brown was released from prison on January 6, 2020, and Lewis was released from prison on June 23, 2017.

Another youth, 15-year-old Gregory Hardin Lynch, was prosecuted for providing the handgun which was used to murder the Bagleys. Bernard had loaned the handgun, which belonged to him, to Lynch prior to the murders. Lynch pleaded guilty to conspiracy to possess a stolen firearm and received a five-year sentence. Lynch committed additional crimes in prison, extending his sentence but was eventually released on December 16, 2008.

Sparks was initially sentenced to life without parole, but his sentence was reduced to 420 months followed by five years of supervised release in March 2018, having already served 214 months, due to him being a juvenile at the time. He is scheduled for release on June 8, 2030.

== Execution and controversy ==
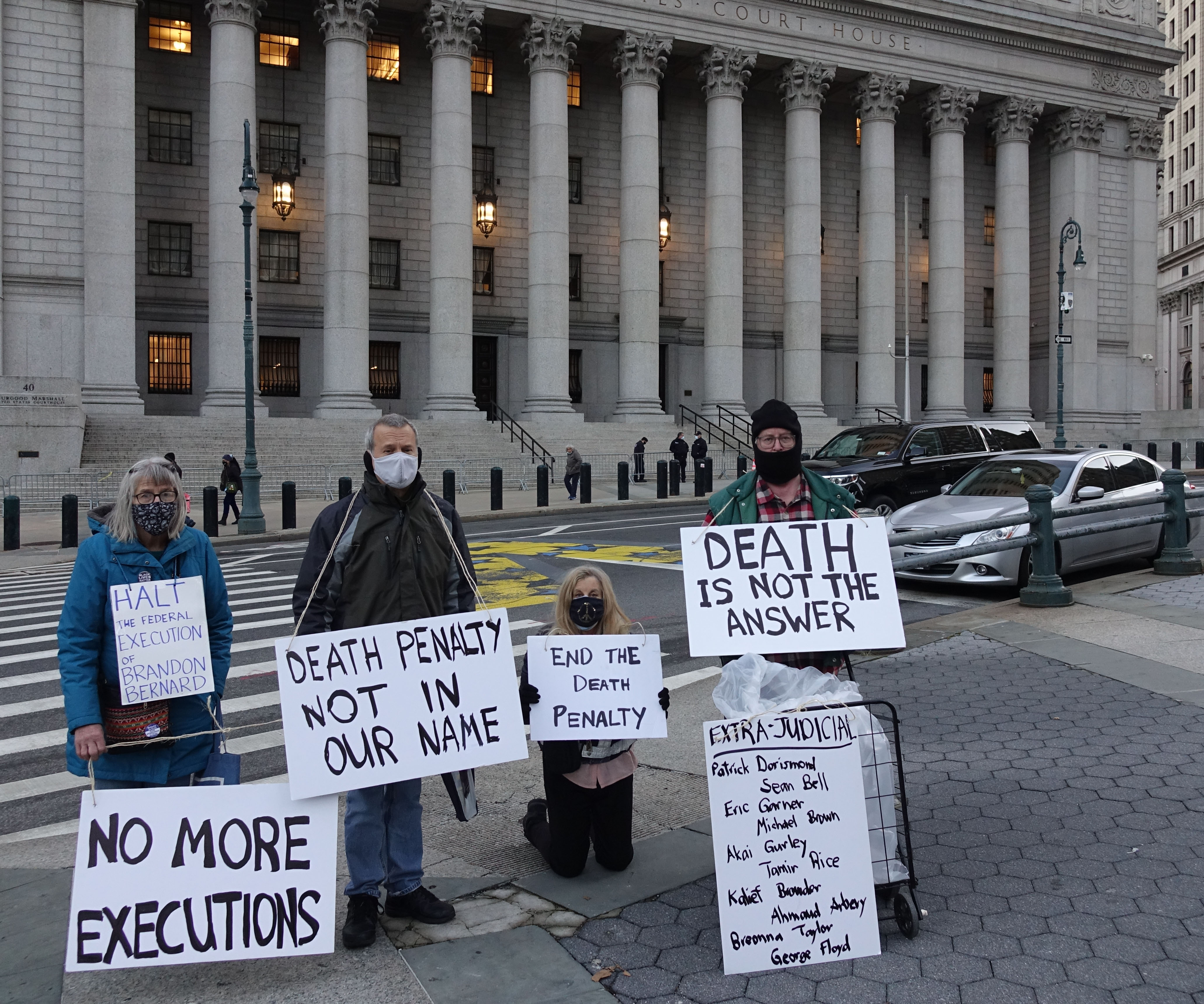
Vigil and protest held against the execution of Bernard

Bernard exhausted his appeals on January 19, 2016, but at the time, the U.S. federal government had a de facto moratorium on capital punishment. Bernard received an execution date after U.S. Attorney General William Barr ordered the resumption of federal executions in 2019.

In the time preceding his execution, controversy arose over whether Bernard should have been sentenced to death and executed, in part because of President Donald Trump's lame-duck status. Bernard's legal team filed appeals on the basis that his prosecutor withheld the information that he was a low-level gang member, making him less likely to be a future offender. This revelation, combined with concerns that Bernard's attorneys did not adequately defend him at trial, convinced five out of the nine living jurors who voted to convict Bernard to advocate for his sentence to be commuted to life in prison.

Former federal prosecutor Angela Moore, who had initially argued for upholding the death sentence on appeal, also pressed for Bernard's sentence to be commuted to life. She cited new studies that suggested 18-year-olds lack an adult's ability to control their impulses, as well as studies that showed black teenagers are "systematically denied the benefit of their youth." She also noted Bernard's exemplary record in prison; in 20 years, he had never been cited for a disciplinary rules violation.

Lawyers Alan Dershowitz and Ken Starr, who represented Trump in the past, requested that the Supreme Court delay the execution by two weeks, but the request was rejected and was only successful in prolonging proceedings for three hours. Justices Stephen Breyer, Elena Kagan, and Sonia Sotomayor dissented from the Court's refusal to stay the execution and rejection of certiorari. The day before Bernard's execution, Dershowitz allegedly asked Trump to commute Bernard's sentence to life imprisonment. Trump apologised but said he had already promised the Bagley family that Bernard would be executed.

Bernard was executed by lethal injection at the United States Penitentiary in Terre Haute, Indiana. His last meal consisted of a meat lover's pizza and a brownie. While preparing for the execution, Bernard spoke his last words, apologizing to the couple in whose murder he was involved, and adding that the words he spoke were "the only words that I can say that completely capture how I feel now and how I felt that day." The chemical used during the lethal injection was pentobarbital. He was pronounced dead at 9:27 p.m. EST on December 10, 2020.

== See also ==
- Dustin Higgs
- Execution of Nathaniel Woods
- Capital punishment by the United States federal government
- List of people executed by the United States federal government
- List of people executed in the United States in 2020

Executions carried out by the United States federal government
Preceded by Orlando Hall November 19, 2020	Brandon Bernard; December 10, 2020	Succeeded by Alfred Bourgeois December 11, 2020
Executions carried out in the United States
Preceded by Orlando Hall – Federal government November 19, 2020	Brandon Bernard – Federal government December 10, 2020	Succeeded by Alfred Bourgeois – Federal government December 11, 2020
