= Lezmond Mitchell =

American murderer (1981–2020)

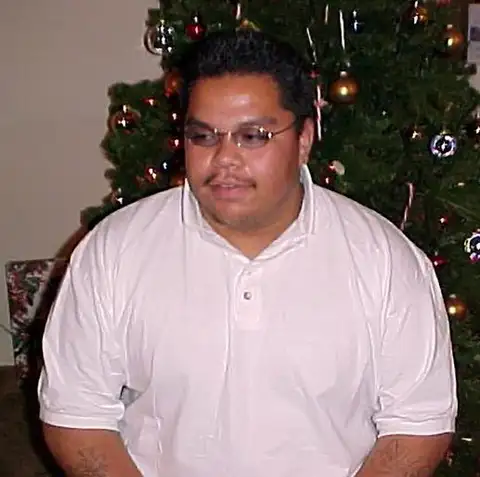
- Born: September 17, 1981; Fort Defiance, Arizona, U.S.
- Died: August 26, 2020 (aged 38); USP Terre Haute, Indiana, U.S.
- Status: Executed by lethal injection
- Motive: robbery, carjacking
- Convictions: First degree murder (2 counts); Carjacking resulting in death Kidnapping resulting in death Use of a firearm during a crime of violence (2 counts)
- Penalty: Death (September 15, 2003)

Details
- Victims: 2
- Date: October 28, 2001
- Country: United States
- State: Arizona
- Date apprehended: November 4, 2001

Lezmond Charles Mitchell (September 17, 1981 – August 26, 2020) was a Native-American criminal who was executed by the United States federal government for the 2001 murders of Alyce Slim and her 9-year-old granddaughter Tiffany Lee in Apache County, Arizona. Mitchell and an accomplice, Johnny Orsinger, killed Slim and Lee through repeated stab wounds and bludgeoning during the course of a carjacking, and since this is qualified as a federal offense, Mitchell was tried and convicted in federal court. His case sparked controversy as the Navajo Nation tribe he was a part of openly opposed the government's plans for his execution, along with Mitchell himself maintaining that he was involved in the murders but was not the mastermind behind them. Mitchell was the only Native American on death row until his execution via lethal injection on August 26, 2020.

== Early life ==
Lezmond Charles Mitchell was born in Fort Defiance, Arizona, on September 17, 1981. Born 1/4 Navajo, 1/4 White, and 1/2 Marshallese, Mitchell was of Native-American heritage. He was an enrolled member of the Navajo Nation.

Mitchell was raised by his grandparents George and Bobbi Jo who were allegedly abusive. In his early years, his grandparents beat him with a variety of objects: a ruler, broom handles, and appliance parts. As a result of the beatings Mitchell developed depression, cognitive disorder, and antisocial personality disorder. This also led to him struggling with his weight and his Native American heritage, as he believed that he was not a "true Navajo." In his 6th grade year, Mitchell was moved to California to live with his mother. She was reportedly controlling and abusive, and asked Mitchell's peers to report back to her on his behavior. She required Mitchell to check in with her every 30 minutes. His mother also mocked his weight and often ranted about wasting money on food for him.

The emotional abuse Mitchell endured led him to start abusing drugs and alcohol. He also ran away from home. At 14 years old Mitchell had his first run in with the law after he vandalized a bathroom wall. He graduated high school as an honors student in 2000.

== Murders ==
In 2001, Mitchell crossed paths with 16-year-old Johnny Theodore Orsinger, a teenager who had been involved in the carjacking and double murder of 47-year-old David Begay and 30-year-old Jasbert Sam on August 28. In October, the two made their own plans for a carjacking and murder. On October 28, 2001, Mitchell and Orsinger were hitchhiking when they were picked up by 63-year-old Alyce Slim and her 9-year-old granddaughter Tiffany Lee, who were fellow Navajo members from Fort Defiance. Slim and Lee were returning home visiting a traditional healer in Tohatchi, New Mexico, for leg pains.

Slim drove Mitchell and Orsinger to their requested location at Sawmill, but when there both attacked and killed Slim, stabbing her 33 times. The duo then kidnapped Lee, forcing her into the backseat with her grandmother's body as they drove the vehicle to the Chuska Mountains, where both men forced Lee to the ground. Mitchell made two attempts to slit Lee's throat, but when she did not immediately die, Mitchell and Orsinger pummeled the girl to death with a 20-pound rock.

Afterwards, Mitchell and Orsinger dismembered the bodies of Slim and Lee, lighting the body parts on fire before burying the remains in a shallow grave. They then stole their vehicle and kept it in their possession. On October 31, three days after the murders, three armed men robbed the Red Rock Trading Post Office while wearing Halloween masks, and used Slim's vehicle as a getaway car. They ended up abandoning the car on November 1 and attempted to light it on fire.

== Legal proceedings ==
As a result of a large investigation, on November 4 and 5, 2001, the Navajo Nation Strategic Reaction Team surrounded the Round Rock residences of Mitchell, Orsinger, 34-year-old Teddy Orsinger, 20-year-old George Nakai, 23-year-old Jimmy Nakai Jr., Danny Leal, and Jason Kinlicheenie on suspicion of being involved in the murders, with most of them being present at the Begay and Sam murders. They were captured, and in November, a federal grand jury indicted Mitchell on 11 counts, including kidnapping, carjacking, robbery and murder.

Since he was being tried federally, prosecutors sought a death sentence. The Navajo Department of Justice openly opposed the prosecutors plans to seek the death penalty in a statement in 2002. Orsinger, since he was juvenile, was ordered to be tried separately. The Orsingers, the Nakais, Leal, and Kinlicheenie were all convicted for their roles in the Begay and Sam murders and sentenced to life in prison. Mitchell's trial began in April 2003, and lasted a month. Mitchell's lawyers maintained that, while their client was present at the time of the killings, he was not the one that perpetrated them, but instead Orsinger was the actual mastermind behind it. On May 8, Mitchell was convicted on all counts and sentenced to death. On September 15, he was formally sentenced to death by Judge Mary H. Murguia. Orsinger was convicted later in December for his role in the Slim and Lee murders and given another life sentence.

Orsinger was later granted a resentencing hearing as a result of the Miller v. Alabama and Montgomery v. Louisiana rulings. However, a federal judge resentenced to life in prison after a hearing.

In 2015, Mitchell argued his case to a three-judge panel. He claimed that his original defense team was ineffective, though the U.S. Court of Appeals for the Ninth Circuit counter-argued that Mitchell's defense had been "thorough in the extreme" and upheld his sentence. During the presidency of Donald Trump, Mitchell was one of several condemned men on federal death row selected to be executed. He was first scheduled to be executed on December 11, 2019, and would have been the first person executed by the federal government since the execution of Louis Jones Jr. in 2003. Mitchell's attorneys in the meantime sought a stay of execution to investigate possible racial bias by the jury who convicted him.

Shortly before the scheduled execution, the U.S. Court of Appeals granted the stay while it resolved an additional appeal. In May 2020, a federal court in Arizona denied Mitchell an opportunity to interview former jurors, and the decision was upheld by the U.S. Court of Appeals.

== Execution ==
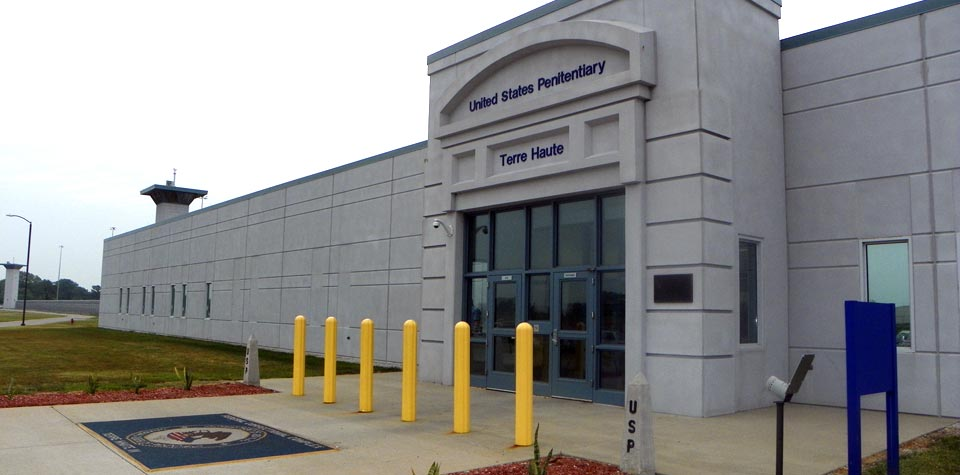
USP Terre Haute, where Mitchell was executed

In July 2020, U.S. attorney general William Barr scheduled Mitchell's execution to occur on August 26. During this time, executions by the federal government started up again, and three inmates were executed that month, with Mitchell scheduled to be the fourth. In early August Mitchell's attorneys sought a delay of execution and argued that it should be performed in Arizona rather than be conducted by the federal government. Judge David Campbell rejected the proposal.

On the day of his execution, numerous protesters stood outside the Federal Correction Complex to protest Mitchell's execution. Mitchell was brought into the execution room in USP Terre Haute at 6:03 pm, where he was strapped to a gurney and injected with a fatal dose of pentobarbital. When asked if he would like to make a final statement he replied "No, I'm good". At 6:29 p.m. he went unresponsive and was declared dead, with the execution officially concluding. Up until his death, Mitchell was the only Native American on federal death row. His body was subsequently cremated and his ashes were given to Navajo Nation tribal members.

According to Christopher Vialva, another federal death row inmate who would be executed 29 days after Mitchell, Mitchell spoke to no one in the week leading up to his execution.

=== Controversies ===
The execution was controversial, as the Navajo Nation tribe he was a part of openly opposed to having Mitchell executed. Mitchell's attorneys attacked the U.S. government's decision to execute him in a public statement and accused them of injustice against Native Americans;

"Mr. Mitchell's execution represents a gross insult to the sovereignty of Navajo Nation, whose leaders had personally called on the President to commute his sentence to life without the possibility of release. The very fact that he faced execution despite the tribe's opposition to a death sentence for him reflected the government's disdain to tribal sovereignty".

They also brought up that, under federal law, Native American tribes can decide whether they want their citizens subjected to the death penalty and Navajo Nation opposed the death penalty; however, since Mitchell was convicted under federal law of carjacking (which is a federal crime no matter who committed it), this made the tribe unable to interfere. The family of Slim and Lee supported the execution and stated it brought them closure. Lee's father, Daniel, said that no matter how much Navajo Nation objects, they do not represent him:

"He took my daughter away, and no remorse or anything like that. The Navajo Nation president, the council, they don't speak for me. I speak for myself and for my daughter."

== See also ==
- Capital punishment by the United States federal government
- List of people executed by the United States federal government
- List of people executed in the United States in 2020

Executions carried out by the United States federal government
Preceded by Dustin Lee Honken July 17, 2020	Lezmond Mitchell; August 26, 2020	Succeeded by Keith Nelson August 28, 2020
Executions carried out in the United States
Preceded by Dustin Lee Honken – Federal government July 17, 2020	Lezmond Mitchell – Federal government August 26, 2020	Succeeded by Keith Nelson – Federal government August 28, 2020
