= Daniel Lewis Lee =

American murderer (1973–2020)

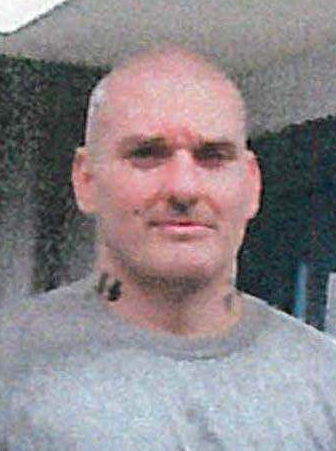
- Lee shortly before his execution in 2020
- Born: January 31, 1973; Yukon, Oklahoma, U.S.
- Died: July 14, 2020 (aged 47); USP Terre Haute, Indiana, U.S.
- Cause of death: Execution by lethal injection
- Other names: Danny Lee; Daniel Lewis Graham; Danny Lee Graham; Daniel Louis Lee
- Motive: To finance the establishment of a white ethnostate
- Convictions: Federal; Murder in aid of racketeering (3 counts); Racketeering; Conspiracy to commit racketeering Oklahoma; Robbery; Florida; Carrying a concealed weapon
- Penalty: Death (May 4, 1999)
- Accomplices: John David Patton (1 murder); Chevie Kehoe (3 murders)

Details
- Victims: 4
- Date: July 24, 1990 (Murder of Joey Wavra); January 11, 1996 (Murder of Mueller family)
- Country: United States
- States: Oklahoma and Arkansas
- Date apprehended: September 24, 1997 (for the final time)

Daniel Lewis Lee (January 31, 1973 – July 14, 2020) was an American white supremacist, neo-Nazi, and murderer. In 1999, Lee was convicted as an accomplice to Chevie Kehoe in the 1996 murders of William Frederick Mueller, Nancy Ann Mueller, and their young daughter Sarah Elizabeth Powell, during a robbery at their Arkansas home. The murders were committed as part of a plot to establish a white ethnostate in the Pacific Northwest, known as the Northwest Territorial Imperative. While Kehoe was found guilty of the triple murder in a separate trial and was sentenced to three consecutive terms of life imprisonment without parole, Lee was sentenced to death. Lee had been previously convicted for assisting his cousin in the 1990 murder of Joey Wavra.

Upon conviction by the US federal government, Lee stayed on death row for 21 years before he was scheduled to be executed on July 13, 2020, but on that date, a U.S. district judge blocked the execution, citing unresolved legal issues. Thereafter, on July 14, the Supreme Court of the United States ruled that the execution could proceed. It was scheduled for 4:00 a.m. that same day. After another short delay, he was executed at 8:07 a.m. He was the first person executed by the US federal government since 2003.

== Early life ==
Lee was born on January 31, 1973, in Yukon, Oklahoma. His biological father, James Gene Lee, had married Lee's mother, Lea Graham, the prior year, but the marriage wasn't legal since James was still married to another woman. James Lee physically abused Lea and abandoned the family after his son's birth. Lea married her second husband, Dennis Graham, in 1976 and during their twelve-year marriage, Dennis beat and sexually abused his wife, sometimes in front of Lee, while doting on his biological daughter. Lee was subjected to emotional and physical abuse by his stepfather, with Lee's mother later alleging that Lee was also molested by him. Lee's court psychiatrist stated that he inherited a predisposition for alcoholism and mental illness.

As a child, Lee reportedly suffered from untreated seizures and was also diagnosed with ADHD. Lee's mother admitted to regularly withholding prescriptions of phenobarbital and ritalin for both conditions since she "didn't like seeing him constantly drugged". At age eleven or fifteen, Lee began huffing spray paint, Scotchgard, and other household chemicals as inhalant drugs, often leading to unconsciousness, as well as consuming downers and smoking marijuana. According to later appeals, he was diagnosed with borderline personality disorder and learning disabilities as an adult.

During the 1980s, Lee's mother regularly alerted authorities to take her son to youth homes, describing him as "unruly and beyond parental control", but he was always returned to his family for disruptive behavior. In 1988, while living in Tennessee, Lee was reported by his mother for assaulting his younger stepsister, who has cerebral palsy. Lee was signed onto two drug rehabilitation programs, but lapsed attendance for both. Due to a suicide attempt and violence against his peers, Lee was briefly held at St. Anthony Hospital in Oklahoma City. By February 1989, the Department of Human Services had taken child custody of Lee.

== Crimes ==
In 1988, Lee, aged 15, first came into contact with law enforcement in Oklahoma County, when he was arrested twice within a week for burglary and arson. Four months after his first arrest, Lee was charged with three counts of second-degree burglary and threatening a witness.

In early 1989, Lee was dismissed from a mental hospital in Miami, Oklahoma, with staff citing Lee's repeated harassment, intimidation, and physical assaults on other patients. In spring and summer 1989, Lee escaped twice from custody, being relocated each time after several months beyond state lines, in Kentucky and Arkansas respectively. While in hiding, Lee began associating with the Ku Klux Klan, reportedly after "finding a father figure" in a senior KKK member, Bobby Norman. Police also suspected Lee of committing a series of armed robberies while on the run, but he was ultimately not charged.

In August 1989, Lee was held at Central Oklahoma Juvenile Center in Tecumseh, from which he escaped a week after arrival. Upon his recapture in October 1989, Lee voiced a desire to attain a GED and attend treatment for his drug addiction. By 1990, Lee had obtained work at a fast-food restaurant and received a 30-day pass.

=== Murder of Joey Wavra ===
On July 24, 1990, in Oklahoma City, Lee got into an altercation with another man, 22-year-old Joseph "Joey" Wavra III, at a party. Wavra was accused of urinating on a recliner by accident after being intimidated by other guests. Lee struck Wavra in the face and kicked him on the floor once he had collapsed before handcuffing Wavra. Lee, accompanied by his cousin, 20-year-old John David Patton, then left the party with Wavra. Party guests recalled Patton threatening to kill Wavra and asking others for their opinion. Lee and Patton forced Wavra to a storm drain in the backyard of another residence. It was Lee's idea to wedge Wavra, described as thin and weighing 110 pounds, into the narrow space. Patton ordered Wavra to strip naked, with Lee taking Wavra's clothes and packing them in a bag for disposal. During this process, Wavra pleaded with Lee and Patton, saying "Don't make me go down there". Lee then handed Patton a rope, a garbage bag and a paring knife, before leaving to get rid of Wavra's clothes. During this time, Patton used the knife to slit Wavra's throat before stabbing him numerous time in the chest and foot soles. Patton subsequently returned to the party, telling attendants, including Lee, "It's cool, Joey's OK". All three individuals were under the influence of alcohol and LSD.

The following day, Patton confessed the murder to the homeowner, Larry Paul Dawson, who had spent the night of the crime in jail for public drunkenness and discovered the body upon his release. Lee was charged in the murder after testifying against Patton and held without bond. Lee had claimed that he wasn't aware of Patton's intention with the knife, believing he would use it to cut off Wavra's pants and that he did not witness the murder. During Lee's trial, his attorney, as well as his mother asked for Lee to be tried by a juvenile court. On December 2, 1990, Lee pleaded guilty to robbery, whereupon the murder charge was dismissed. He received a five-year suspended sentence for his involvement in the crime, while Patton was sentenced to life without parole. Patton died in prison on January 7, 2014.

Between 1991 and 1995, Lee was charged with reckless driving, larceny, battery, failure to appear in court, assault with a dangerous weapon, resisting arrest, and trespassing in Oklahoma, Tennessee, Washington, Wyoming, and Florida.

In early 1995, Lee was arrested for assaulting his girlfriend Jennifer Givens while living in Bowling Green, Kentucky, after Givens tore up a picture of Adolf Hitler she found in Lee's belongings. Givens later stated that Lee was physically abusive throughout their relationship, including while she was pregnant with their daughter.

Lee met white supremacist Chevie Kehoe in 1995 and was recruited into a white supremacist organization known as the Aryan Peoples' Republic or the Aryan Peoples' Resistance (APR). On May 3, 1995, Lee was convicted of carrying a concealed weapon in Martin County, Florida, and was sentenced to six months probation.

Lee lost his left eye sometime before April 1996 when he was hit by a cue ball in a bar fight in Spokane, Washington, after he called a Native American a racial slur. He refused to wear an eyepatch and among his neo-Nazi skinhead friends gained the nickname Cyclops.

=== Mueller family murders ===
In January 1996, Lee and Kehoe left the state of Washington and traveled to Arkansas. On January 11, 1996, they arrived at the home of 52-year-old William Frederick Mueller, a gun dealer who lived near Tilly, Arkansas, who possessed a large collection of weapons, ammunition, and cash. Kehoe and his father had robbed Mueller in February 1995, and Kehoe expected to find valuable property at the house. Dressed in police raid clothing, Lee and Kehoe tried to enter Mueller's home, but the family was not in. When they returned, Lee and Kehoe overpowered and incapacitated Mueller and his wife, 28-year-old Nancy Ann Mueller (née Branch). They then questioned Nancy Mueller's 8-year-old daughter, Sarah Elizabeth Powell, about where they could find the cash, guns, and ammunition, forcing her to talk by shocking her with an electric cattle prod.

After finding $50,000 in cash and gold (equivalent to $102,642 in 2025), and $30,000 worth of firearms and firearm parts, Lee and Kehoe shot each of the three victims with a stun gun. They then placed plastic bags over their heads and sealed the bags with duct tape, suffocating them. According to Chevie Kehoe's mother Gloria, Lee confessed to participating in the murder of the Mueller parents, but insisted that Powell was killed by Kehoe after Lee refused. They took the victims in Kehoe's vehicle to the Illinois River, 45 miles (72 km) away, where they taped rocks to them and threw each family member into the swamp. Lee received $3,000 or $4,000 and a pistol for his part in the crime. Kehoe and his family took the stolen property to a motel in Spokane, Washington, by way of the Christian Identity community of Elohim City, Oklahoma. The bodies were discovered in Lake Dardanelle near Russellville, Arkansas, in late June 1996.

=== Spokane City Hall bombing ===
On April 29, 1996, Lee transported and placed a pipe bomb filled with nails made by Kehoe at the historic city hall of Spokane, Washington. The blast broke a window and spread shrapnel up to two blocks away. As the explosion occurred at around 3:00 a.m., the bomb did not hurt or kill anyone. The bombing was connected to two earlier bombs, detonated as part of a bank robbery in front a U.S. Bank and The Spokesman-Review newspaper office in Spokane Valley on April 1. Federal authorities also investigated potential ties to the nearby murder trial of a Hells Angels member and an upcoming Lilac Bloomsday Run celebration, which was set to take place at Riverfront Park, located directly next to the city hall. Kehoe's brother, Cheyne, told police of Kehoe's involvement in 1998, and that the city hall bombing was intended to "start upheaval in American society" to ease along the establishment of their white ethnostate.

=== Arrest ===
On June 17, 1997, Kehoe was arrested in Cedar City, Utah. Lee had returned to Oklahoma, spending a month working for a family friend in El Reno. Federal agencies surveilled him for several weeks before a taskforce of FBI, ATF, and Pope County Sheriff's Office arrested Lee on September 24, 1997, while at his mother's house in Yukon. Lee was extradited to Pope County, Arkansas, where he was recorded for assaulting other inmates. In February 1998, he was reported for trying to convince a fellow inmate to aid in an escape attempt by smuggling a gun into prison, using a hollowed-out radio later found in Lee's cell. On February 23 of the same year, Lee allegedly threatened Pulaski County sheriff's deputy Nancy Cummings after she denied him access to a phone, insulting her and saying Cummings was "going to die like the others" and that he would "blow [her] head off".

== Sentencing ==
Lee had his hearing for murder on October 31, 1997. He was indicted on December 12, 1997, and arraigned on January 5, 1998. A joint trial of Kehoe and Lee began in November 1998. The Mueller family murders were a federal crime since they had been committed to support a racketeering enterprise. Prosecutors sought death sentences for both Kehoe and Lee.

When Kehoe was sentenced to life imprisonment, federal prosecutors initially planned to pursue a similar sentence of life imprisonment for accomplice Daniel Lewis Lee, but were directed by the United States Department of Justice in Washington, D.C., to argue for a death sentence. U.S. Attorney Paula Casey requested U.S. Attorney General Janet Reno withdraw jeopardy of capital punishment but was told by Deputy U.S. Attorney General Eric Holder to continue seeking a death sentence. On May 4, 1999, Lee was convicted of three counts of murder in aid of racketeering. On May 14, 1999, a jury decided in favor of the death sentence for Lee, after the prosecution pointed to his history of violence and previous convictions as evidence that he would be pose a future danger to society, even in prison. Federal prosecutors presented evidence that Lee had assaulted his mother, sister, and pregnant girlfriend. Lee's staunchest supporter during his 1999 murder trial was his mother. However, on the witness stand, she was forced to admit to having filed petitions against her son for attacking the family.

== Death row ==
In December 1999, the United States Court of Appeals for the Eighth Circuit issued a writ of mandamus quashing Lee's subpoenas of Reno and Holder regarding the sentencing decision. In March 2000, District Judge Garnett Thomas Eisele granted Lee's motion for a new penalty phase trial if the Attorney General herself decided not to withdraw the death penalty. In December 2001, that judgment was reversed by the Eighth Circuit, which reinstated Lee's death sentence. In July 2004, the Eighth Circuit affirmed Lee's conviction and death sentence on the merits.

In April 2013, the Eighth Circuit affirmed the denial of Lee's habeas corpus petition challenging the constitutionality of his conviction. In July 2015, the Eighth Circuit affirmed the denial of Lee's subsequent habeas motion challenging the constitutionality of his prior habeas motion. Lee exhausted his appeals on April 17, 2017, but at the time, the U.S. federal government had a de-facto moratorium on capital punishment. He received an execution date after U.S. Attorney General William Barr ordered the resumption of federal executions in 2019.

Lee was scheduled to be executed on December 9, 2019, and would have been the first inmate to be executed by the federal government since the execution of Louis Jones Jr. in 2003. On November 20, 2019, U.S. District Judge Tanya Chutkan issued a preliminary injunction preventing the resumption of federal executions. Lee and the other three plaintiffs in the case argued that the use of pentobarbital may violate the Federal Death Penalty Act of 1994.

On December 5, 2019, an Indiana federal court stayed Lee's execution, but the United States Court of Appeals for the Seventh Circuit vacated the Indiana federal court's stay of execution on December 6, 2019. Later that same day, the Supreme Court of the United States denied a stay of Chutkan's injunction against all federal executions while the U.S. Court of Appeals reviews Chutkan's decision.

In April 2020, a panel of the United States Court of Appeals for the District of Columbia Circuit vacated District Judge Chutkan's injunction in a per curiam decision. Circuit Judges Gregory G. Katsas and Neomi Rao both wrote concurring opinions concluding that Lee may be executed, but for different reasons. Circuit Judge David S. Tatel dissented, arguing that the statute explicitly requires the federal government to follow state execution protocols. On June 29, 2020, the Supreme Court denied Lee's petition for a writ of certiorari, with Justices Ruth Bader Ginsburg and Sonia Sotomayor dissenting.

The mother of Nancy Mueller, Earlene Branch Peterson, pleaded for clemency on behalf of Lee. She stated, "I can't see how executing Daniel Lee will honor my daughter in any way. In fact, it's kinda like it dirties her name. Because she wouldn't want it and I don't want it."

== Execution ==
The execution date was set for July 13, 2020, the first of several federal executions scheduled after the D.C. Circuit's ruling. The victims' families asked for a rescheduling of the date, saying they were unable to travel to witness the execution due to the COVID-19 pandemic in the United States, but the Seventh Circuit ruled that while allowing the victims' families to attend such events is standard practice, there are no rights or legal basis for their attendance, and denied a change in date. The victims' families sent an emergency appeal to the Supreme Court. Before the Supreme Court could rule, Judge Chutkan ordered a halt to all federal executions on the basis that the process was "very likely to cause extreme pain and needless suffering". The Department of Justice appealed to both the Court of Appeals for the D.C. Circuit and the Supreme Court. The D.C. Circuit Court did not intervene. In the early morning of July 14, 2020, the Supreme Court lifted the hold that Judge Chutkan previously implemented in a 5–4 decision. This action allowed the Department of Justice to proceed with the execution; Lee's lawyers said that the execution could not go forward after midnight under federal regulations.

Lee was executed later that morning. When asked for a final statement, he denied committing the crime, stating, "I didn't do it. I've made a lot of mistakes in my life, but I'm not a murderer. You're killing an innocent man", and that he and Kehoe had been in a different part of the country when the crime occurred. Lee was pronounced dead at 8:07 a.m. after receiving a single-dose lethal injection of pentobarbital.

Lee was the first person to be executed by the United States federal government since the execution of Louis Jones Jr. in 2003. Overall, his execution was the fourth federal execution since legislation permitting the resumption of the practice was passed in 1988.

== Media ==
The Discovery Channel's docudrama series The FBI Files reenacts the behavior of Kehoe and Lee while also showing the forensic science used by the FBI to arrest them in season 2, episode 16, "Deadly Mission", originally aired: 2000.

== See also ==
- Capital punishment by the United States federal government
- List of people executed by the United States federal government
- List of people executed in the United States in 2020

Executions carried out by the United States federal government
Preceded by Louis Jones Jr. March 18, 2003	Daniel Lewis Lee; July 14, 2020	Succeeded by Wesley Ira Purkey July 16, 2020
Executions carried out in the United States
Preceded by Billy Joe Wardlow – Texas July 8, 2020	Daniel Lewis Lee – Federal government July 14, 2020	Succeeded by Wesley Ira Purkey – Federal government July 16, 2020
