= Wesley Ira Purkey =

American murderer (1952–2020)

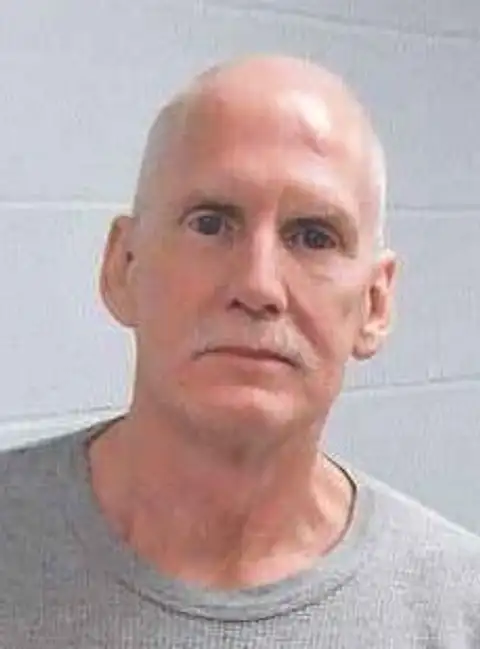
- Purkey shortly before his execution
- Born: January 6, 1952; Wichita, Kansas, U.S.
- Died: July 16, 2020 (aged 68); USP Terre Haute, Indiana, U.S.
- Other name: The Claw Hammer Killer
- Status: Executed by lethal injection
- Convictions: Federal; Kidnapping a child resulting in death Kansas; Felony first degree murder Aggravated robbery (3 counts); Aggravated battery Aggravated escape from custody Kidnapping; Robbery (2 counts); Burglary (2 counts); Unlawful possession of firearms (2 counts); Theft
- Penalty: Federal; Death (January 23, 2004); Kansas; Life imprisonment with possibility of parole after 32 years (April 28, 2000)

Details
- Victims: 2
- Date: January 22, 1998; October 27, 1998
- Country: United States
- States: Kansas and Missouri (one of the victims was kidnapped from Missouri, but murdered in Kansas)
- Date apprehended: October 30, 1998

Wesley Ira Purkey (January 6, 1952 – July 16, 2020) was an American convicted murderer who was executed by the United States federal government for the January 1998 kidnapping, rape, and murder of 16-year-old Jennifer Long. Purkey confessed to the crime while serving a life sentence for the murder of 80-year-old Mary Ruth Bales, whom he beat to death with a claw hammer in October 1998.

In 2020, Purkey was one of several condemned men on federal death row selected to be executed by the federal government of the United States. He was executed via lethal injection on the morning of July 16, 2020, following a delay due to concerns that he had Alzheimer's disease and did not understand why he was being executed.

== Early life ==
Wesley Ira Purkey was born on January 6, 1952, in Wichita, Kansas. As a child, he experienced repeated sexual abuse and molestation by those in charge of his care. At age 14, he was examined for possible brain damage. He reportedly had multiple traumatic brain injuries throughout his life, which began in 1968 at the age of 16 and again in 1972 and 1976, at the ages of 20 and 24, respectively. At age 18, he was diagnosed with schizophrenia and schizoaffective disorder, as well as depression superimposed upon a preexisting antisocial personality disorder.

== Criminal history ==
Purkey was convicted of burglary in 1970, for which he received his first parole. However, he broke his parole and was sent back to prison. He was paroled again in 1980. Following his release on parole, Purkey, accompanied by a friend, robbed a man in Wichita at gunpoint. Purkey then shot the man twice in the head before fleeing. The man survived the shooting, and Purkey was sentenced to fifteen years to life in prison for aggravated battery, aggravated kidnapping, and aggravated robbery. While in prison, records show he was violent and uncooperative. He was stabbed on two separate occasions by other inmates, one of which was over a drug deal.

In 1986, Purkey was reported to have changed and was staying out of trouble and working in a prison paint shop. He earned an associate degree in literature from a community college, joined Alcoholics Anonymous, and took drug, alcohol, and mental health counseling. In 1992, counselors evaluated Purkey and found he was a classic psychopath; however, his education and intelligence seemed to moderate his antisocial tendencies. In 1996, a counselor concluded he had used his time in prison productively to help rebuild his life. The following year, Purkey's family and friends sent letters to the Kansas Parole Board asking for his release, arguing he had matured and was ready for freedom. Police, prosecutors, and Purkey's former victims objected to his release. The 1980 shooting victim, who was now partially disabled for life, told the parole board that Purkey should stay in prison for the remainder of his life. However, the board disagreed, citing that he had made good progress while incarcerated. In March 1997, Purkey was released from prison after serving seventeen years behind bars.

== Murders ==
=== Jennifer Long ===
On January 22, 1998, Purkey drove from his home in Lansing, Kansas, to Kansas City, Missouri for a job interview with a plumbing company. Following the interview, Purkey smoked crack cocaine and prowled the streets in his white Ford pickup truck. On one street, he spotted 16-year-old Jennifer Long walking along the sidewalk. He pulled over and began speaking with her, asking if she wanted to party. She agreed and got into his vehicle, with the two of them driving to a liquor store to purchase alcohol. After Purkey bought Long some gin, he told her he needed to return home. Not wanting to go with him, Long asked to be let out of the vehicle, causing Purkey to retrieve a boning knife from the glove compartment, which he threatened her with. The two drove back to Purkey's home from Missouri to Kansas. Once inside, Purkey took Long to the basement, forced her to undress, then raped her. After doing so, Long attempted to escape. Purkey grabbed her and stabbed her repeatedly in the chest, face, and neck until she died.

After murdering Long, Purkey stuffed her body into a toolbox and then went to a local bar where he spent hours drinking alcohol. Before heading back home, he purchased an electric chainsaw. Over the next few days, he used the chainsaw to dismember Long's body. He divided her body parts into bags and then began burning them one by one in a fireplace. The bones, however, did not burn completely, so Purkey crushed them with his hands. After burning everything, he took the leftover remains and ashes from the fireplace and dumped them in a septic pond in Clearwater, Kansas. He then had his stepchildren help him clean up the basement with bleach. Long's mother called police, friends, and family when Long did not return home, but no one had any information to her whereabouts. The police eventually listed her as a runaway, but the family was never convinced of this. They put up flyers and posters, but no leads came.

=== Mary Ruth Bales ===
On October 26, 1998, Purkey, who was now working as a plumber, was called to the home of 80-year-old Mary Ruth Bales, a widow who had survived polio and walked with a cane. The job was to fix a kitchen faucet at her home in Kansas City, Kansas. Purkey spoke with Bales and offered to do the job if she paid him immediately. She agreed and handed him some cash. Purkey left and used the money to hire a prostitute and purchase several rocks of crack cocaine. He and the prostitute went to a motel where they had sex and smoked for several hours. The following morning, the two of them drove to Bales' home. Purkey entered the house with a toolbox from his company van. He then attacked Bales and bludgeoned her to death with a claw hammer in her bedroom. Her cause of death was later determined to be blunt force trauma resulting from several strikes to her skull. After beating Bales to death, Purkey and the prostitute remained at the house for several hours, where they smoked more crack cocaine and ate food from the fridge.

The following day, he returned to the home equipped with gasoline, intending to burn the house down to cover up the crime. Suspicious neighbors spotted him and alerted the police; however, Purkey fled the area before the police arrived. Upon arrival, police entered the home and found the body of Bales. Neighbors reported seeing the plumbing company van outside the house, and police could piece together what had happened. On October 29, Purkey was identified as a suspect and was charged with first-degree murder. He was captured the following morning as he left a house in Leavenworth.

The company which Purkey worked for, Reddi Root'r, later agreed to pay Bales' family $500,000 to settle a negligence lawsuit over their failure to perform a background check on him.

== Trial and revelation ==
On December 15, 1998, while awaiting trial for the murder of Bales, Purkey sent a letter to KCK Detective Bill Howard, saying he wanted to talk about an unsolved kidnapping and murder which had occurred earlier in the year. Purkey asked Howard to bring an FBI agent with him. He said he was facing a life sentence in state prison for the murder of Bales, and wanted to be convicted of a federal crime so he could serve his time in a federal prison. Purkey had made enemies in the Kansas prison system, and overall believed that life in a federal penitentiary would be more comfortable than in a state prison.

Detective Howard asked FBI Agent Dirk Tarpley to join him in meeting Purkey. The three men met the next day. At the start of the meeting, Purkey said he was planning to plead guilty to murdering Bales, but was willing to admit to a second murder if he was given a life sentence in federal prison. The two officers told Purkey they would give whatever information he revealed to the U.S. Attorney General, but could not make any other promises. Purkey then gave an account of how he kidnapped a female victim (initially, he did not reveal Long's name), took her across state lines from Missouri to his home in Kansas, and then raped and murdered her. Purkey refused to give up any more details unless he was assured that the case would be federally prosecuted.

The two officers met with Kurt Shernuk, an Assistant U.S. Attorney General for the District of Kansas. Given Purkey's motivations, Shernuk was skeptical of his confession, but said a federal prosecution was possible if Purkey cooperated further and gave more evidence, including a body, to corroborate his confession.

Over the next few days, Purkey gave a handwritten and oral confession and led Tarpley and Howard to the crime scene and the septic pond where he disposed of Long's remains. He said that due to the measures he had taken to dispose of the body, the victim's remains were not recoverable. When the officers showed Purkey a line-up of missing people, he quickly identified Long. Throughout this entire process, the question of sentencing was never raised by anyone, including Purkey, who assumed he would receive a life sentence.

In March 2000, Purkey pleaded guilty to felony first degree murder and aggravated robbery for killing Bales in Wyandotte County District Court. On April 28, 2000, he was sentenced to life in prison with no chance of parole for 32 years. During his sentencing hearing, Purkey said he was high on cocaine at the time of the murder and apologized, saying "Words cannot express my remorse for this hideous and senseless murder." Bales' grandson, Lonnie Bales, called Purkey's statement a "sob story" and said he blamed everyone but himself.

On October 10, 2001, federal prosecutors charged Purkey with kidnapping a child resulting in death for Long's murder. Because Purkey's confession had no stipulations regarding sentencing, they announced they would pursue a death sentence. Upon learning that he faced possible execution, Purkey tried to retract his confession but was unsuccessful.

Purkey's trial started in October 2003. He admitted to killing Long but denied kidnapping her. He claimed she was a sex worker who voluntarily traveled with him to Kansas and that he lied about the kidnapping aspect of the murder to ensure a federal prosecution. On November 5, 2003, the jury found Purkey guilty of kidnapping a child resulting in death. During his sentencing hearing, the government produced several witnesses who attested to Purkey's lengthy history of violence. One man said Purkey had raped him at knifepoint in a prison kitchen. A prison gang expert noted that Purkey had "Aryan Pride", a swastika, and Ku Klux Klan tattoos, indicating his involvement in the Aryan Brotherhood. After deliberating for 10 hours, they recommended a death sentence. Purkey was formally sentenced to death on January 23, 2004. He was transferred to the United States Penitentiary in Terre Haute, Indiana and was placed on federal death row.

== Execution ==
Purkey exhausted his appeals on October 14, 2014, but at the time, the U.S. federal government had a de-facto moratorium on capital punishment. In July 2019, the United States federal government announced that federal executions would return after a nearly two-decade gap since the previous execution of Louis Jones Jr. in 2003. Purkey was one of five condemned men on federal death row selected to be executed, with his execution scheduled for December 13, 2019. On November 20, 2019, U.S. District Judge Tanya Chutkan issued a preliminary injunction preventing the resumption of federal executions. Purkey and the other three plaintiffs in the case argued that the use of pentobarbital might violate the Federal Death Penalty Act of 1994. In April 2020, a panel of the United States Court of Appeals for the District of Columbia Circuit vacated District Judge Chutkan's injunction in a per curiam decision.

The execution date for Purkey was rescheduled for July 15, 2020. However, on that same morning, a judge halted the execution due to claims Purkey had dementia. The justice department filed an immediate appeal to the Supreme Court of the United States. Purkey's lawyers argued he had Alzheimer's disease and was not mentally fit enough to be executed.

In the early hours of July 16, the Supreme Court of the United States ruled in a 5–4 decision that the federal government could proceed with executing Purkey and cleared the way for the execution to take place. Hours later, Purkey was executed via lethal injection at USP Terre Haute. In his final statement he apologized to both Long's family and his own. He was pronounced dead at 8:19 a.m.

=== Autopsy ===
Following Purkey's execution, an autopsy was carried out, which was authorized by Purkey's next-of-kin. It was conducted by forensic pathologist Dr. Joyce L. deJong at Western Michigan University. DeJong found that Purkey had had a "severe bilateral acute pulmonary edema" during the execution. Dr. Gail Van Norman, who reviewed the autopsy, stated Purkey experienced "flash pulmonary edema," a condition that can only occur when a person is still alive. According to Van Norman, the results affirmed the opinion that premortem flash pulmonary edema is a virtual medical certainty in any execution carried out by the federal government of the United States using pentobarbital. Van Norman said that any prisoner executed in this manner would experience a sensation of near-drowning or suffocation. She stated, "these are among the most excruciating feelings known to man." Any prisoner executed under the same method as Purkey would supposedly experience extreme pain and suffering.

DeJong's autopsy showed evidence that fluid had built up in Purkey's lungs and spilled into his airways up to his trachea, which would cause a near-drowning sensation during the execution. The autopsy results also showed that Purkey's lungs had increased in weight due to the fluid build-up. Federal prosecutors responded to the claims by saying that the execution was humane and that there were no pentobarbital-related complications.

== See also ==
- Capital punishment by the United States federal government
- List of people executed by the United States federal government
- List of people executed in the United States in 2020

Executions carried out by the United States federal government
Preceded by Daniel Lewis Lee July 14, 2020	Wesley Ira Purkey; July 16, 2020	Succeeded by Dustin Lee Honken July 17, 2020
Executions carried out in the United States
Preceded by Daniel Lewis Lee – Federal government July 14, 2020	Wesley Ira Purkey – Federal government July 16, 2020	Succeeded by Dustin Lee Honken – Federal government July 17, 2020
