= 1993 Iowa murders =

American mass murder case

Dustin Honken
- Honken leaving a federal courthouse after being sentenced to death in 2005
- Born: March 22, 1968; Britt, Iowa, U.S.
- Died: July 17, 2020 (aged 52); USP Terre Haute, Indiana, U.S.
- Cause of death: Execution by lethal injection
- Motive: Witness elimination
- Convictions: Murder in furtherance of a continuing criminal enterprise (5 counts); Conspiracy to commit murder in furtherance of a continuing criminal enterprise (5 counts); Soliciting the murder of a witness Conspiracy to tamper with witnesses and to solicit the murder of witnesses Witness tampering resulting in death (5 counts); Attempting to manufacture methamphetamine Conspiracy to manufacture and distribute methamphetamine
- Penalty: Death (October 11, 2005)

Details
- Victims: 5
- Span of crimes: July 24 – November 5, 1993
- Country: United States
- State: Iowa
- Date apprehended: October 2000 (for the murders)

Angela Johnson
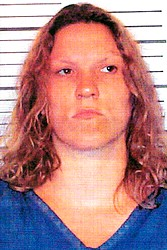
- Mugshot from U.S. Attorney's office
- Born: January 17, 1964 (age 62); Forest City, Iowa, U.S.
- Status: Incarcerated
- Motive: Witness elimination
- Conviction: Murder in furtherance of a continuing criminal enterprise (5 counts)
- Penalty: Death; commuted to life imprisonment (December 17, 2014)

Details
- Victims: 5 (as an accomplice)
- Span of crimes: July 24 – November 5, 1993
- Country: United States
- State: Iowa
- Date apprehended: 2000
- Imprisoned at: Federal Correctional Institution, Aliceville

Dustin Lee Honken (March 22, 1968 – July 17, 2020) and Angela Jane Johnson (born January 17, 1964) are American mass murderers convicted of the 1993 murders of five people in Cerro Gordo County, Iowa, United States

The victims were related to a drug trial against Honken. Honken was involved in the manufacturing of methamphetamine, and one of his dealers was set to testify against him, so he and Johnson, who was his girlfriend, murdered him along with his girlfriend and her two young daughters, on July 25. A few months later, the fifth victim, also a former dealer, was murdered on November 4. The killings all occurred in unincorporated woodland outside of Mason City.

Although Iowa abolished capital punishment in 1965, the crime was a federal case since it involved a continuing criminal enterprise. Honken was sentenced to death and executed by the federal government on July 17, 2020, the first defendant from Iowa to be executed since 1963. Johnson was also sentenced to death, the first woman sentenced to death by a United States federal jury since the 1950s, but the sentence was overturned in 2012, and she was resentenced to life without parole in 2014.

== Background ==
=== Dustin Honken ===
Honken grew up in Britt, Iowa. His father, Jim Honken, was an alcoholic schemer who was allegedly neglectful. Honken reported in his pre-sentence investigation that his father struck him numerous times during his childhood, although he denied that his father was physically abusive and maintained that the emotional turmoil in his early life mostly stemmed from his father's alcoholism. Jim once convinced his son to steal and copy a key to a bank. Jim committed two bank robberies before getting caught and sent to federal prison. Honken's parents divorced when he was nine. Honken had a healthy relationship with his stepfather.

Honken had a healthy relationship with his mother, whom he described as perfect. Federal court appeals later described their relationship while dismissing claims that there was substantial mitigation in his upbringing:

The movant's mother provided a stable, nurturing and loving environment, never abandoned him, did not fail to provide any sort of safe space or comfort to him, never neglected him, never failed to calm him or tell him that things were going to be okay, acted as a loving caretaker and facilitated the movant's attachment to her by making herself available to him.

Honken, who was proficient in math, science, and writing, earned a scholarship to North Iowa Area Community College in 1991. He later said that he had initially planned to become a pharmaceutical lawyer.

During Honken's murder trial, his mitigation expert, Lisa Rickert, wrote to his lawyers that she had struggled to find virtually anything sympathetic about Honken. To the contrary, what she had discovered only cast him in a far more negative light. The defense did not have Rickert take the stand out of the fear that Honken would be deemed a sociopath or be diagnosed with narcissistic personality disorder.

Rickert had discovered that Honken was a white supremacist who had physically and verbally abused his sister, Alyssa. He'd once held a pillow over her face after she told one of his girlfriends that he had other girlfriends. Alyssa was unable to breathe and was scared that her brother would kill her, but he stopped, apologized, and started crying when he realized what he had done. On another occasion, however, Honken had tried to drown Alyssa in a hotel pool. She could not breathe and swallowed water before Honken released her. Alyssa was scared of him and was always trying to please him.

In 1984, Honken had plotted a bank robbery in which the person whom he would convince to commit the robbery for him would then be killed and thrown into a pond. In 1986, Honken schemed to kill one of his accomplices after stealing a car. Between 1986 and 1989, he was involved in a conversation which mentioned the possibility of killing his brother's business partner to collect a million dollar life insurance policy. In 1990, Honken raped and threatened his girlfriend. He later threatened to lock her in the basement and wondered how long it would take for her to be found, and how deep someone would need to be buried for them not to be plowed up by farm machinery.

=== Angela Johnson ===
Johnson was born in Forest City, Iowa. Honken and Johnson were in a relationship at the time of the murders, and Johnson, who had a child from a previous marriage, was pregnant by Honken. Johnson was raised by extremely religious grandparents who would hold her down, wave Bibles over her head, and speak in tongues in an attempt to exorcise demons from her. Johnson's mother was an abusive and neglectful alcoholic. During Johnson's trial, it was revealed that she had been molested as a child.

== Drug dealing ==
In the early 1990s, Honken started selling marijuana and cocaine. After finishing a year of community college chemistry classes with an A-minus, Honken decided to become both a drug manufacturer and a dealer using what he had learned. He also decided to switch to meth.

In 1992, Honken enlisted his best friend, Tim Cutkomp, moved to Arizona, and borrowed $5,000 from his brother to buy chemicals and equipment. Within a year, Honken and Cutkomp managed to produce several pounds of nearly pure meth, which they sold in northeast Iowa, primarily through two dealers: Terry DeGeus and Greg Nicholson. The two made hundreds of thousands of dollars from several drug runs. On one of his drug runs, Honken met Angela Johnson, who was then dating DeGeus. Johnson told Honken that DeGeus was personally using too much meth which was supposed to be sold, and that they should deal with each other instead. The two started a romantic relationship and Johnson soon became pregnant with Honken's child.

Honken, seeking to expand his drug dealing business, studied chemistry textbooks at the library, read science journals, kept extremely thorough records, made plans to expand his business to the Internet, and considered writing his own book about how to make and sell meth in the United States.

In March 1993, Honken and Cutkomp were arrested on federal drug trafficking charges. While preparing for his trial, Honken discovered through legal documents that Nicholson had turned witness. He wore a wire to a meeting and recorded Honken making a future $3,000 deal. Authorities had found almost 150 grams of pure meth in Nicholson's house, and he'd agreed to become an informant in exchange for leniency.

Over the next few weeks, Nicholson became extremely paranoid. His then-wife, Leslie Olson, said he prevented her from going outside or staying near windows for very long. The two ended their relationship shortly after Nicholson's arrest. Honken had threatened Nicholson in the past, saying he could order a hit on him or anyone else if he wanted.

Honken said he planned to plead guilty, and a hearing was scheduled for July 30, 1993.

== Murders and court proceedings ==
Honken was released on bond and searched for Nicholson's whereabouts. Johnson bought a pistol on July 7, 1993. The two eventually located Nicholson. On July 24, 1993, Johnson pretended to be a lost saleswoman to get into Nicholson's home, where she and Honken bound him and forced him to record a statement claiming that Honken was innocent. The two then bound and gagged Nicholson and his new girlfriend, 37-year-old Lori Ann Duncan. Johnson took Duncan's daughters, 10-year-old Kandace Duncan and 6-year-old Amber Duncan, telling them that they were going on a surprise trip.

Honken and Johnson forced the family into a car at gunpoint and drove to a wooded area outside of the city. Honken took the adults out of the car, walked them into the woods, and executed them in front of a pre-dug shallow grave. He then did the same to the children.

On July 30, 1993, Honken gave his attorney the recording and said he was changing his plea. Upon learning that Nicholson had disappeared, the government turned to Honken's former dealer, DeGeus. Honken told Cutkomp that he was worried about DeGeus turning on him.

On November 5, 1993, DeGeus also disappeared. The night before his disappearance, he dropped his 10-year-old daughter off at his mother's house and said he was going to meet Johnson. Johnson lured DeGeus to a country club under the guise of wanting to rekindle their relationship, then drove to an abandoned house where Honken was waiting. Honken beat, shot, and buried DeGeus. Without any witnesses, the government was forced to drop its case against Honken.

In the winter of 1993 or 1994, Honken went to Cutkomp and said he needed to destroy a pistol. The two used a blowtorch to cut and melt the gun into multiple pieces, which they discarded in ditches along a country road.

In the fall of 1995, Honken recruited a man named Dan Cobeen to help him manufacture meth. However, Cobeen became a police informant. On February 7, 1996, officers executed a search warrant on Honken's house and discovered his meth lab, chemicals, equipment, books, and notes, including ones on manufacturing drugs and how to bind and gag people. Honken and Cutkomp were indicted on federal drug trafficking charges and they were captured in Mason City on April 29, 1996. While awaiting trial, Honken was released on bond. During this time, he plotted to murder Cobeen, police officers, and chemists, and to destroy evidence against him.

Cutkomp decided to become an informant. He suspected that Honken had killed Nicholson and was afraid of being wrongfully accused of murder. Cutkomp wore a wire while he was around Honken during their time on pretrial release. Cutkomp recorded Honken talking about his plans to kill witnesses and implicitly referenced killing witnesses in 1993. He compared the feeling of killing someone to a football game, saying, "Once you go a certain distance, there ain't no turning back." When Cutkomp asked Honken if killing people bothered him, he replied "Nope. Never think about it. Never. [...] Never dream about it. Never nothing. [...] Thought I'd have nightmares."

Honken was recorded calling Cobeen a "rat" and saying he would kill him no matter what. "I've climbed far bigger hills than that little hill. Even if I'm in prison for [...] 15 years, whatever. When I get out, he's still dead." When Cutkomp expressed concern over the murders, Honken said Cobeen had forced his hand: "They made me choose between my family and them. I'm sorry, but that ain't no choice."

After Cutkomp gave the recordings to federal investigators, Honken's bond was revoked. While in jail, Honken confessed to fellow inmates that he'd killed witnesses from an earlier case. He plotted to murder Cutkomp and gave a fellow inmate directions to Cutkomp's house. Honken conspired with another inmate to escape from jail by breaking a hole in the wall of his cell and having Johnson deliver a hacksaw and a rope. However, the plot was discovered and stopped by guards.

For his cooperation, Cutkomp was sentenced to 4.5 years in prison.

=== Guilty plea to manufacturing and distributing meth ===
On June 2, 1997, Honken pleaded guilty to attempting to distribute meth and conspiring to manufacture and distribute meth. He faced a minimum of 10 years in prison. Honken's lawyer, Alfredo Parrish, requesting a sentence of 10 to 15 years, attacked the government's handling of the evidence in the case. He also pointed to Honken's youth, saying, "The court needs to consider his age. He can be rehabilitated. This is an intelligent young man." On behalf of the prosecution, Assistant U.S. Attorney Pat Reinert argued for a life sentence, spending hours making a case for sentencing enhancements on the grounds that Honken had something to do with the disappearances of Nicholson, Lori, Kandace, Amber, and DeGeus: "It appears that these people are dead. We believe the defendant was involved in this. We believe that he was ready to take violent actions again. [...] The maximum sentence sends a message to this defendant and other defendants who are thinking about taking things into their own hands ... that that conduct is unacceptable."

U.S. District Judge Mark W. Bennett imposed sentencing enhancements on Honken for attempting to obstruct justice and having a major role in the conspiracy, and granted a deduction for Honken accepting responsibility. However, he declined to rule on whether Honken likely had a role in the 1993 disappearances. Consequently, Honken's offense level under the United States Federal Sentencing Guidelines was set at 38, which called for a sentence of 235 to 293 months in prison. Honken received the maximum sentence. He was also ordered to serve five years of supervised release and fined $1,100. Upon hearing the sentence, Honken seemed visibly disappointed. He'd apologized, saying "I wasn't expecting things to go this way. I let down my family, my children most of all. ... I wish there was some way to go back and start over, but obviously there isn't."

In 1999, the prosecution appealed the sentencing deduction due to the severity of Honken's attempt to obstruct the investigation against him. An appellate court agreed, adding that "one can easily conclude from witnesses' testimony that appellee caused the disappearance of one or more persons, including prospective prosecution witnesses, in 1993." Without the deduction, Honken faced 27 to 33.75 years in prison. At his resentencing hearing in January 2000, Honken asked for leniency, saying he had successfully participated in a drug rehabilitation program and taken educational programs. He claimed he had nothing to do with the 1993 disappearances, saying:

For years now, the government has made these terrible accusations against me ... I didn't kill anyone and even though that hasn't been proven, the accusations have repeatedly been used against me. I realize I am here because of my own actions. I am sorry for what I have done, but I haven't done these heinous crimes the government accuses me of. I have seen people get murdered here and being in a place like this makes the sentence I have now almost like a death sentence.

Bennett resentenced Honken to 27 years in prison, saying the minimum sentence was sufficiently harsh. Referring to the 1993 disappearances, Bennett said that while the government had made a compelling case for Honken likely being responsible, his view was that if the government believed Honken was a murderer, they should charge him with murder.

While in prison, Honken made plans to escape, and then murder witnesses, law enforcement officers, and the federal prosecutor. To prepare for his escape, Honken and fellow inmates practiced retrieving an officer's weapon, learning how to remove handcuffs with minimal tools, and training in martial arts scenarios centering around encounters with an armed escort.

== Discovery of the murders and trial ==
In 2000, Johnson's friend, Christi Gaubatz, decided to talk to the police. She told them about Honken's and Johnson's search for Nicholson and that she had seen the pistol used in the 1993 murders in Johnson's closet before it was destroyed. On July 26, 2000, Johnson was charged with five counts of murder in furtherance of a continuing criminal enterprise, and she was captured on July 30. In custody, she befriended her cellblock neighbor, Robert "Bobby" Gene McNeese, a career criminal and informant who was serving a life sentence for trying to import $5 million of heroin and morphine into Florida while he was already in federal prison for bank robbery. He and Johnson passed notes through the food slot in McNeese's door about their lives in jail and their childhoods.

McNeese got Johnson to confess to the murders by claiming he could find another inmate who could take the blame. However, he told Johnson that she would need to say everything she knew. Johnson discussed the murders in detail, which McNeese secretly recorded. Johnson gave him written notes and a map revealing the locations of the victim's bodies. McNeese gave the notes and map to the authorities, and the victims' bodies were recovered shortly in October 2000. Upon learning that she had been tricked, Johnson attempted to hang herself.

Honken was charged with the murders in 2001. The government announced they would seek death sentences for both Honken and Johnson. After a court found that Honken posed an extreme security risk due to his history of escape attempts and threatening witnesses, he was ordered to wear a stun belt and be shackled and bolted to the floor during his trial. To minimize potential prejudice, the court ordered for officers not to move Honken in the presence of the jury and that table skirts be placed on the counsel tables so the jury would be unable to see the shackles. The shackles were fitted with a chain so Honken could move normally without the shackles making noise.

A judge initially barred McNeese from testifying against Johnson at her trial on the grounds that he was acting as a federal agent. However, this decision was overturned since the government had never asked McNeese to cooperate in the case against Johnson. In September 2001, McNeese had a 10-year sentence that he was serving for money laundering reduced to three years. U.S. District Judge Michael Joseph Melloy praised him for solving the murders, stating: "It's hard to imagine anybody who's done more than Mr. McNeese".

In addition to requesting the sentence reduction, Patrick Reinert wrote a letter to the U.S. Attorney's Office in Tampa, Florida, informing officials there that McNeese had almost singlehandedly solved five murders, including those of two federal witnesses and two children. In 2006, with the support of federal prosecutors in Florida, McNeese's life sentence was reduced to 20 years. He was released from prison on November 14, 2017.

=== Witnesses against Honken ===
Honken and Johnson were tried separately. Honken was tried first, with his trial starting in October 2004. His lawyers pointed to the lack of physical evidence linking him to the murders. The prosecution said he had every reason to kill the victims and presented 65 witnesses against him. Among them were many of the inmates to whom Honken had confessed, including Fred Tokars. Tokars testified that Honken described strangling Lori Duncan and Greg Nicholson, and killed the children since "they could have been witnesses". In 2005, Tokars stopped an attempted escape by Honken, in which he plotted to escape with the help of white supremacists and murder witnesses.

Ron McIntosh said Honken told him he killed the children since they "wouldn't be quiet, or wouldn't shut up." Dennis Putzier said Honken had bragged about murdering witnesses in 1993. Another inmate said Honken killed "rats" and children "raised by rats". Prosecutors played a tape in which Honken was recorded saying that he liked killing people and compared the feeling to getting high on drugs. During cross-examination, a defense attorney questioned why someone like Honken would confide in "a couple of crackheads who steal hogs" for a living. "They are people who have no future," referring to the inmates. He said Honken was "a young man infatuated with drug manufacturing, basically a nerd."

=== Honken's sentencing ===
On October 14, 2004, Honken was convicted of all 17 counts against him, including five counts of murder in furtherance of a continuing criminal enterprise. During the sentencing phase, the prosecution said Honken, whom they described as an "evil mastermind", deserved to die since he had committed mass murder, killed children, killed a second time months after committing the four initial murders, showed no remorse, and had continued to try to escape prison and commit even more murders while in maximum security prisons. Honken's defense presented testimony from his family, and pointed to his age and lack of prior violent convictions as mitigating factors.

On October 27, 2004, jurors recommended life sentences for Honken for killing the adult victims and death sentences for killing the children. He was formally sentenced to death on October 11, 2005.

=== Johnson's trial, sentencing, and commutation ===
In 2005, Johnson was found guilty of five counts of murder in furtherance of a continuing criminal enterprise. Prosecutors said she deserved to die since she willingly participated in the murder of children and lacked remorse. Johnson's defense team pointed to her dysfunctional upbringing and argued that she did not know Honken was going to kill the victims. Johnson admitted that she was involved in Honken's crimes, but blamed him for the murders and said he had manipulated her.

In June 2005, a federal jury condemned Johnson to death on four counts. She was formally sentenced to death on December 19, 2005. During her sentencing hearing, Johnson continued to blame Honken, but said "I regret I wasn't strong enough." She called him a "sociopath who will never admit to what he has done."

The presiding judge Mark W. Bennett stated, "I am troubled by the lack of certainty in the record concerning the precise involvement of Angela Johnson in these crimes". However, under federal law, he was bound to the jury's verdict. In July 2007, the United States Court of Appeals for the Eighth Circuit upheld the conviction, finding sufficient evidence to conclude that Johnson had participated in the murders.

In March 2012, Bennett vacated Johnson's death sentence, citing a failure by her attorneys to introduce evidence about her mental state from an "alarmingly" dysfunctional defense team. In December 2014, federal prosecutors later announced they would not pursue a second death sentence for Johnson. Her lawyer said she was extremely relieved and grateful upon hearing of the decision. Later that month, she was re-sentenced to life in prison without parole. As part of an agreement, she agreed to drop all of her appeals. Johnson is currently serving her sentence at FCI Aliceville.

== Honken's execution ==
Honken exhausted his appeals on October 5, 2015, but at the time, the U.S. federal government had a de facto moratorium on capital punishment.

On July 25, 2019, United States attorney general William Barr announced that the moratorium on federal executions would be lifted after approving the use of the single drug pentobarbital for federal executions. An execution date of January 15, 2020, was set for Honken. On November 20, 2019, U.S. District judge Tanya Chutkan issued a preliminary injunction preventing the resumption of federal executions. Honken and the other three plaintiffs in the case argued that the use of pentobarbital could violate the Federal Death Penalty Act of 1994.

On December 5, 2019, the Supreme Court denied a stay of Chutkan's injunction, while the United States Court of Appeals for the District of Columbia Circuit reviewed Chutkan's decision.

While in prison, Honken converted to Roman Catholicism. The archbishop of Newark, Cardinal Joseph W. Tobin, had written to President Donald Trump in early July 2020 asking him to commute Honken's sentence, claiming that he had witnessed Honken's "spiritual growth in faith and compassion".

In April 2020, a divided panel of the D.C. Circuit vacated District judge Chutkan's injunction in a per curiam decision. Circuit judges Gregory G. Katsas and Neomi Rao wrote concurring opinions concluding that Honken may be executed, but for different reasons. Circuit judge David S. Tatel dissented, arguing the statute explicitly requires the federal government to follow state execution protocols. On June 29, 2020, the Supreme Court denied Honken's petition for review, with Justices Ruth Bader Ginsburg and Sonia Sotomayor dissenting.

On July 17, 2020, Honken was executed by lethal injection. His final words were a reciting of the poem "Heaven-Haven" by Gerard Manley Hopkins:

I have desired to go
Where springs not fail,
To fields where flies no sharp and sided hail
And a few lilies blow.

And I have asked to be
Where no storms come,
Where the green swell is in the havens dumb,
And out of the swing of the sea.

Honken then said "Hail Mary, Mother of God, pray for me." He was pronounced dead at 3:36 p.m. CDT.

== See also ==
- Capital punishment by the United States federal government
- List of people executed by the United States federal government
- List of people executed in the United States in 2020
- List of serial killers in the United States

Executions carried out by the United States federal government
| Preceded by Wesley Ira Purkey July 16, 2020 | Dustin Lee Honken; July 17, 2020 | Succeeded by Lezmond Mitchell August 26, 2020 |
Executions carried out in the United States
| Preceded by Wesley Ira Purkey – Federal government July 16, 2020 | Dustin Lee Honken – Federal government July 17, 2020 | Succeeded by Lezmond Mitchell – Federal government August 26, 2020 |
