= List of inmates at the United States Penitentiary, Terre Haute =

List of notable current and former inmates at the US Penitentiary, Terre Haute

This is a list of notable current and former inmates at the United States Penitentiary, Terre Haute. As of 2021, 16 inmates have been executed (12 under President Trump in the seven-month span between July 2020 and January 2021), and a further three inmates are imprisoned on death row awaiting execution - two of them here and the third at ADX Florence.

== Death row ==
Inmate name	Age	Register number	Status	Details
Robert Gregory Bowers	54	39188-068	Sentenced to death on August 3, 2023.	White supremacist convicted and sentenced to death for the antisemitic mass-shooting of the Tree of Life – Or L'Simcha Congregation synagogue on October 27, 2018, which killed 11 people and injured 6 others.
Dylann Storm Roof	32	28509-171	Sentenced to death on January 11, 2017.	White supremacist convicted in 2016 of federal hate crimes and firearms charges for committing the Charleston church shooting at Emanuel African Methodist Episcopal Church in 2015, during which 9 parishioners were killed.

=== Executed ===
Inmate name	Year sentenced	Date of execution	Age	Register number	Details	Under President
Brandon Bernard	2000	December 10, 2020	40	91908-080	Convicted at the age of 18 for his involvement in a carjacking and the deaths of a couple visiting Texas. Co-defendant Christopher Vialva was also executed for the crime.	Donald Trump
Alfred Bourgeois	2004	December 11, 2020	56	98911-079	Convicted of abusing, sexually molesting, and murdering his 2-year-old daughter at Naval Air Station Corpus Christi.	Donald Trump
Juan Raul Garza	1993	June 19, 2001	44	62728-079	Drug kingpin convicted in 1993 of murdering or ordering the murders of three rival drug traffickers and of importing thousands of pounds of marijuana from Mexico.	George W. Bush
Orlando Cordia Hall	1994	November 19, 2020	49	26176-077	Convicted of the drug-related kidnapping, rape, and murder of 16-year-old Lisa Rene.	Donald Trump
Dustin John Higgs	2000	January 16, 2021	48	31133-037	Convicted in 2000 for ordering the murders of three women on federal land.	Donald Trump
Dustin Lee Honken	2005	July 17, 2020	52	06951-029	Convicted of murdering five people in Iowa in 1993 in an attempt to hide his methamphetamine drug dealing operation.	Donald Trump
Corey Johnson	1993	January 14, 2021	52	27832-054	Convicted for his participation in a series of drug-related killings. Two of Johnson's accomplices – Richard Tipton and James H. Roane Jr. – were similarly condemned to federal death row but their death sentences were commuted to life imprisonment upon receiving clemency from outgoing President Joe Biden in 2024.	Donald Trump
Louis Jones Jr.	1995	March 18, 2003	53	27265-077	Convicted in 1995 of the kidnapping, sexual assault and murder of U.S. Army Private Tracie Joy McBride at Goodfellow Air Force Base in San Angelo, Texas.	George W. Bush
William Emmett LeCroy Jr.	2001	September 22, 2020	50	45795-019	Convicted of raping and murdering Joann Lee Tiesler, a 30-year-old nurse, before stealing her car and attempting to flee the country.	Donald Trump
Daniel Lewis Lee	1997	July 14, 2020	47	21303-009	With Chevie Kehoe, he kidnapped, tortured, and murdered a gun dealer and his family in Tilly, Arkansas. The stolen property they obtained from the family was taken to Spokane, Washington in an attempt to begin a whites-only nation.	Donald Trump
Timothy McVeigh	1997	June 11, 2001	33	12076-064	Convicted in 1997 of the 1995 bombing of the Alfred P. Murrah Federal Building in Oklahoma City, which killed 168 people.	George W. Bush
Lezmond Charles Mitchell	2003	August 26, 2020	38	48685-008	Convicted of carjacking-related homicide of a 63-year-old woman and her 9-year-old granddaughter. Mitchell stabbed the woman to death and drove around 40 miles (64 km) with her body in the vehicle along with her granddaughter. He then slit the 9-year old's throat. He was the only Native American on death row until his execution.	Donald Trump
Lisa Marie Montgomery	2008	January 13, 2021	52	11072-031	Convicted in 2007 of murdering Bobbie Jo Stinnett, aged 23, and kidnapping her unborn baby from her womb in 2004. She was at FMC Carswell, which housed the death row for women, until the day before her execution. She is the only woman to date executed by the federal government in the 21st century.	Donald Trump
Keith Dwayne Nelson	1999	August 28, 2020	45	07440-031	Convicted of kidnapping, raping, and murdering 10-year-old Pamela Butler in Kansas City, Missouri.	Donald Trump
Wesley Ira Purkey	2003	July 16, 2020	68	14679-045	Convicted of raping and killing a 16-year-old girl before dismembering, burning and then dumping the teen's body in a septic pond.	Donald Trump
Christopher Andre Vialva	2000	September 24, 2020	40	91909-080	Convicted for his involvement in a carjacking and the deaths of a couple visiting Texas. Co-defendant Brandon Bernard was also executed for the crime.	Donald Trump

== Former death row ==
Inmate name	Age	Register number	Status	Details
Joseph Edward Duncan III	58	12561-023	Sentenced to death on August 27, 2008; died on March 28, 2021, from glioblastoma while awaiting execution.	Serial child molester and rapist; sentenced to death for a 2005 kidnapping and quadruple murder in Idaho; pleaded guilty in state court to one murder in California and suspected in two other murders in Washington state.
David Paul Hammer	60	24507-077	Sentenced to death in 1993, commuted to life imprisonment in 2014; died in 2019 of natural causes.	Prisoner convicted of killing an inmate at USP Allenwood, sentenced to death in 1998, but re-sentenced to life in prison in 2014. Transferred to ADX Florence after re-sentencing, he died in 2019.
Paul Hardy	54	24329-034	Sentenced to life imprisonment in 2011; now at USP McCreary.	Drug-dealer in New Orleans, Louisiana who was the triggerman in the murder of Kim Groves, who was set to testify in an assault case against New Orleans police officer Len Davis, who she witnessed beating a suspect in a police shooting. Davis ordered Hardy to kill Groves. In 2011, a judge ruled Hardy intellectually disabled and re-sentenced him to life imprisonment.
John McCullah	62	03040-063	Serving a life sentence. Now at USP Tucson	Sentenced to death for the drug-related kidnapping and murder of a man in Oklahoma. The 10th Circuit granted McCullah a new penalty hearing in 1996, and in February 2000, McCullah was resentenced to life in prison. While incarcerated at USP Coleman I, he fatally assaulted another inmate on the orders of female correctional officer, Erin Sharma. Sharma was sentenced to life in prison for the murder and McCullah was moved to ADX Florence. In July 2019, McCullah was transferred from USP Allenwood to Terre Haute.
Gary Lee Sampson	62	23976-038	Sentenced to death on December 23, 2003. Sentenced to death again on January 9, 2017. Died in 2021.	Carjacked and murdered three people in 2001.
Bruce Carneil Webster	53	26177-077	Sentenced to death in 1996; overturned in 2019, and upheld in 2020. Now at USP Allenwood.	Convicted and sentenced to death for a drug-related kidnapping and rape resulting in death. (Co-defendant of Orlando Hall). Death sentence vacated on grounds of intellectual disability on June 18, 2019. Ruling was upheld by the U.S. Court of Appeals for the Seventh Circuit on September 22, 2020.
Ronell Wilson	39	71460-053	Sentenced to life imprisonment in 2010; now at USP Coleman I.	Gang leader on Staten Island, New York; murdered NYPD detectives James Nemorin and Rodney Andrews, who were conducting a sting operation to buy an illegal gun in 2003. Originally sentenced to death in 2007, a judge determined that Wilson was mentally handicapped, and therefore was not eligible for the death penalty under the Eighth Amendment.
Len Davis	62	24325-034	Originally sentenced to death in 1996. Resentenced to death in 2005. Commuted to life imprisonment by President Joe Biden on December 23, 2024.	Former New Orleans police officer who ordered the murder of a young woman who witnessed his beating of a witness.
Marvin Charles Gabrion	73	09184-055	Originally sentenced to death on March 16, 2002. Transferred to MCFP Springfield. Commuted to life imprisonment by President Joe Biden on December 23, 2024.	Convicted in 2002 of the 1997 kidnapping and murder of 19-year-old Rachel Timmerman on federal land; she had accused Gabrion of rape. Gabrion was the first person to receive a federal death sentence after the federal death penalty was reinstated in 1988.
Jurijus Kadamovas	60	21050-112	Sentenced to death on March 12, 2007. Commuted to life imprisonment by President Joe Biden on December 23, 2024.	Kadamovas and Mikhel were sentenced to death for kidnapping five people, demanding more than $5.5 million in ransom from relatives and associates, and killing the kidnapped victims. The bodies were tied with weights and dumped in a reservoir near Yosemite National Park.
Iouri Gherman Mikhel	61	23675-112	Sentenced to death on March 12, 2007. Commuted to life imprisonment by President Joe Biden on December 23, 2024.	Kadamovas and Mikhel were sentenced to death for kidnapping five people, demanding more than $5.5 million in ransom from relatives and associates, and killing the kidnapped victims. The bodies were tied with weights and dumped in a reservoir near Yosemite National Park.
James H. Roane Jr.	60–61	32923-083	Sentenced to death on June 1, 1993. Commuted to life imprisonment without parole by President Joe Biden on December 23, 2024.	Roane, Tipton and a third co-defendant Corey Johnson were convicted under a federal law and sentenced to death for murdering a total of 11 people to further the influence of their drug trafficking syndicate in Virginia. The death sentences of both Tipton and Roane were commuted to life without parole on December 23, 2024, while Johnson was executed by lethal injection on January 14, 2021.
Richard Tipton	56	32922-083	Sentenced to death on June 1, 1993. Commuted to life imprisonment without parole by President Joe Biden on December 23, 2024.	Roane, Tipton and a third co-defendant Corey Johnson were convicted under a federal law and sentenced to death for murdering a total of 11 people to further the influence of their drug trafficking syndicate in Virginia. The death sentences of both Tipton and Roane were commuted to life without parole on December 23, 2024, while Johnson was executed by lethal injection on January 14, 2021.
Alejandro Enrique Umaña	41	23077-058	Sentenced to death in 2010. Commuted to life imprisonment by President Joe Biden on December 23, 2024.	High-ranking member of the international street gang MS-13; convicted of racketeering conspiracy and murder in connection with four gang-related killings; Umaña's story has been featured in several documentaries regarding MS-13.
Thomas Steven Sanders	69	15967-043	Sentenced to death in 2014. Commuted to life imprisonment by President Joe Biden on December 23, 2024.	Kidnapping and murder of 12-year-old Lexis Roberts in 2010.
Ricardo Sanchez Jr.	43	75820-004	Sentenced to death in 2009. Commuted to life imprisonment by President Joe Biden on December 23, 2024.	Convicted and sentenced to death for involvement in the drug-related killing the Escobedo family, including two children along Florida's Turnpike on 2006.
Daniel Troya	43	75817-004	Sentenced to death in 2009. Commuted to life imprisonment by President Joe Biden on December 23, 2024.	Convicted and sentenced to death for involvement in the drug-related killing the Escobedo family, including two children along Florida's Turnpike on 2006.

== Non-death row ==
Inmate name	Register number	Status	Details
Isaac Aguigui	17746-035	Serving a life sentence; transferred from the United States Disciplinary Barracks	Leader of FEAR terrorist group; serving a life sentence for the murder of his pregnant wife under military law; also serving two life terms in state court in Georgia
Anthony Casso	16802-050	Served 13 consecutive life sentences plus 455 years until his death on December 15, 2020.	Former underboss of the Lucchese Crime Family; apprehended in 1993 after 30 months on the run; pleaded guilty to murder, murder conspiracy, and racketeering. Placed in the Federal Witness Protection Program, but was subsequently removed from the program because of multiple violations of program rules.
Raymond "Shrimp Boy" Chow	27822-054	Serving a life sentence.	Chinese-American organized crime boss. Convicted in 2016 on 162 counts, including murder in aid of racketeering, racketeering conspiracy, conspiring to murder another rival, receiving and transporting stolen liquor across state lines, and money laundering. Sentenced to two life terms plus 20 years.
Barry Croft	11796-509	Serving a 19-year and seven-month sentence; transferred to ADX Florence and scheduled for release on June 15, 2037.	Leader of the Three Percenters militia group, convicted of kidnapping conspiracy, conspiracy to use a weapon of mass destruction, and possessing an unregistered destructive device for his role in the plot to kidnap Michigan governor Gretchen Whitmer.
Radric Davis	65556-019	Served 29 months of a 39-month sentence.	Known as rapper Gucci Mane, pled guilty to possession of a firearm by a convicted felon, was given a 39-month sentence of which he served 29 months.
Jay Doherty		Served what was originally a one year sentence.	Former president of City Club of Chicago and Commonwealth Edison consultant. Began serving a one year sentence at the prison on September 30, 2025 for a bribery conspiracy and falsifying utility company records conviction. He would be released by April 2026 and did not appeal conviction.
Manuel Flores	62788-079	Serving a life sentence.	Hitman for Juan Raul Garza, who was executed by the federal government in 2001.
Osiel Cárdenas Guillén	62604-079	Served a 25-year sentence. Released on August 30, 2024.	Succeeded Juan García Ábrego as leader of the Gulf Cartel; extradited to the U.S. from Mexico in 2007 and pleaded guilty to threatening to murder U.S. law enforcement agents, drug trafficking, and money laundering. Initially served his sentence at ADX Florence, then was transferred to USP Florence High and then USP Lewisburg and finally this prison.
Chevie Kehoe	21300-009	Serving three consecutive life sentences.	White supremacist convicted on charges of racketeering, murder in aid of racketeering, and robbery conspiracy in connection with the kidnapping, torture, and murders of William and Nancy Mueller and their 8-year-old daughter, Sarah Powell. Co-defendant Daniel Lewis Lee was executed for the murders on July 14, 2020.
Robert Merritt	59317-066	Serving a life sentence.	Accomplice to Lamont Lewis in a firebombing of a house of the mother of a federal witness ordered by Kaboni Savage, which killed six people including 4 children. Another accomplice, Kidada Savage, is serving a life sentence at FCI Tallahassee. Lamont Lewis is serving a 40-year sentence, and Kaboni Savage is serving a life sentence (formerly on federal death row) at ADX Florence.
Brian David Mitchell	15815-081	Serving two consecutive life sentences. Now at FCI Lewisburg.	Former street preacher and pedophile; convicted in 2010 of interstate kidnapping and unlawful transportation of a minor across state lines in connection with the 2002 kidnapping of 14-year-old Elizabeth Smart. Mitchell and Wanda Barzee repeatedly raped and tortured Smart during her captivity and made threats against her family if she escaped. The two also punished her for defending herself and played mind games with her. In conjunction with Mitchell, Barzee was sentenced to 15 years for her part in the kidnapping.
Abdul Hakim Murad	37437-054	Transferred to the United States Penitentiary, Victorville, a high-security facility; serving a life sentence.	Al-Qaeda operative; convicted in 1996 of terrorism conspiracy in connection with planning Project Bojinka, a foiled plot conceived by senior Al-Qaeda member Khalid Sheikh Mohammed to bomb twelve planes over the Pacific Ocean in a 48-hour period.
Drew Peterson	07018-748	Serving a 78-year sentence, transferred out in 2019.	On September 6, 2012, Peterson was found guilty of the premeditated murder of his third wife, Kathleen Savio.
Lawrence "Larry" Ray	58374-053	Serving a 60-year sentence, scheduled for release on March 29, 2071.	Convicted in 2022 of sex trafficking, extortion, forced labor, conspiracy, money laundering, and other offenses.
James Rosemond	17903-054	Serving a life sentence plus 30 years.	Also known as "Jimmy Henchman", former music representative, charged in 2012 with drug trafficking, obstruction of justice, possessing and using firearms, and conspiracy to commit murder. He was at first sentenced to life plus 20 years in 2015 but had his conviction overturned the following year. In 2017 he stood trial for a third time and was sentenced to life plus 30 years.
Michael Rudkin	17133-014	Served a 90-year sentence until his death on August 24, 2021.	Former correction officer at FCI Danbury in Connecticut; sentenced to prison in 2008 for having sex with an inmate; convicted in 2010 of trying to hire a hitman to kill the inmate, his ex-wife, his ex-wife's boyfriend, and a federal agent while incarcerated at USP Coleman in Florida. He was beaten to death by another inmate on August 24, 2021.
Zaid Safarini	14361-006	Serving a 160-year sentence.	Member of the Abu Nidal Organization; convicted of 21 counts of murder in connection with the 1986 hijacking of Pan Am Flight 73 in Karachi, Pakistan.
Mohamad Shnewer	61283-066	Serving a life sentence.	One of the six men that conspired to attack an Army Base in Fort Dix, New Jersey in the 2007 Fort Dix attack plot.

== See also ==
- United States Penitentiary, Terre Haute
- Capital punishment by the United States federal government
- List of people executed by the United States federal government
- List of U.S. federal prisons
- Federal Bureau of Prisons
- Incarceration in the United States
