= Thomas Steven Sanders =

American convicted murderer (born 1957)

Thomas Sanders
- Undated photo of Sanders
- Born: Thomas Steven Sanders; July 12, 1957 (age 69); Mississippi, U.S.
- Status: Incarcerated
- Convictions: Federal; Kidnapping resulting in death Using a firearm in a violent crime that resulted in death
- Penalty: Federal; Death (2014), commuted to life imprisonment without parole (2024)

Details
- Victims: 2 (1 convicted, 1 accused)
- Date: September 2010
- Country: United States
- Locations: Arizona and Louisiana
- Imprisoned at: United States Penitentiary, Terre Haute (former)

Thomas Steven Sanders (born July 12, 1957) is an American convicted murderer. Sanders, who was reported missing in 1987 and erroneously declared dead in 1994, was charged with the 2010 kidnapping and murder of 12-year-old Lexis Roberts and the murder of Roberts's mother Suellen Roberts. During a road trip back to Las Vegas, Nevada, Sanders killed Suellen in a desert in Arizona, before he forcibly abducted Lexis and held her captive for days before he shot and killed her in Catahoula Parish, Louisiana.

Sanders was prosecuted in federal court for the murder of Lexis, and sentenced to death by the U.S. federal government in 2014. However, his federal death sentence was commuted to life without parole after he received clemency from outgoing president Joe Biden. As of 2026, Sanders still faces state charges in both Arizona and Louisiana for the killings of Lexis and Suellen Roberts.

== Early life ==
Born on July 12, 1957, Thomas Steven Sanders grew up in extreme poverty. His mother, Mary Sue Boothe, grew up in Harrisonburg, Louisiana, as one of 11 children in a household that lacked electricity and running water well into the 1940s and early 1950s. At age 16, Mary Sue left home to escape the burden of constantly caring for younger siblings. Shortly after moving to McComb, Mississippi, she met and married Edward Kilby Sanders. Sanders was the first of the couple's two children and at one point his family resided in a dilapidated shotgun house.

Sanders's father Kilby struggled with severe depression and alcoholism, later becoming suicidal. Despite these issues, Mary Sue emphasized that he always maintained employment and was never violent toward the family. Years later, in 1985, Kilby was involved in a drunk driving accident that left him paralyzed; he died by suicide in 2005 via a pain pill overdose. Sanders was physically and sexually abused during his childhood. At the age of three, Sanders fell from the top of a slide. The impact knocked him unconscious and temporarily robbed him of his ability to walk and talk. The injury left a visible, permanent physical mark, causing his mouth to droop noticeably to one side.

During his adulthood, Sanders was married twice and had four children, but both his marriages ended with divorces. In 1987, Sanders abruptly walked out on his family and disappeared without a trace. Sanders's ex-wife divorced him in 1988 and said that her former husband subjected her to "habitual, cruel and inhuman treatment". After seven years of no contact, in 1994, his former wife, parents and brother jointly petitioned to have him legally declared dead so that his children could receive death benefits.

Unbeknownst to his family, Sanders was alive, moving across several states including Georgia and Tennessee while living under his real name and occasionally using the nickname "Spider." He earned a living working odd jobs as a welder and scrap metal collector while building a history of arrests. In 1994, the year he was declared dead, Sanders was convicted in Georgia of child cruelty and sentenced to two years of probation after being accused of striking a young boy and forcing dirty underwear into the child's face. His legal troubles continued in Tennessee, where he was arrested in 2002 for driving with a suspended license, followed by another arrest in 2004 for possession of drug paraphernalia.

== Murders of Lexis and Suellen Roberts ==
By 2010, Thomas Sanders settled in Las Vegas, Nevada, and he worked and lived in a storage facility, where he met his 31-year-old girlfriend Suellen Roberts. At the time she met Sanders, Suellen, who lived with her 12-year-old daughter Lexis Roberts and her mother, rented a storage unit at the facility to store some of her belongings, and went there two to three times a week. Gradually, Suellen and Sanders began a relationship and often went out for dates.

About two months into their relationship, in September 2010, the couple planned a Labor Day weekend trip to the Grand Canyon with Lexis. Before the trio embarked on the road trip, Sanders went to a store to buy ammunition for a .22 caliber rifle, which he brought on the trip. Throughout the weekend, the couple and Lexis visited numerous attractions in Arizona, and on September 6, 2010, the Monday after the Labor Day weekend, the trio started heading back to Las Vegas. On their way back, Sanders drove to a desert in Arizona near Interstate 40, and according to Sanders, the couple found a place to shoot Sanders's rifle and Suellen practiced shooting it. At that point, Sanders purportedly fired his rifle and fatally shot Suellen.

After the killing of Suellen, Sanders kidnapped Lexis, who witnessed the shooting of her mother, and held her captive for four days while he traveled from Arizona, through New Mexico and Texas, and reached Louisiana. Sanders later drove to a wooded area on Boothe Cemetery Road, where most of his maternal family members was buried. He used the rifle to shoot Lexis four times, including once in her chest and three times in her head. Sanders also used a knife to cut Lexis's throat four times.

The mother-daughter pair remained missing for one to two months before their bodies were found. Lexis's skeletal remains were found by hunters on October 8, 2010, a month after she was killed by Sanders, and her identity was ascertained by the authorities based on her dental records. On November 15, 2010, Suellen's body was discovered in the Arizona desert where she died, and the Yavapai County sheriff's office from Arizona confirmed Suellen's identity in December 2010.

== Arrest and federal charges ==
After the discovery of Lexis Roberts's remains, the investigations gradually uncovered Thomas Sanders's involvement in the murder, and named him a suspect behind the disappearance of Lexis's mother Suellen. As a result, Sanders was placed on the wanted list by the FBI, and a manhunt was conducted to locate the fugitive.

On November 14, 2010, after a manhunt which lasted for more than a week, Sanders was arrested by FBI agents and Harrison County sheriff's deputies at a truck stop in Gulfport, Mississippi. He was held in federal custody for the murder of Lexis, and the discovery of Suellen's corpse linked Sanders to the crime as well.

After his arrest, Sanders was charged under federal law with kidnapping resulting in death. Given the fact that Lexis was kidnapped in Arizona and taken across state lines into Louisiana, where she was murdered, the case was prosecuted under the Federal Kidnapping Act. Sanders pleaded not guilty to the charge. The state of Louisiana expressed their intent to charge Sanders with first-degree murder under state law for the killing of Lexis in the near future.

On January 27, 2011, a federal grand jury indicted Sanders on a new federal count: use of a firearm to commit a crime of violence that resulted in death. This offense similarly warrants the federal death penalty if found guilty. On February 12, 2011, Sanders pleaded not guilty to both counts of kidnapping resulting in death and using a firearm to commit a violent crime.

In August 2011, Sanders was scheduled to stand trial in January 2013 before a federal jury for the abduction-killing of Lexis.

In February 2012, Sanders filed a motion seeking to dismiss the second indictment of using firearms to commit a violent crime resulting in death, and the defence cited that this superseding indictment amounted to double jeopardy because this charge, in addition to the prior kidnapping charge, could result in the death penalty upon conviction and both charges were made for the same crime, which could lead to double punishment for the same act. They also argued that the charge was not brought forward within the first 30 days after Sanders's arrest.

On August 2, 2012, the federal prosecution, led by U.S. Attorney Stephanie A. Finley, announced that they would seek the death penalty against Sanders.

In January 2014, Sanders's defense counsel once again requested the court to dismiss the indictment entirely or proceed with just one of the two federal counts for the upcoming trial, once again citing concerns of double jeopardy.

== Federal prosecution ==
On August 15, 2014, Sanders stood trial in the U.S. District Court in Alexandria and jury selection began on the first day of his trial.

On September 2, 2014, the prosecution made their opening statements, recounting how Sanders kidnapped Lexis Roberts before holding her captive and killing her, and alluded to Sanders's connection to the death of Lexis's mother Suellen. Sanders's defense counsel did not deny that their client had killed Lexis, but they stated that the evidence did not prove it was a federal crime and Sanders should not have been prosecuted in federal court. The jury heard a videotaped confession from Sanders, in which he confessed to murdering both Lexis and Suellen Roberts.

On September 8, 2014, the federal jury found Sanders guilty of kidnapping resulting in death and using a firearm in a violent crime that resulted in death. Sanders was scheduled to return to court on September 16, 2014, to attend his sentencing trial, and the jury could decide between a death sentence or life without parole for Sanders.

During the sentencing trial, the defense argued that Sanders should not be sentenced to death, and presented the details of his troubled childhood and past childhood abuse. The defense also argued that Sanders suffered from diminished responsibility at the time of the offense, which ought to exclude him from the death penalty. Dr. Pablo Stewart, the defense's psychiatric expert, testified that Sanders suffered from head injuries and multiple psychotic symptoms, including auditory and visual hallucinations, delusions and manic and depressive states, and during Dr. Stewart's sessions with Sanders, the latter had wanted the death penalty, and even said at one point that he was descended from aliens, which the psychiatrist alluded to as a sign of delusion.

On September 26, 2014, Sanders was sentenced to death by U.S. District Judge Dee D. Drell upon the jury's unanimous recommendation for capital punishment for both firearm and kidnapping counts.

== Federal death row and commutation ==
After he was sentenced to death by the federal government, from 2014 to 2024, Sanders was incarcerated at the United States Penitentiary, Terre Haute (USP Terre Haute), the designated facility for the nation's federal death row and execution chamber.

In late December 2015, Sanders officially filed a notice of appeal to the 5th U.S. Circuit Court of Appeals against his death sentence and murder conviction. The appeal was forwarded for pending review before the court in April 2017, and the defense filed appeal briefs to the court in November 2019 before the official hearing of the appeal. Oral arguments were scheduled to be made on March 2, 2020, before the 5th U.S. Circuit Court of Appeals.

On March 2, 2020, the 5th U.S. Circuit Court of Appeals conducted a hearing to process Sanders's appeal. The defense urged the court to overturn Sanders's death sentence, stating that their client had a extensive history of mental illness, delusions and brain injuries, and he was also mentally incompetent to stand trial when he was convicted and sentenced to death.

On December 23, 2024, near the end of his presidency, Joe Biden issued a blanket clemency order commuting the death sentences of 37 out of 40 federal death row inmates to life imprisonment without the possibility of parole. Thomas Sanders was among those spared under the order, having his sentence reduced to life in prison. Sanders was one of two federal death row inmates convicted of crimes committed in Louisiana; the other was Len Davis, a former police officer who orchestrated the murder of a witness. Davis's sentence was similarly commuted to life imprisonment.

On March 27, 2025, the 5th U.S. Circuit Court of Appeals ruled on Sanders's appeal. With his death sentence already commuted to life without parole, the court's review centered on his criminal convictions. The court upheld Sanders's first conviction of kidnapping resulting in death, but they vacated the other conviction of using a firearm to commit a violent crime, citing that the imposition of two death sentences for two different charges in the same criminal act amounted to the violation of double jeopardy clause, which barred a defendant from facing cumulative punishments for the same conduct.

== State charges ==
=== Louisiana ===
On April 14, 2025, more than four months after the commutation of his federal death sentence, Thomas Sanders was officially indicted by a Catahoula Parish grand jury for the first-degree murder of 12-year-old Lexis Roberts.

Under Louisiana state law, Sanders could be sentenced to death for first-degree murder if found guilty. Catahoula Parish District Attorney Brad Burget announced that he would be seeking the death penalty against Sanders, and he expressed his strong disapproval of Biden's decision to spare Sanders the federal death sentence, and he regarded the clemency order as a display of disrespect toward the victim given the heinous nature of Lexis's murder. Sanders was the first former federal death row inmate to be indicted on state-level capital charges for the same offenses that originally sent him to federal death row.

By December 2025, Sanders was one of four former federal death row prisoners to face renewed state murder charges for their respective federal cases. One of the remaining three convicts was Brandon Council, who murdered two women during a bank robbery in South Carolina, while the other two were Ricardo Sanchez Jr. and Daniel Troya, who both carjacked and murdered a family of four along Florida's Turnpike.

=== Arizona ===
Beyond his state murder charges in Louisiana for the death of Lexis Roberts, Thomas Sanders faced additional state-level charges in Arizona for murdering her mother, Suellen Roberts. In January 2026, Sanders was transferred from USP Terre Haute to the Yavapai County Jail in Arizona. He was formally arraigned via a remote hearing at the Yavapai County courthouse on charges of first-degree premeditated murder for Suellen's death and first-degree felony murder for Lexis's death. Like in Louisiana, Sander also faced the possibility of the death penalty under Arizona state law for first-degree murder if found guilty. The case was set to be prosecuted by Yavapai County Attorney Dennis McGrane.

In August 2026, it was reported that Sanders would not go on trial for the murders of Suellen and Lexis Roberts until July 2029.

== See also ==
- Capital punishment by the United States federal government
