= The Hardy Boys (disambiguation) =

The Hardy Boys is a mystery novel series

The Hardy Boys can also refer to:

== Adaptations ==
- Hardy Boys (Mickey Mouse Club serial), a 1950s film serial
- The Hardy Boys (1969 TV series), an animated television series
- The Hardy Boys/Nancy Drew Mysteries, a 1977 live action television series, also known as The Hardy Boys
- The Hardy Boys (1995 TV series), a live action television series
- The Hardy Boys (2020 TV series), a live action television series

== See also ==
- Hardie Boys
- Hardy Boys (criminal duo)
- Hardy Boyz, a professional wrestling tag team
- Hard Boyz, a rap group
- Hardly Boys, fictional characters in the television series South Park
