= Juan Garza =

American murderer and drug trafficker

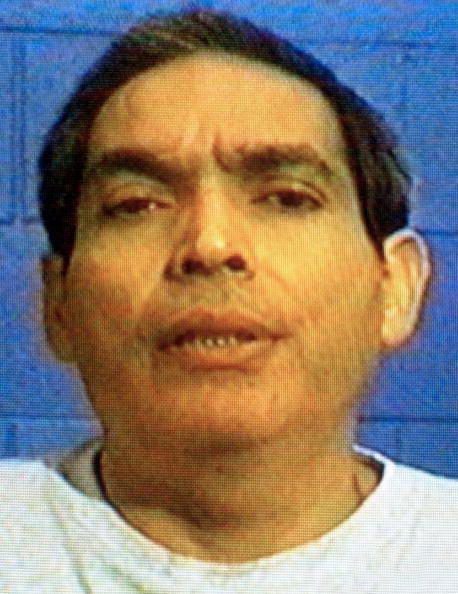
- Garza during a video in which he asks President Bill Clinton to spare his life (2000)
- Born: November 18, 1956; Brownsville, Texas, U.S.
- Died: June 19, 2001 (aged 44); USP Terre Haute, Indiana, U.S.
- Known for: First drug lord to be executed by the US federal government
- Spouse: Elizabeth Garza
- Children: 2
- Status: Executed by lethal injection
- Convictions: Murder in furtherance of a continuing criminal enterprise (3 counts); Engaging in a continuing criminal enterprise Money laundering Conspiracy to import more than 1,000 kilograms of marijuana Conspiracy to possess more than 1,000 kilograms of marijuana with intent to distribute Possession of marijuana with intent to distribute (3 counts)
- Penalty: Death (August 10, 1993)

Details
- Victims: 8+
- Span of crimes: 1990–1992
- Country: United States and Mexico
- State: Texas
- Date apprehended: November 1992

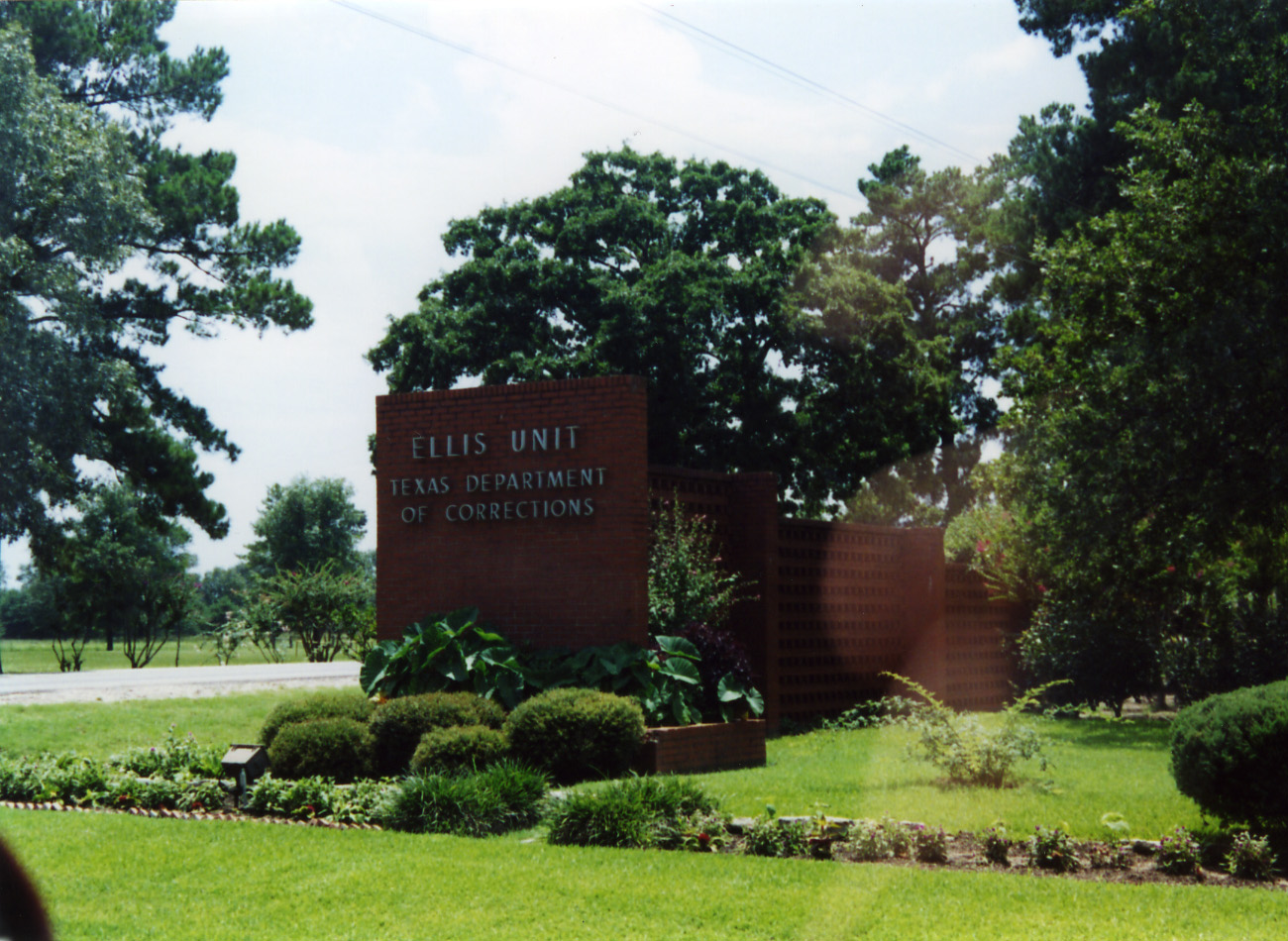
While in Texas state custody Garza was held at the Ellis Unit in Walker County, Texas

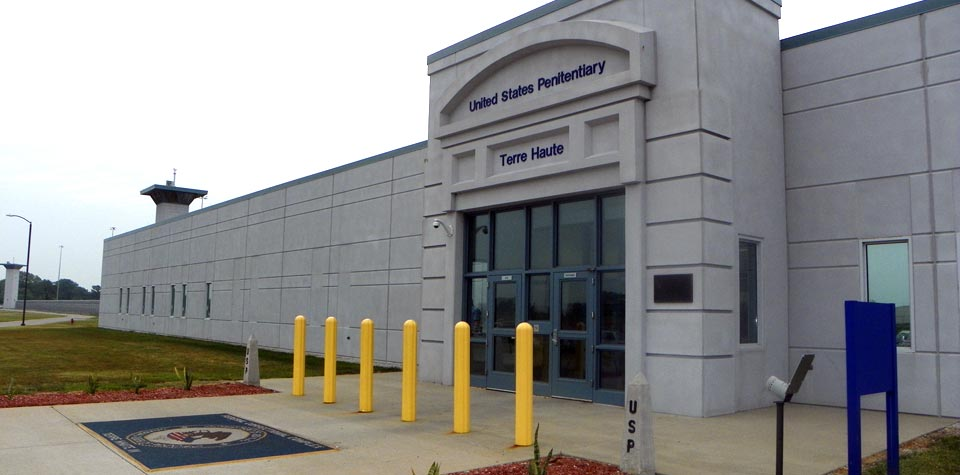
USP Terre Haute, where Garza was held on federal death row and executed

Juan Raul Garza (November 18, 1956 – June 19, 2001) was an American murderer and drug lord who was executed by the United States federal government for three drug-related murders. In addition, Garza was linked to at least five other drug-related murders in Texas and Mexico. He was executed in 2001, eight days after Oklahoma City bomber Timothy McVeigh.

== Early life ==
Juan Raul Garza, the son of Mexican migrant farmworkers, was born in Brownsville, Texas, but spent his early years in Michigan. In his teenage years, he worked in the fields with his parents and sold fruit door to door. Garza initially slept on mats, but eventually saved enough money for a bed.

Although he dropped out of high school, Garza owned a successful construction business. He was well known in the community as a devoted father of four children and the son-in-law of one of the town's most respected pastors. However, in the late 1980s and early 1990s, after returning to Texas, Garza would become the head of a drug-trafficking enterprise that smuggled thousands of kilograms of marijuana from Mexico into the United States. The organization was based in three states: Texas, Louisiana, and Michigan. Garza's organization started with him and members of his group running small quantities of marijuana across the Mexican border. But within a few years, Garza was making frequent trips to Oaxaca, where the marijuana was grown, and transporting it across the border via plane.

== Murders, trial, and execution ==
Garza's drug trafficking ring began to encounter problems. He suffered dents in his profits after some of his shipments were seized by the police. Garza's losses made him suspicious that some of his workers and associates were working with the police. This distrust would ultimately culminate in the murders he ordered and personally committed.

In April 1990, Gilberto Matos became the first confirmed victim of Garza and his gang. Matos was a bodyguard of 32-year-old Erasmo De La Fuente, a smuggler who worked with Garza. Garza suspected that De La Fuente was responsible for a massive shipment (approximately 1,350 pounds) of marijuana being seized by the police. Garza ordered his workers to murder De La Fuente. However, they ran into trouble since De La Fuente had several bodyguards, including Matos.

After Garza ran out of patience, he ordered two of his men, Manuel Flores and his cousin, Israel Flores, to break into Matos's shop and wait for De La Fuente or Matos. If only Matos appeared, they were told to kill him as a warning to De La Fuente of what was to come. When Matos arrived alone, Israel and Manuel forced him to lie down on the floor and then waited to see if De La Fuente would appear. When that didn't happen, Manuel shot Matos in the back of the head. Garza paid Israel and Manuel with cash and a car for the hit.

Five months later, Garza took Israel and his cousin, Jesus Flores, to De La Fuente's nightclub to kill him. Israel became nervous and drank liquor to calm his nerves, but had to be dropped off in an alley after drinking too much. Jesus got his brother, Manuel, and returned to the nightclub. When De La Fuente left and got into his car, Manuel shot him twice. Jesus fired shots into the air to distract the police. After hiding in a ditch for a few hours, Jesus was picked up by Garza. Garza paid the Flores brothers $10,000 each for the hit.

In January 1991, 35-year-old Thomas Rumbo was personally executed by Garza. Rumbo, one of Garza's associates, had been tasked with inspecting trucks with marijuana. After federal officers observed him loading 360 pounds of marijuana into a trailer, they approached him and told him what they saw. Rumbo agreed to turn over the entire shipment. In an attempt to hide what he'd done, he cut a hole in the fence surrounding the trailer and claimed the drugs were stolen.

Garza was not convinced. He drove over to Rumbo's house with two of his workers and made him get into his truck. While they were driving, Garza made two stops. At the first stop, Garza got a gun from one of his workers. At the second stop, Jesus, who owed Garza drug money, volunteered to go along. As they drove, Rumbo was interrogated, but stuck to his story. They eventually arrived at a rural farm road. Garza told Rumbo that he knew he was lying. He told Rumbo to walk home, but then shot him in the back of the head after the man got out. Garza and Jesus moved Rumbo's body into the brush, where Garza shot him four more times in the head and neck. Rumbo had been a truck fleet manager who was active in both the Boy Scouts and the Methodist Church.

Despite Garza's efforts, the police gradually closed in on him. They tapped his phone, watched his activities, seized his assets, and arrested his workers and got them to cooperate. At one point, Garza himself was arrested after making a delivery to an undercover agent. In February 1992, the United States Customs Service launched an assault against Garza's organization. Almost all of Garza's associates were arrested and indicted, but Garza himself managed to escape to Mexico.

Garza was arrested in November 1992, after running low on money and calling an associate to arrange a drug sale. However, this associate had also become an informant, and the phone conversation the two had was taped. The authorities traced the calls and contacted the Mexican government. Garza was arrested and turned over to the United States.

Garza was indicted by the federal government on multiple drug trafficking charges and three counts of murder in furtherance of a continuing criminal enterprise. Prosecutors announced they would pursue a death sentence for him under the Anti-Drug Abuse Act of 1988. They alleged that in addition to the three murders Garza had been indicted for, he was also responsible for at least five other murders, four of which were committed in Mexico. Garza became one of the first people to face execution under this law.

In 1993, Garza was found guilty on all counts. The jury found beyond a reasonable doubt that he was responsible for four unsolved murders in Mexico: the April 1991 murder of 54-year-old Oscar Cantu in Reynosa, the May 1991 murder of 35-year-old Fernando Escobar Garcia, the murder of 32-year-old Lauro Antonio Nieto in May 1991, and the murder of his own son-in-law, 21-year-old Bernabe Sosa, who was found dead near the Rio Grande in January 1992.

Oscar Cantu was killed for losing tens of thousands of dollars of Garza's money. He'd told Garza that the Mexican police had stolen his money and tortured him by electrocuting his genitals. Despite revealing scars to prove he wasn't lying, Garza ordered him killed anyway. Garza also personally executed Fernando Escobar-Garcia Sosa for losing a shipment of marijuana. Israel testified that Garza "said he was going to get rid of Fernando because he didn't have no use for him. He just turned around and shot Fernando a couple of times."

Antonio Nieto was killed for squandering $20,000 of Garza's money while on a trip with Israel. Israel testified that Garza ordered him to kill Nieto: "He said he was getting tired of Tonio. He said if I didn't get rid of Tonio, he would get rid of me and Tonio." Israel shot Nieto twice in the stomach and twice in the head.

Sosa was killed by two of Garza's men for losing one of his drug shipments.

The jury also found beyond a reasonable doubt that Garza had murdered Diana Flores Villarreal, the Flores brothers' sister-in-law, in Texas in July 1991. After he saw Villarreal laughing, Garza had ordered her killed. He had Jesus buy syringes to inject her body with cocaine, so the death would look like an overdose. One of Garza's men, Emilio "Biggie" Gonzalez, punched and choked Villarreal while Jesus injected her with cocaine. Garza told the two men to tie a rope around the woman's neck to ensure she was dead. Garza paid them an ounce of cocaine each for the job. Gonzalez would later turn in Garza in exchange for leniency. Jesus would testify that Garza thought Villarreal "was laughing at him because of the money getting seized and he wasn't able to do nothing. He said nobody was going to laugh at him."

Manuel Flores, Israel Flores, and Jesus Flores received lesser sentences. Manuel was convicted of two counts of murder in furtherance of a continuing criminal enterprise and two drugs charges. He was sentenced to life in prison without parole, and is currently serving his sentence at USP Terre Haute. In exchange for testifying against Garza, Israel, and Jesus both received 10-year sentences and have since been released from prison. During his testimony, Jesus said he was terrified of Garza and followed all of his orders to avoid becoming one of his victims, even killing one of his friends, whom he'd known for more than a decade.

In addition to the aggravating factors, the jury found four mitigating factors: Garza was under a great deal of stress at the time of the murders, he was somewhat young, his codefendants were facing lesser sentences, and all of the victims were also criminals who had voluntarily participated in the drug trade. They unanimously recommended a death sentence, and on August 10, 1993, Garza was formally sentenced to die. During the sentencing phase, it was revealed that Garza had tried to bribe guards to escape and order a hit on the main prosecutor in his case, saying he wanted him tortured first. His mistress tried to bring him a hacksaw blade.

Upon hearing the jury's decision, U.S. District Judge Filemon Vela Sr. told Garza that, "The only thing that I can ask you to consider is to start making your peace to your God."

Garza's supporters claimed his sentence was racially biased. However, Attorney General John Ashcroft pointed out that all of the six men, including Garza, who were charged with murder in the case were Hispanic. The prosecutor, judge, seven of Garza's eight victims, and six of the jurors were also Hispanic. Filemon Vela Sr. said that while he wasn't a personal advocate of the death penalty, Garza's crimes were much worse than his advocates had portrayed.

"I can tell you what the evidence showed - it was not for three homicides. More than that took place at that time, all resultant of drug activities."

On July 13, 1999, federal authorities moved Garza, who had committed the crime in Texas but was under a federal death sentence, out of the custody of the Texas Department of Criminal Justice (TDCJ) and into Federal Bureau of Prisons (BOP) custody. Garza was one of three condemned inmates moved from the Texas state male death row on that day due to the opening of the new federal death row wing in USP Terre Haute, Terre Haute, Indiana. Garza had TDCJ ID 999074 and BOP ID# 62728-079. All appeals failed, and on June 19, 2001, Garza was executed at the Federal Correctional Complex, Terre Haute by lethal injection. Garza's execution took place just eight days after domestic terrorist Timothy McVeigh was put to death at the same location. Garza was initially scheduled to be executed in December 2000, but was granted a short stay of execution. Many people believe the stay was intended to give McVeigh the milestone of becoming the first person executed by the federal government in the modern era. Garza's last meal consisted of steak, french fries, onion rings, diet cola, and three slices of bread. His last words were "I just want to say that I'm sorry, and I apologize for all the pain and grief that I have caused. I ask your forgiveness and God bless." A witness described Garza as resigned to his fate.

"At that point he did somewhat of a sigh, like it's over."

Garza was pronounced dead five minutes later.

== See also ==
- Capital punishment by the United States federal government
- Capital punishment in the United States
- List of people executed by the United States federal government
- List of people executed in the United States in 2001

Executions carried out by the United States federal government
Preceded by Timothy McVeigh June 11, 2001	Juan Garza; June 19, 2001	Succeeded by Louis Jones Jr. March 18, 2003
Executions carried out in the United States
Preceded by Jay D. Scott – Ohio June 14, 2001	Juan Garza – Federal government June 19, 2001	Succeeded by Miguel Richardson – Texas June 26, 2001
