= Larry Ray =

Larry Ray may refer to:

- Larry Ray (baseball) (1958–2023), American baseball right fielder
- Larry Ray (criminal), (born Lawrence Grecco, 1959), American cult leader at Sarah Lawrence College, New York, 2010s
- Larry Ray (musician), Outrageous Cherry guitarist
- Larry Ray (softball), Florida Gators softball coach
