= Murder of Lisa Rene =

1994 murder in Arkansas, United States

Lisa Rene
- Born: 1978; Saint Croix, U.S. Virgin Islands
- Died: September 26, 1994 (aged 16); Pine Bluff, Arkansas, U.S.
- Cause of death: Asphyxiation

Hall in 1994 (left) and shortly before his execution in 2020 (right)

Webster in 1994 (left) and shortly before his removal from death row in 2019 (right)

Demetrius in 1994

Beckley in 1994 (left) and in 2021 (right)

Holloway in 1994

Lisa Rene (1978 – September 26, 1994) was an American teenage girl who was kidnapped from her apartment in Texas, raped over the course of two days, and buried alive in Arkansas. She was kidnapped on September 24, 1994, by four men: 23-year-old Orlando Cordia Hall, 21-year-old Bruce Carneil Webster, 19-year-old Demetrius Kenyon Hall, and 22-year-old Steven Christopher Beckley. Another man, 23-year-old Marvin Terrance Holloway, did not directly participate in the crime, but was present at times and provided financial assistance to the group.

The kidnapping was motivated by the fact that Rene's two brothers had swindled the group out of $4,700 in a drug deal. They had intended to take Rene's brothers, but took her instead since she was the only one at home at the time.

The murder of Rene was the first capital case to be prosecuted by federal prosecutors after the signing of the Federal Death Penalty Act that year. It went into effect less than two weeks before her murder. Orlando Hall, considered to be the ringleader in the crime, would be the first person sentenced to death under the law, and he was executed by the federal government in 2020. Another member, Bruce Webster, was originally sentenced to death, before his sentence was commuted to life without parole on the grounds of intellectual disability. The rest were sentenced to varying prison sentences for their respective roles in the murder.

The murder of Lisa Rene was the subject of the 2001 episode of The FBI Files titled "The Search for Lisa Rene".

== Victim ==
Lisa Rene was born in 1978 in Saint Croix on the U.S. Virgin Islands. Prior to her death, she had moved to Texas to study. Rene was 16 years old when she died. She had wanted to become a doctor.

== Perpetrators ==
Orlando Cordia Hall was born on April 24, 1971, in El Dorado, Arkansas. He had previously been sentenced to 17 years in prison in Arkansas for conspiracy to deliver cocaine. However, he was paroled in December 1993. He previously worked in maintenance. Demetrius Hall, younger brother of Orlando Hall, was born in September 1975, also in El Dorado. The father of the Hall brothers was allegedly abusive towards the brothers and their mother.

Bruce Webster was born on May 31, 1973, in Arkansas. Webster's father physically and sexually abused his wife and children. He also encouraged incest between the siblings, and, on one occasion, between one of the brothers and his mother. He also forced his children to eat hog slop, burned one of his sons with an iron, tortured them with hot sauce and peppers, forced them to beat each other, shot at them when they ran from the house, and killed the family's dog.

== Kidnapping, murder, and arrests ==
In the mid-1990s, Orlando Hall, Bruce Webster, and Marvin Holloway ran a drug trafficking operation in Arkansas. Steven Beckley, who lived in Irving, Texas, helped the trio buy marijuana specifically around Dallas and Fort Worth. Beckley would transport the drugs to Pine Bluff, Arkansas and give them to Holloway, who stashed them in his house.

On September 21, 1994, Orlando flew to Texas for a drug deal and was picked up by Demetrius and Beckley. Orlando and Beckley then met with two drug dealers, Neil Rene (Lisa's biological brother) and Stanfield Vitalis (Lisa's half-brother), and gave them $4,700 to buy marijuana. However, Vitalis and Neil never returned to hand over the drugs. When Orlando called the two using a telephone, they said they were robbed and had their car taken. By tracking the number, Orlando was able to find an address in Arlington. Orlando, Demetrius, and Beckley went to the address and saw Vitalis and Neil leaving an apartment and walking to the car they claimed was stolen. Orlando then realized that the two men had lied about being robbed and swindled the group out of their money. Outraged, he was adamant on either receiving what he was owed or getting revenge, saying "I'm not going back to Arkansas until I get my money, my drugs, or some blood on my hands."

Three days later, Webster flew to Texas. He, Orlando, Demetrius, and Beckley then returned to the apartment where they had seen Vitalis and Neil. The group, dressed in camouflage fatigues, brought two pistols, a baseball bat, duct tape, and gasoline. Orlando later said he was planning to light the two men on fire.

Webster and Demetrius knocked on the front door, claiming they were FBI agents. Vitalis and Neil were not there, but their 16-year-old sister, Lisa Rene, was home alone. Rene did not let the men in and called her sister and 911.

When Webster tried to break inside, Lisa told a 911 dispatcher, "They're trying to break down my door! Hurry up!" Webster and Demetrius then went to a glass door on the patio, where they saw Rene talking to the dispatcher. Demetrius smashed the door and Webster rushed inside and dragged Rene to the group's car. The men drove to an apartment that belonged to Hall's sister. Along the way, the group asked Lisa where her brothers were and where their money was. Lisa said her brothers were in Houston and that she knew nothing about the drug deal. At one point, Orlando panicked after seeing a police patrol car, and Webster said he was ready to have a shootout with the police. However, the car passed by, and the group continued driving. When they arrived at the apartment, they got out of the car, forced Rene into Beckley's car, and continued to drive, searching for a place to hide, where they could kill Rene quietly.

As they drove, Orlando asked Rene if she had a boyfriend. When she said no, he raped her and forced her to perform oral sex. After their search was unsuccessful, the group went back to Hall's sister's apartment.

While Orlando stayed behind, Beckley, Demetrius, and Webster drove Rene to Pine Bluff. On the way there, Beckley and Demetrius took turns raping her. After Beckley, Demetrius, and Webster arrived in Arkansas, Holloway gave them money to rent a motel room. To avoid drawing attention, the men had Rene pretend to be Beckley's girlfriend by having them hold hands. Inside the motel room, they tied Rene to a chair and repeatedly raped her.

Beckley admitted to raping Rene while the two were alone, but stopped when she started crying. "It felt like she trusted me", he later testified. Beckley then told Rene not to talk to him or look at him when the others returned.

At one point, officers did a check on Orlando Hall's sister and her husband, the owners of the car used by the group, after noticing it matched the description of the car seen by local residents before the abduction. Finding that the two had no criminal records, the police concluded they had the wrong place and left.

Orlando took a flight back to Arkansas the following day. After he and Holloway arrived at the motel, the two brought Rene into the bathroom for 15 to 20 minutes. After coming out, Orlando told Beckley that she knew too much to be kept alive.

After deciding to kill Rene, Orlando and Webster went to a local park to dig a grave. Rene was brought there after dark but was returned to the motel after the men were unable to find the grave. The following morning, the group drove in two cars with Rene to a different motel. They had become nervous after a close call. Haywood King, a motel security guard who had grown up with Webster in Arkansas, became suspicious of Demetrius after seeing him repeatedly look outside the curtains. King approached the room and asked the men if anything was wrong. They assured him by mentioning Webster. King never saw Rene, who was still tied to a chair in a corner.

While moving Rene to a different motel, the group had another close call. A patrolling officer saw the car carrying Rene, which was driven by Beckley, take an illegal turn. Sanders started flashing his lights and pulled in-between Beckley's car and the other car, which was driven by Orlando. Another police car soon joined in.

Believing it was over, Beckley pulled over. However, Orlando distracted the officers by pulling beside one of them, spinning around, and driving off. This resulted in the car being impounded and Orlando being ticketed for driving without a license. However, he was not arrested.

That night, Orlando, Webster, and Beckley brought Rene, whose face was covered with a mask, back to the park and located the grave. Beckley brought Rene to the grave, reassuring her when she asked if she would die, saying "No, you're not going to die. Keep quiet. You're going to be OK." Orlando then placed a sheet over Rene's head and hit her in the head with a shovel. Beckley tackled Rene after she panicked and tried to run away, getting her to stop screaming by telling her not to resist. Orlando hit Rene a second time with the shovel before handing it to Beckley.

Beckley hit Rene twice in the head with the shovel before handing it to Orlando. Orlando and Webster then beat Rene unconscious with the shovel, after which Webster ordered Beckley to drag Rene into the grave. When Beckley, who had no prior criminal history, said he couldn't do it, Webster gagged Rene, dragged her into the grave, soaked her with gasoline, and shoveled dirt onto her. He then turned around to Beckley and told him, "See, man? That wasn't hard." Rene, who was unconscious but still alive when she was buried, suffocated. Afterward, the group went back to the motel to pick up Demetrius.

Three days after Lisa Rene's death, a warrant was issued for the arrests of Orlando, Demetrius, and Beckley for her kidnapping. Demetrius Hall was quickly arrested, while Orlando Hall and Beckley, surrendered to the police. Webster was arrested the following day. Beckley immediately confessed to the kidnapping, implicating himself, Hall, and another individual. He also agreed to lead Arlington police and the FBI to the body. Orlando said he would talk after he was extradited back to Texas. On October 5, 1994, following his transfer to a jail in Arlington County, Orlando gave a written statement to the FBI and local police, in which he admitted to kidnapping and killing Rene.

== Trials of the murderers ==
Because the group had taken Rene over state lines from Texas to Arkansas, the crime became a federal case under the Federal Kidnapping Act.

On November 4, 1994, in a superseding indictment, Orlando, Demetrius, Webster, Beckley, and Holloway were charged with kidnapping resulting in death, conspiracy to commit kidnapping, traveling in interstate commerce with intent to promote the possession of marijuana with intent to distribute, using a telephone to promote the unlawful activity of extortion, traveling in interstate commerce with intent to promote extortion, and using a firearm during a crime of violence. In February 1995, the government announced it would seek death sentences for Orlando and Webster. The two were the first people to face a possible death sentence under the Federal Death Penalty Act, which became law just 13 days before Rene's murder.

On October 31, 1995, Orlando Hall was convicted of kidnapping resulting in death, conspiracy to commit kidnapping, traveling in interstate commerce with intent to promote the possession of marijuana with intent to distribute, and using a firearm during a crime of violence. At his sentencing hearing, a fellow inmate testified that Hall had bragged about repeatedly raping Rene and told him that, given the opportunity, he would murder Steven Beckley, whom he blamed for the government having a case against him. On November 6, 1995, a federal jury unanimously recommended a death sentence. Orlando was sentenced to death for kidnapping resulting in death. He received a life sentence plus five years for his other convictions.

On June 7, 1996, Bruce Webster was convicted of kidnapping resulting in death, conspiracy to commit kidnapping, and using and carrying a firearm during a crime of violence. On June 20, 1996, a federal jury unanimously recommended a death sentence, Webster was sentenced to death for kidnapping resulting in death. He received a life sentence plus five years for his other convictions.

In exchange for lesser sentences, Demetrius, Beckley, and Holloway all pleaded guilty and testified against Orlando and Webster. Their plea agreements stipulated sentence reductions for providing "substantial assistance". During their joint sentencing hearing on September 9, 1996, U.S. District Judge Terry Means admonished each of them for failing to prevent Rene's death.

Demetrius Hall pleaded guilty to conspiracy to commit kidnapping. He faced up to 33 years in prison. During sentencing, Demetrius's mother asked Means for leniency, noting her other son, Orlando, was already on death row, and she did not want to lose another son. "If you would just have mercy and not take them both away from me, I would appreciate it," Betty Hall said. Demetrius received a 25-year sentence and was released from prison on August 2, 2016.

Steven Beckley pleaded guilty to kidnapping resulting in death. Although the charge generally carries a mandatory life sentence, Means had option to impose a lesser sentence due to Beckley's substantial assistance specification. Beckley received a 30-year sentence. Means reserved his harshest words for him, saying he deserved to be executed and likely would have received a death sentence had he not cooperated. "Mr. Beckley, I can't imagine any more heinous crime than the one you participated in," he said.

On November 12, 2019, Beckley was registered as a sex offender. He will remain on the sex offender registry until November 12, 2041. He was released from prison on April 21, 2020.

Marvin Holloway, who was present at times and financed the crimes, but did not directly participate in the abuse of Rene, pleaded guilty to being an accessory after the fact to kidnapping and interstate transportation in aid of a racketeering enterprise. He received a 15-year sentence. He had faced up to 20 years in prison. Means told Holloway that while he was the least culpable member of the group, he still could have saved Rene. "The hardest part for me to understand, the part that our community cannot forgive, not completely, is the fact that you saw Lisa Rene in that motel room tied up," he said. "You saw Lisa Rene sitting there praying for her life. You did nothing. It's not inappropriate for you to pay a stiff price for so callous an act."

Holloway later appealed his sentence on the grounds that the actions of his co-defendants should not have been attributed to him as well. The court ruled against him, saying he had witnessed Lisa Rene, in his words, "praying for her life" while bound in the motel. They also pointed to Holloway loaning Orlando his car, knowing he was planning to murder Rene. Consequently, the court concluded that Rene's murder should have been foreseeable to Holloway, and he was responsible for "all reasonably foreseeable acts and omissions of others in furtherance of the jointly undertaken criminal activity." Holloway was released from prison on May 2, 2008.

== Execution of Orlando Hall ==
Hall exhausted his appeals on April 16, 2007, but an execution date was not set at the time due to a legal challenge against the lethal injection protocols of the federal death penalty system.

After the federal government resumed executions under William Barr in 2020, Orlando Hall was executed by lethal injection on November 19, 2020, at the United States Penitentiary in Terre Haute, Indiana, at the age of 49. In his final moments, Orlando, who had converted to Islam while on death row, said a prayer before saying "I invite everyone to Islam. Thank you for giving me the opportunity for forgiveness. Thank everyone who's here, my family, my loved ones. Take care of yourselves. Tell my kids I love them." He was pronounced dead at 11:47 P.M. EST.

Days before his execution, Orlando published a written statement in which he protested the U.S. judicial system, but admitted to his role in Rene's murder, saying he had been selfish and had traumatized her family as well as his own.

After Orlando was put to death, Lisa Rene's sister, Pearl Rene, released a statement:

"Today marks the day of a very long and painful chapter in our lives. My family and I are very relieved this is over. We have been dealing with this for 26 years and now we're having to relive the tragic nightmare that our beloved Lisa went through. Ending this painful process will be a major goal for our family. This is only the end of the legal aftermath. The execution of Orlando Hall will never stop the suffering we continue to endure. Please pray for our family as well as his."

== Commutation of Bruce Webster's death sentence ==
In 2019, Bruce Webster's death sentence was overturned after he was found to be intellectually disabled. He had nearly been executed in 2007, but his execution was halted over an injunction in lethal injection protocols. Webster's death sentence was commuted to life imprisonment without the possibility of parole in 2023, and he was transferred to the USP Allenwood in Pennsylvania to serve his life sentence.

== Neil Rene and Stanfield Vitalis ==
Neil Rene and Stanfield Vitalis were initially quiet after their sister's disappearance, refusing to talk to the authorities for three days. Officials considered charging the two with hindering the investigation into their sister's death but ultimately did not do so.

Vitalis was brought in to testify at Orlando Hall's trial. In his testimony, he admitted there was a chance she would still be alive if he had immediately contacted the police. After Orlando Hall was sentenced to death, Vitalis said "I just want to say that justice has been served. But that can't bring my sister back."

In 1995, Neil and Vitalis were indicted on drug possession charges. Neil had lost a package of cocaine in a drug bust, and his need for money to hire a good lawyer is reportedly what prompted him to rip off the gang in the first place. Vitalis pleaded guilty to a marijuana possession charge. Neil was sentenced to five years in prison and Vitalis was sentenced to five years of probation.

In 2012, Neil was arrested on drug trafficking charges in the U.S. Virgin Islands. After hearing of his arrest, Richard Roper, the attorney who prosecuted the killers of Lisa Rene, said "You would have hoped he would have changed his ways, but that's exactly why he got in trouble. He got into things that led to a series of events that led to the murder of his sister, Lisa, who was completely innocent. They sexually assaulted her until they were finished with her and then they killed her. You would have thought he would have learned his lesson from it but evidently he didn't. I just feel sorry for Mrs. Rene having to go through this in light of already losing a daughter."

In 2013, Neil pleaded guilty to one count of conspiracy to possess with intent to distribute a controlled substance and one count of conspiracy to launder monetary instruments. He was sentenced to 151 months in prison. Neil served his sentence at Dallas RRM and was released on February 28, 2023.

== See also ==
- Capital punishment by the United States federal government
- List of people executed by the United States federal government
- List of people executed in the United States in 2020

Executions carried out by the United States federal government
Preceded by Christopher Vialva September 24, 2020	Orlando Hall; November 19, 2020	Succeeded by Brandon Bernard December 10, 2020
Executions carried out in the United States
Preceded by Christopher Vialva – Federal government September 24, 2020	Orlando Hall – Federal government November 19, 2020	Succeeded by Brandon Bernard – Federal government December 10, 2020
