= 2006 Florida's Turnpike carjacking murders =

2006 carjacking and murders of a family in Florida's Turnpike

- Escobedo family
- Location: Florida's Turnpike, United States
- Date: October 13, 2006; 20 years ago
- Attack type: Carjacking and murder
- Weapon: Gun
- Deaths: Jose Escobedo, 28; Yessica Escobedo, 25; Luis Julian Escobedo, 4; Luis Damien Escobedo, 3
- Verdict: Guilty
- Convictions: Federal; Armed carjacking resulting in death Conspiracy; Drug possession Use of firearms
- Sentence: Federal: Sanchez: Death (2009), commuted to life without parole (2024); Troya: Death (2009), commuted to life without parole (2024); Varela: Life without parole (2009); Lopez: 15 years' imprisonment (2009)
- Convicted: Ricardo Sanchez Jr.; Daniel Troya; Danny Varela; Liana Lee Lopez

On October 13, 2006, along Florida's Turnpike, Ricardo Sanchez Jr. and Daniel Troya carried out a deadly carjacking, targeting the Escobedo family. They subsequently shot and killed the entire family of four: parents Jose and Yessica Escobedo, alongside their two young sons, Luis Damien and Luis Julian. The murders were ordered by a third man named Danny Varela to settle a drug debt and to steal drugs from Jose, who was the leader of a drug trafficking syndicate which operated in both Florida and Texas.

Both Sanchez and Troya were tried, convicted and sentenced to death by the United States federal government for multiple counts of firearm and drug offences and carjacking resulting in death. Varela was sentenced to life without parole in federal prison for soliciting the murders of the Escobedo family, and his girlfriend Liana Lopez was also imprisoned for lesser charges related to the murders. Troya and Sanchez were incarcerated on federal death row from 2009 to 2024, before outgoing United States president Joe Biden issued a blanket clemency pardon to 37 out of 40 inmates on federal death row, including the pair, and commuted their federal death sentences to life without parole.

As of 2026, both Troya and Sanchez are still facing state charges of first-degree murder, which could also result in the death penalty in Florida state jurisdiction if found guilty, and the prosecution also expressed their intent to seek the death penalty for the pair.

== Murders ==
On October 13, 2006, a Hispanic family of four, consisting of two adults and two children, were shot and murdered along a highway in an isolated part of Florida's Turnpike.

The victims were 28-year-old Jose "Lou" Escobedo, his 25-year-old wife Yessica Escobedo, and their two sons, three-year-old Luis Damian and four-year-old Luis Julian. Four months before their deaths, the Escobedo family moved from Brownsville, Texas, to Palm Beach County, Florida. Investigations showed that Jose was the leader of a drug trafficking syndicate that operated in both Florida and Texas. On the night before the murders, the family went out of their house, possibly to collect or deliver drugs. Throughout the night, the family was being followed by two members of Jose's gang, 23-year-old Ricardo Sanchez Jr. (born October 19, 1983) and 23-year-old Daniel Troya (born April 22, 1983).

According to the prosecution's contention, both Troya and Sanchez intended to kill Jose and his wife and children, because they wanted to steal the cocaine from Jose and they were desperate to discharge their drug debts. On the early morning hours of October 13, 2006, after trailing the Escobedo family for nine hours, they pulled the Escobedo family over on a secluded section of the turnpike and shot all four family members execution-style. The pair also stole the drugs and money before they left the scene, leaving the bodies of the family behind.

A traveler later found the bodies that same morning. According to autopsy reports, Jose was shot once in his left leg, once above the left eye, and thrice in his lower torso and genitals. Yessica was shot a total of 11 times, consisting of seven wounds on his torso and four to his head and face. Luis Damien was shot five times and Luis Julian sustained six gunshot wounds, including one fatal gunshot injury to his head.

== Federal prosecution and trial ==
=== Arrest and federal charges ===
Two weeks after the carjacking-murders of the Escobedo family, on October 27, 2006, the federal authorities managed to arrest Ricardo Sanchez Jr., Daniel Troya and Danny Varela for the crime. The trio were initially arrested for federal drug charges before their connection to the carjacking case were uncovered through investigations. Varela's girlfriend, Liana Lee Lopez, was arrested alongside the three men for drug offences.

The federal authorities charged both Sanchez and Troya with multiple counts of conspiracy to commit carjacking, armed carjacking resulting in death and using a firearm during a crime of violence. A federal grand jury indicted the pair on these charges in April 2007, and under federal law, armed carjacking resulting in death and using a firearm to commit a violent crime could result in the death penalty upon conviction.

On February 14, 2008, the indictment count was later increased to 11 each for Troya and Sanchez, who originally faced six and seven counts respectively. As for Danny Varela and Liana Lopez, they faced drug conspiracy and weapons charges in connection with the killings.

On February 20, 2008, the federal prosecution announced their intent to seek the death penalty against Sanchez and Troya for the killings.

=== Trial proceedings and conviction ===
On January 4, 2009, the federal jury selection began in West Palm Beach for the upcoming trial of Daniel Troya, Ricardo Sanchez Jr., Danny Verala and Liana Lopez.

On January 25, 2009, after the conclusion of jury selection, the trial of the four defendants officially began at a West Palm Beach federal courthouse. In their opening statements, the prosecution described that the murders of the Escobedo family were drug related, and two of the defendants, Troya and Sanchez, trailed after the family in order to kill them for their drugs. If found guilty, both Troya and Sanchez faced a possible federal death sentence, while both Varela and Lopez faced the maximum sentence of life imprisonment.

On March 5, 2009, all the four defendants were found guilty by the jury. Sanchez and Troya were each convicted of 11 counts of armed carjacking resulting in deaths, conspiracy, weapons counts and drug offenses. Varela was convicted of nine counts of drug conspiracy and weapons offences, while Lopez was convicted of four counts of firearm offences and drug possession.

=== Sentencings of Troya and Sanchez ===
Daniel Troya

The sentencing trial of both Sanchez and Troya began on March 26, 2009, before the same federal jury. During the hearing, the prosecution argued for the death penalty for both men, stating that was the only appropriate punishment for the pair due to the brutality of the crimes and the violent criminal pasts of the duo. The defence, however, asked for mercy from the jury and court. Sanchez's counsel submitted that their client grew up in an abusive family background and his father was often drunk and violent, and also shot Sanchez's mother in the face even while she was pregnant. They additionally cited that Sanchez was unable to read above a third-grade level due to low IQ. Troya's counsel argued that their client's life suffered a downward spiral since age 12, and he was greatly traumatized by the death of a friend outside his middle school and even cradled the dying boy in his arms.

On March 31, 2009, the jury voted to sentence the pair to death for the murders of the two children. However, in the same decision, the pair were spared the death sentence for the murders of the parents.

On May 13, 2009, both Troya and Sanchez were formally sentenced to death by U.S. District Judge Daniel T. K. Hurley, therefore becoming the first defendants from Florida to receive the federal death penalty since 1988. When delivering his verdict, Judge Hurley described the Escobedo family murders as "shocking, appalling and outrageous", and he additionally labelled one of the men, Troya, as "enormously dangerous" for his blatant disregard for human life. Apart from the two death sentences, the pair were also sentenced to five life sentences without parole for the murders of the parents and armed carjacking, plus more than 25 years for Troya and more than 40 years for Sanchez on drug and firearm possession charges.

Prior to his sentencing, Troya made a public apology in court for his actions. He first addressed the victims and their surviving kin, and apologized for his crimes. He also apologized to the prosecution for previously hurling a water bottle at them when the jury recommended the death penalty in the past hearing. However, Sanchez continued to maintain that he was innocent of the murders and offered an apology towards the victims' surviving relatives for the tragedy that befell them.

=== Sentencings of Varela and Lopez ===
Danny Varela

On May 15, 2009, in separate court hearings, for their respective convictions, Lopez was sentenced to the minimum term of 15 years in prison while Varela was sentenced to double terms of life without parole plus more than 60 years. During Varela's sentencing, District Judge Hurley rejected Varela's claims of innocence and remarked that Varela shared a similar degree of culpability as both Troya and Sanchez by soliciting the murders of the Escobedos even though he did not directly kill the victims and was not there at the crime scene. District Judge Hurley, who also oversaw the sentencing of Lopez, determined that despite her knowledge that her boyfriend's triad was armed, violent and capable of murder, Lopez was indeed unaware of the murders and never participated in them.

In the aftermath, both Lopez and Varela filed appeals against their convictions and sentences. The 11th Circuit Court of Appeals rejected their appeals and upheld the convictions and sentences on August 16, 2011. Varela would later appeal to reduce his life sentence, but it was denied in 2020.

After her sentencing, Lopez remained in prison for the following decade until she was released on September 27, 2019.

As of 2026, Varela is serving his life term at the Federal Correctional Institution, Ray Brook (FCI Ray Brook).

=== Convictions of Juan Gutierrez and Kevin Vetere ===
Juan C. "Flaco" Gutierrez, Sanchez's cousin, was found guilty and sentenced to 18 years in prison for conspiracy to possess with intent to distribute crack cocaine. A sixth man, Kevin Vetere, was also sentenced to 12 years in prison. Gutierrez was released from prison on January 14, 2022. Vetere's profile was not listed inside the federal inmate database.

== Federal death row and commutation ==
After they were condemned to die, from 2009 to 2024, Daniel Troya and Ricardo Sanchez Jr. were incarcerated at the federal death row unit at the United States Penitentiary, Terre Haute (USP Terre Haute), Indiana, home to the federal government's execution facility.

Both Troya and Sanchez filed appeals to challenge their death sentences in November 2010. On October 2, 2013, the 11th Circuit Court of Appeals dismissed the appeals of both Sanchez and Troya and affirmed their death sentences and convictions.

After the loss of their appeals, the men's cases were expected to be forwarded to the U.S. Supreme Court for appellate review. On May 4, 2015, the U.S. Supreme Court rejected both men's petitions for writs of certiorari and upheld their death sentences.

On December 23, 2024, before the end of his term, outgoing United States president Joe Biden issued clemency pardons to 37 out of the 40 inmates held on federal death row. Both Troya and Sanchez were included on the clemency recipient list, and their death sentences were commuted to life imprisonment without the possibility of parole.

As of 2026, both Sanchez and Troya remains imprisoned at the USP Terre Haute.

== State murder charges ==
On May 23, 2025, six months after the commutation of Troya's and Sanchez's federal death sentences, Sheriff Richard Del Toro and State Attorney Thomas Bakkedahl announced that the state of Florida would reopen the 2006 Turnpike carjacking murder case in light of former President Joe Biden's decision to spare the pair from execution, and they sought to uphold the "highest level of accountability" for the duo due to the "calculated and unspeakably violent" murders of the Escobedo family. Additionally, they also sought to prosecute the men for first-degree murder charges, which carries the death penalty under Florida state law.

On May 27, 2025, the state authorities officially announced their intent to seek the death penalty against Troya and Sanchez for state charges of first-degree murder. Under Florida state law, a defendant could face both state and federal prosecutions for the same crime under the dual sovereignty doctrine.

By December 2025, Sanchez and Troya were among four former federal death row inmates facing state murder charges that could lead to new death sentences. The other two were Thomas Steven Sanders, who was convicted of the interstate kidnapping and murder of a 12-year-old girl, and Brandon Council, who killed two women during a bank robbery in South Carolina.

== See also ==
- Capital punishment in Florida
- Capital punishment by the United States federal government
