= Terry R. Means =

American judge (born 1948)

Senior Judge of the United States District Court for the Northern District of Texas
- Incumbent
- Assumed office July 3, 2013

Judge of the United States District Court for the Northern District of Texas
- In office November 5, 1991 – July 3, 2013
- Appointed by: George H. W. Bush
- Preceded by: David Owen Belew Jr.
- Succeeded by: Ada Brown

Personal details
- Born: 1948 (age 77–78) Roswell, New Mexico, U.S.
- Education: Southern Methodist University (BA, JD)

Terry R. Means (born 1948) is a senior United States district judge of the United States District Court for the Northern District of Texas.

== Education and career ==
Means was born in Roswell, New Mexico. He received a Bachelor of Arts degree from Southern Methodist University in 1971 and a Juris Doctor from Southern Methodist University School of Law in 1974. He was in private practice in Corsicana, Texas from 1974 to 1989. He was a Justice, Texas Court of Appeals, 10th Appellate District, Waco, from 1989 to 1991.

=== Federal judicial service ===
Means was nominated by President George H. W. Bush on July 24, 1991, to a seat vacated by Judge David Owen Belew Jr. He was confirmed by the United States Senate on October 31, 1991, and received his commission on November 5, 1991. He was the judge in the trials of the men responsible for the murder of Lisa Rene. Means took senior status on July 3, 2013.

== Sources ==
Legal offices
Preceded by David Owen Belew Jr.	Judge of the United States District Court for the Northern District of Texas; 1991–2013	Succeeded by Ada Brown
