= FEAR (militia group) =

American terrorist group

- Leaders: Isaac Aguigui; Michael Burnett; Anthony Peden; Christopher Salmon
- Dates active: 2011 – September 11, 2012
- Active regions: (United States) Georgia and Washington
- Ideology: Anti-establishment; Anarchism
- Size: 4–11

The FEAR militia (Forever Enduring, Always Ready) was an American militia group of between four and eleven individuals that the State of Georgia alleged in 2012 to have planned to destroy a dam and poison apple orchards in Washington State, set off explosives in Forsyth Park in Savannah, Georgia, and assassinate President Barack Obama. Four of the individuals charged were soldiers stationed at Fort Stewart, Georgia. The group killed two people in an attempt to prevent them from revealing their plans to the public. The group used the Army to recruit militia members, who wore distinctive tattoos that resemble an alpha and omega symbol.

== Murder of Deirdre Aguigui and formation of the FEAR network ==
On July 17, 2011, Deirdre Aguigui, a 23-year-old US Army sergeant based at Fort Stewart, Georgia, died, while approximately 7 months pregnant. Although her husband Isaac Aguigui would later be convicted of her murder, it was initially believed the cause of death was a blood clot (she had previously suffered an embolism while on active service in Iraq). Isaac Aguigui, an army private, received $100,000 in death benefits and an additional $400,000 from a life insurance policy; part of the funds were later used to arm the group. He was moved into single men's accommodation after her death and developed an unhealthy addictive lifestyle as well as resentment at the military, and purchased several firearms. (His firearms purchase was reported and investigated by the FBI; the FBI reported it to military authorities who decided against action.) Their relationship had been troubled, and Aguigui had sexually abused and coerced her.

Aguigui came from a military family and became involved in right-wing politics in his teens.

Although he acknowledged Barack Obama's ability as a speaker, he wrote that he disapproved of the President's "socialist policies" and objected to his campaign playing the "race card." "This country is so focused on black vs. white that they forget how many other races there are out there," he complained.

After Deirdre's death, Aguigui began befriending other disgruntled soldiers, targeting those who were in trouble or emotionally vulnerable.

Aguigui was influenced by an article in the video-gaming magazine Game Informer, treating it as a kind of manifesto. The article was about a game called Rainbow 6 Patriots, in which an élite counterterrorist unit, Team Rainbow, fights a coalition of domestic militias called the True Patriots. The article opened with the words "Americans are angry". He was also obsessed with the movies Sucker Punch, V for Vendetta and Rampage.

Aguigui named the group FEAR, structured as a militia with no rank structure. He said: "I believe most Americans share my beliefs; they're just afraid to show it. The only way to overcome all fear is to become something everyone else fears." He referred to key members of the group as the Family, and envisaged an élite platoon called 666. The group learnt how to make bombs, and made elaborate plans for spectacular terror incidents, and planned to overthrow the government on July 17, 2031, the twentieth anniversary of Deirdre's death.

Aguigui came to the attention of the military authorities multiple times for suspected crimes and misdemeanours but was allowed to continue; he bribed and extorted higher ranking soldiers into involvement in the group's activities. Internal conflicts and suspicions affected the group, including a belief that one member, Michael Roark, had stolen from it.

== Murders of Michael Roark and Tiffany York ==
On December 6, 2011, the bodies of 19-year-old Michael Roark and his girlfriend, 17-year-old Tiffany York, were found by two fishermen near a rural road in southeastern Georgia. On December 10, four soldiers based in nearby Fort Stewart were arrested in connection with the killings: Private Christopher Salmon, Sergeant Anthony Peden, Pvt. Isaac Aguigui, and Private First Class Michael Burnett. The soldiers ranged in age from 19 (Aguigui) to 26 (Burnett). Two days later, Salmon and Peden were charged in Long County court with malice murder. Aguigui and Burnett were charged with being a party to murder. All four were denied bond. According to Salmon, Roark was killed for taking money from the group's bank account and out of suspicion that Roark was going to expose the group to police.

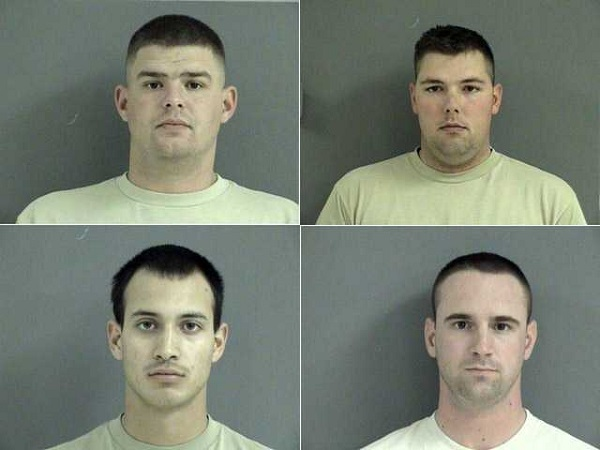
FEAR's leaders, clockwise from top-left: Michael Burnett, Anthony Peden, Christopher Salmon, Isaac Aguigui

In August 2012, Burnett agreed to plead guilty to a lesser charge of manslaughter in exchange for testifying against Salmon, Peden, and Aguigui.

On September 11, 2012, five more men (Christopher Jenderseck, Timothy Martin Joiner, Adam Dearman, Randall Blake Dearman and Anthony Garner) were indicted on various counts of tampering with evidence, burglary, theft, criminal damage to property, and violations of the Street Gang Terrorism and Prevention Act in connection with the militia. On October 15, Jenderseck, a former Army medic, pleaded guilty to destruction of evidence of the murders (specifically, a mobile phone, spent shotgun shells, and blood-spattered clothes), and received seven years of probation in exchange for agreeing to testify against the remaining defendants and any future defendants in the case.

=== Verdicts and sentences ===
In July 2013, ringleader Aguigui pleaded guilty to malice murder, felony murder, criminal gang activity, aggravated assault, and using a firearm while committing a felony. He was sentenced to life in prison without the possibility of parole. Salmon pleaded guilty to malice murder in April 2014 and accepted a sentence of life in prison with no chance of parole. Salmon's wife, Heather Salmon, was sentenced to 20 years in prison after pleading guilty to voluntary manslaughter. Heather was in the National Guard for two years and was in the army from 2006 to 2010. Prosecutors said she wanted her children to grow up to kill on the militia's behalf.

In March 2014, Aguigui was convicted by a military court of murdering his pregnant wife, Deirdre Aguigui, and their unborn child in July 2011. He was sentenced to a second life term with no possibility of parole, and is currently serving his sentence at the United States Penitentiary in Terre Haute, Indiana.

In May 2014, Peden pleaded guilty to malice murder and received a life sentence with the possibility of parole after 30 years. Leniency was granted on the grounds that he'd served in combat in both Iraq and Afghanistan, resulting in post-traumatic stress disorder. Peden was deployed twice to Afghanistan and once to Iraq between 2006 and 2011. His attorney, Burt Baker, said Peden suffered from multiple brain injuries and PTSD.

In February 2016, Burnett was sentenced to 8 years in prison and 40 years of court supervision. He was released on December 9, 2019. Additional defendants pled to lesser charges of illegally purchasing guns, theft, and selling drugs in order to purchase guns and land to set up a compound in Washington state.
