= Hardie Boys =

Hardie Boys may refer to:

- Michael Hardie Boys (1931–2023), New Zealand lawyer, jurist and governor-general
- Reginald Hardie Boys (1903–1970), New Zealand lawyer and judge

== See also ==
- The Hardy Boys, series of detective/adventure books
- Hardy Boys (criminal duo)
- Hardy Boyz, a professional wrestling tag team
