= David Owen Belew Jr. =

American judge (1920–2001)

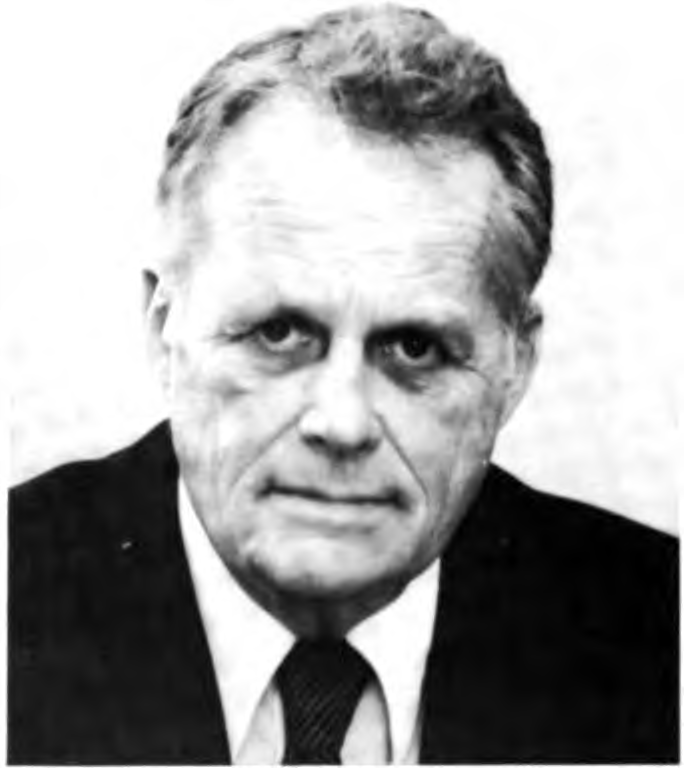

Senior Judge of the United States District Court for the Northern District of Texas
- In office May 7, 1990 – November 21, 2001

Judge of the United States District Court for the Northern District of Texas
- In office April 26, 1979 – May 7, 1990
- Appointed by: Jimmy Carter
- Preceded by: Seat established by 92 Stat. 1629
- Succeeded by: Terry R. Means

Personal details
- Born: David Owen Belew Jr. March 27, 1920 Fort Worth, Texas, U.S.
- Died: November 21, 2001 (aged 81) Fort Worth, Texas, U.S.
- Education: University of Texas at Austin (BA); University of Texas School of Law (LLB)

David Owen Belew Jr. (March 27, 1920 – November 21, 2001) was a United States district judge of the United States District Court for the Northern District of Texas.

== Education and career ==
Born in Fort Worth, Texas, Belew was in the United States Army, 90th Infantry Division from 1942 to 1946, achieving the rank of captain. He received a Bachelor of Arts degree from the University of Texas at Austin in 1946 and a Bachelor of Laws from the University of Texas School of Law in 1948. He was an Assistant United States Attorney of the Northern District of Texas from 1949 to 1952, and was then in private practice in Fort Worth from 1953 to 1979.

== Federal judicial service ==
On February 9, 1979, Belew was nominated by President Jimmy Carter to a new seat on the United States District Court for the Northern District of Texas created by 92 Stat. 1629. He was confirmed by the United States Senate on April 24, 1979, and received his commission on April 26, 1979. He assumed senior status on May 7, 1990. Belew served in that capacity until his death, on November 21, 2001, in Fort Worth.

== Notable case ==
During 1988 to 1989 Judge Belew presided over the longest aviation trial in American history that lasted fourteen months and resulted from the wind shear related crash of Delta Flight 191 at Dallas/Ft. Worth Airport on August 2, 1985. The trial featured the first use of computer generated graphics as substantive evidence in federal court and earned the American Bar Association Journal cover story “The Final Minutes of Delta 191.”

== Sources ==
Legal offices
Preceded by Seat established by 92 Stat. 1629	Judge of the United States District Court for the Northern District of Texas; 1979–1990	Succeeded by Terry R. Means
