= Larry Ray (criminal) =

American sex trafficker (born 1959)

- Born: Lawrence Grecco; November 16, 1959 (age 67); Brooklyn, New York, U.S.
- Other names: Lawrence V. Ray, Larry Grecco
- Children: 2 daughters, Talia Ray and Ava Ray
- Status: in prison
- Convictions: sex trafficking, extortion, forced labor, conspiracy, money laundering, and other offenses (April 6, 2022)
- Penalty: 60 years in prison
- Accomplice: Isabella Pollok

Details
- Victims: 7, including Claudia Drury
- Span of crimes: 2010–2020
- Country: United States
- States: New York, New Jersey, North Carolina
- Date apprehended: February 2020
- Imprisoned at: United States Penitentiary, Terre Haute

Lawrence Grecco (born November 16, 1959), known as Larry Ray, is an American criminal who was convicted of sex trafficking, extortion, forced labor, conspiracy, money laundering, and other offenses. In 2023, he was sentenced to 60 years in prison. He had founded what was described as a "sex cult" at Sarah Lawrence College, after moving in to his daughter's dormitory there when he was 50 years of age.

== Early life ==
Ray was born as Lawrence Grecco in 1959, in Bay Ridge, Brooklyn, New York, in the United States. He grew up in Brooklyn and in New Jersey. He later lived in Yonkers, New York, on the Upper East Side of Manhattan, in Pinehurst, North Carolina, and as of 2020 in Piscataway, New Jersey.

After graduating high school he served in the United States Air Force for 19 days, was dishonorably discharged, and then switched to other employment. In the 1980s he was a partner in and ran a bar in Scotch Plains, New Jersey, called the Club Malibu and JJ Rockers.

In the early 1990s, he founded a commercial insurance brokerage firm, that helped insure customers for construction projects and the like. Through this role, he met Joseph Polito, a reputed mobster and member of the Gambino crime family who owned and was president of a company named U.S. Bridge of New York (USBNY) which was based in Queens, New York, and agreed to help the company obtain insurance for a project. At some point in the mid-1990s, Ray said that someone from the mob attached to the company was trying to kill him, and Bernard Kerik helped him contact the FBI.

He asserted that he worked for a United States intelligence agency in Kosovo in 1999, but there is no record of him ever being an intelligence agent for the U.S. A NATO official downplayed his role, saying: "I remember him being around. He was connected and may have made some calls for us, as many other people did at the time."

In the late 1990s, Ray was an informant for the FBI. His job was to inform the Bureau about a scheme involving Gambino crime family capo Eddie Garafola, but his efforts failed as he focused instead on using his role as an informant to conceal his own involvement in the scheme.

=== Connections with Bernard Kerik and Frank DiTommaso ===
In 1995, Ray met and then became close friends with Bernard Kerik, a New York Police Department detective. The two men worked out together and rode motorcycles. Kerik was at one point Rudolph Giuliani's bodyguard and driver. In 1995, Kerik was promoted to becoming the director of the New York City Department of Correction's investigations Division. In 1997, at Kerik's request Ray arranged a New York City Hall meeting between Mayor Rudolph Giuliani and Soviet leader Mikhail Gorbachev, after befriending Gorbachev's interpreter, Pavel Palazhchenko. One month later, Giuliani named Kerik the Commissioner of the New York City Department of Correction, a position that Kerik held from 1998 to 2000. Ray donated $7,000 to help pay for Kerik's November 1998 wedding and reception, and was the best man at Kerik's wedding. Shortly after, Kerik helped Ray obtain a job as security director with a construction company run by Frank DiTommaso and his brother known as Interstate Industrial Corporation, where a portion of Ray's responsibility was to assist the business in obtaining a license from city regulators, as the business faced allegations that it was tied to organized crime. Ray worked for Interstate from December 1998 until March 2000.

In 2000, Ray and Kerik had a falling out, around the time that Ray was indicted for racketeering, and Ray began to act as a cooperating witness with prosecutors who were investigating Kerik, and whose investigation ultimately led to Kerik being convicted and imprisoned. Kerik was the Police Commissioner of New York City from 2000 to 2001. He pleaded guilty in 2009 in the Southern District of New York to federal felony charges for tax fraud, making false statements, and his efforts on behalf of Interstate. In 2010 he was sentenced to four years in federal prison, of which he served three years, and in 2020 he obtained a presidential pardon from President Donald Trump.

Ray also testified against DiTommaso in a 2012 perjury trial; in September 2015, DiTommaso happened upon Ray in the lobby of the Hudson Hotel, and pummeled him. In 2019 Kerik said: “Larry Ray is a psychotic con man who has victimized every friend he’s ever had. It’s been close to 20 years since I last heard from him, yet his reign of terror continues.”

== Crimes ==
=== Securities fraud ===
In March 2000, as Ray was living in Warren, New Jersey, he was indicted with others in Brooklyn, New York, for his role in a federal racketeering and stock fraud scheme. The scheme involved the pumping and dumping of stocks by mobsters and stockbrokers, cheating investors out of $40 million between 1993 and 1996. As part of the fraud scheme he was charged with attempting to pay a $100,000 bribe to a bond brokerage firm executive on Garafola's behalf to ensure that USBNY would be granted a bond so that it could act as a general contractor on large construction projects.

In 2003 he pled guilty to conspiracy to commit securities fraud. On April 9, 2003, he was sentenced to nine months of home confinement, and five years of probation. The judge accused Ray of “manipulating” the court.

In 2006, Ray's then-girlfriend accused him of pinning her down, and putting his hand over her nose and mouth; as a result, he was arrested. She later withdrew her complaint, and the case was dismissed. His arrest was one reason federal prosecutors argued in 2007 that Ray had violated his probation. U.S. Marshals tracked him to his friend's apartment on East 93rd Street where he was with his daughter Talia, pinned him to the ground during which they broke his arm, and handcuffed him. One marshal recalled hearing Talia scream: “Police corruption! This is because of Mayor Rudy Giuliani and Bernard Kerik!”

=== Abduction ===
In 2004, his then-wife, Teresa Ray, whom he had married in 1988, filed for divorce, and alleged that he had hit her. The parents had a long-term child custody dispute over their daughters Talia Ray and Ava Ray, and a psychological examiner's notes from the time said that Ray was "able to manipulate and control almost any situation in which he finds himself, including a psychological interview with a forensic examiner, no matter how experienced that examiner may be. Mr. Ray is very good at what he does … [He] can be utterly charming, and one can be disarmed by his childlike simplicity and smile. But Mr. Ray is no child; he is a calculating, manipulative and hostile man."

Ray was subsequently charged with interference with child custody, bail jumping, and contempt of court after he in 2005 refused to turn his daughter Talia over to a maternal relative for a visit. He pleaded guilty in 2010, a violation of his parole, and served six months in Northern State Prison in New Jersey on the charges, until late 2010.

=== Sex trafficking and extortion ===
Following his release from the New Jersey prison, in September 2010 when he was 50 years of age Ray moved into and resided in the on-campus student housing dormitory apartment of his daughter, Talia Ray, at the elite liberal arts Sarah Lawrence College in Yonkers, New York, a suburb just north of New York City. At the time, Talia was a sophomore at the college, and lived in the dorm with seven other sophomore students. The college later told New York magazine that it was not aware that he had been living on campus.

While there, Ray started a sex cult in which he presented himself to students as a former US Marine with training in psychological operations, as well as past work with the Central Intelligence Agency. At first Ray ingratiated himself with his daughter's friends, cooking dinners and ordering in delivery, and presenting himself as a father figure. He told the students fabricated stories about his decorated history as an international CIA agent, how he recovered Stinger missiles from the black market and engineered a cease-fire in Kosovo, and lauded the values of the Marine Corps. He then began doing “therapy sessions” and "sex education" with his daughter's roommates, initially college sophomores, counseling them, and convincing them he could help with their psychological problems. He learned intimate details of the students' private lives and their mental health struggles, saying it was so that he could help them, and alienated several of them from their parents.

Ray, after gaining the trust of the students, then subjected his daughter's friends to interrogations that lasted hours at a time and led to verbal and physical abuse. Over time, using threats, coercion, and eventually threatening some of them with knives and a hammer, he persuaded them to confess to crimes that they had not committed, including damaging his apartment and property and him and his family, using tactics such as sleep deprivation, psychological and sexual humiliation, verbal abuse, physical violence, and threats of legal action, and then extorted $1 million from five of his victims, with some victims withdrawing hundreds of thousands of dollars from their parents’ savings accounts at his direction. He controlled where they went, to whom they spoke, what they ate, and when they slept.

In the summer of 2011, he and some of the group of Sarah Lawrence students, including Santos Rosario and his two sisters (Yalitza, a Columbia University student, and Felicia), Daniel Levin, Claudia Drury, Isabella Pollok, and Talia moved into a one-bedroom condo apartment owned by Ray's old friend Lee Chen, in Apartment 5E at 300 East 93rd Street on the Upper East Side in nearby Manhattan, New York City. Ray, Talia, and Isabella shared a bed in the bedroom, and the others slept on inflatable mattresses or couches. He managed to convince Santos Rosario's sister Felicia, a Harvard University and Columbia Medical School graduate, to leave her forensic psychiatry medical residency program in Los Angeles, California and join them in the Manhattan apartment. Ray forced the female roommates to have sex with him and with others, saying it would assist them in moving past their childhood traumas, videotaped the encounters, and threatened to post the tapes and to send them to the young women's parents. It took six years for Lee Chen to evict Ray from his apartment.

In 2013, four of Ray's victims graduated from Sarah Lawrence College. In that same year, he brought Yalitza and Felicia Rosario, and later also Claudia Drury and Isabella Pollok, to his stepfather's property in Pinehurst, North Carolina, where he restricted their access to food (locking the refrigerator), was physically violent with them, berated them for imaginary infractions, accused them of poisoning him, and threatened them. There, he used them as forced manual laborers without pay on his stepfather's property, with him telling them it was so that they could repay money he claimed that they owed him.

In 2014, he coerced former student Claudia Drury into working at a sex club. From 2014 to 2018, he forced Drury into prostitution, trafficked her, and took from her hundreds of thousands of dollars she made by selling sex to strangers. She worked under a name that was a combination of the names of Ray's daughters. Ray was also physically violent with her, and once almost suffocated her inside a Midtown Manhattan hotel. By 2014, Santos, Isabella, Yalitza, and Claudia had all attempted suicide; Iban Goicoechea, who also lived with him, died by suicide.

In 2016, Ray, Felicia Rosario, and Isabella Pollok, who was 19 years old when she fell under Ray's influence and then cut off ties with her family and followed him up and down the Eastern Seaboard for a decade, moved into the home of one of Ray's friends in New Jersey.

The story about Larry Ray first broke in New York magazine in April 2019. His daughter Talia and two other former students denied the claims against Ray in the article.

== Legal proceedings ==
In February 2020, Ray was arrested in New Jersey and charged by federal prosecutors in Manhattan with sex trafficking, extortion, forced labor, conspiracy, money laundering (of $1 million that he obtained from the victims), and other related offenses, following eight years of alleged transgressions with Sarah Lawrence College students and former students, including subjecting his victims to sexual and psychological manipulation and physical abuse, and torturing them mentally and physically.

The lead assistant U.S. Attorney in his prosecution, Danielle Sassoon, disclosed to the Manhattan federal court at his bail hearing that Ray had been arrested while in bed with one of his victims; bail was denied. Defense attorneys argued Ray, who had been diagnosed with narcissistic personality disorder and histrionic personality disorder, was influenced by his psychological problems.

In 2022, he was tried for nearly a month in the U.S. District Court for the Southern District of New York in Manhattan on 15 counts, including sex trafficking, extortion, racketeering conspiracy and violent crime in aid of racketeering, forced labor, and money laundering. During his trial, several survivors including Claudia Drury testified against him. Ray was convicted by the jury after four hours of deliberation on all counts on April 6, 2022. On January 20, 2023, he was sentenced by Judge Lewis Liman to 60 years in prison, and a lifetime of supervised release. Summing up the case, Judge Liman said: "It was sadism, pure and simple." As of February 2024, he was imprisoned at the United States Penitentiary, Terre Haute, in Indiana.

In 2021, Isabella Pollok, who had been with Ray for a decade, was charged as Ray's co-conspirator in the sex trafficking and extortion case. In 2022 she pleaded guilty to conspiracy to commit money laundering. On February 22, 2023, Pollok was sentenced to 4.5 years in prison for money laundering. According to the Bureau of Prisons, she was released from custody on July 21, 2025.

Ray is scheduled to be released on March 29, 2071, when he will be 111 years old.

== Aftermath ==
These events were dramatized in the 2024 Lifetime television movie Devil on Campus: The Larry Ray Story, with Billy Zane playing Ray. A Hulu docuseries was also made, Stolen Youth: Inside the Cult at Sarah Lawrence (2023). The two-act play Runts, written by Melvin Jules Bukiet and loosely based on the events, opened in May 2023 at the Teatro Latea on the Lower East Side of Manhattan. The cult has also been the subject of the Wondery podcast network's Law&Crime episode "Devil in the Dorm" podcast.

== See also ==
- List of inmates at the United States Penitentiary, Terre Haute
