= Ada Brown (judge) =

American federal judge (born 1974)

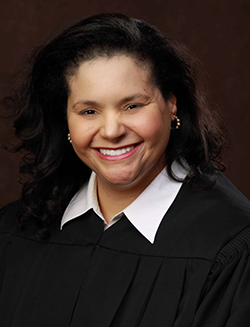

Judge of the United States District Court for the Northern District of Texas
- Incumbent
- Assumed office September 13, 2019
- Appointed by: Donald Trump
- Preceded by: Terry R. Means

Associate Justice of the Fifth Court of Appeals of Texas
- In office September 3, 2013 – September 13, 2019
- Appointed by: Rick Perry
- Succeeded by: David Evans

Personal details
- Born: Ada Elene Brown; November 8, 1974 (age 51) Oklahoma City, Oklahoma, U.S.
- Party: Republican
- Education: Spelman College (BA); Emory University (JD); Duke University (LLM)

Ada Elene Brown (born November 8, 1974) is an American lawyer and jurist serving as a United States district judge of the U.S. District Court for the Northern District of Texas. She was appointed in 2019 by President Donald Trump. She is a former trial judge of the Dallas County courts and a former Justice of the Fifth Court of Appeals of Texas. She was the first Native American and African-American woman federal judge nominated by Trump and confirmed by the Senate. Since October 2026, Brown has been temporarily suspended from deciding cases based on a formal finding that she likely suffers a "mental condition that interferes with her ability to perform the responsibilities of her office."

== Early life and education ==
Brown was born on November 8, 1974, in Oklahoma City, Oklahoma. She graduated as a valedictorian of her high school class, where she was elected both sophomore and junior class president. She graduated from Spelman College in 1996 with a Bachelor of Arts, magna cum laude, and from the Emory University School of Law in 1999 with a Juris Doctor. Later in her career, she earned a Master of Laws from Duke University School of Law.

== Legal career ==
=== Criminal law practice ===
Brown began her career practicing criminal law. She served as a trial prosecutor at the Dallas County District Attorney's Office, where she tried over 100 jury trials to verdict as lead prosecutor. During this time, she became a felony trial prosecutor and prosecuted murders, rapes, kidnappings, and other felony crimes. She was known for taking on complex, technical cases. She specialized in prosecuting felony internet crimes against children. In 2005, Brown was one of 2.5% of attorneys under 40 selected by Super Lawyers Magazine as a Rising Star in criminal prosecution. Brown left the Dallas County District Attorney’s office to become a district court judge.

=== Civil law practice ===
After leaving the trial bench, Brown practiced as a civil litigator at McKool Smith in Dallas, Texas, where her practice focused on commercial litigation and patent infringement matters. She was an attorney in cases involving million dollar judgments.

=== Law enforcement commissioner ===
Brown was appointed by Texas Governor Rick Perry to serve as a Commissioner for the Texas Commission on Law Enforcement Officer Standards and Education, the regulatory agency responsible for licensing all police officers in Texas. Perry later appointed Brown as a Commissioner for the Texas Department of Public Safety, one of 5 people responsible for overseeing a $2.3 billion biennial budget and 10,000+ employees, including the Texas Ranger Division as well as all state troopers in the Texas Highway Patrol.

== Judicial career ==
=== State judicial service ===
Brown was appointed by Rick Perry to be a trial judge of the Dallas County Criminal District Court from 2005 to 2007, before departing for private practice.

On September 3, 2013, Perry appointed her to serve as a Justice on the Fifth Court of Appeals of Texas. Brown served there for six years, during which time she heard over 1,500 civil and criminal appeals. She resigned from the Fifth Court of Appeals of Texas upon her appointment to the United States District Court for the Northern District of Texas.

=== Federal judicial service ===
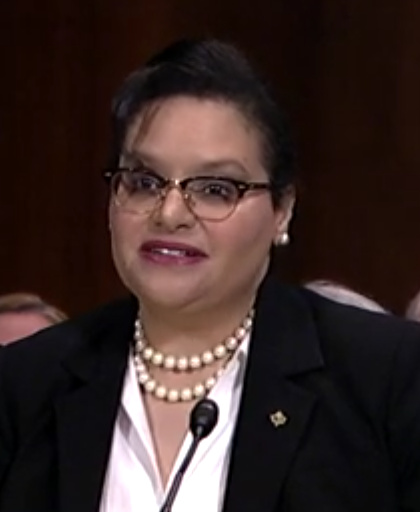
Brown testifies to the Senate Judiciary Committee during her nomination hearing to be a federal judge on April 30, 2019.

On March 15, 2019, President Donald Trump announced his intent to nominate Brown to serve as a United States district judge for the United States District Court for the Northern District of Texas. On March 26, 2019, her nomination was sent to the Senate. Ada Brown was nominated to the seat vacated by Judge Terry R. Means, who assumed senior status on July 3, 2013. On April 30, 2019, a hearing on her nomination was held before the Senate Judiciary Committee. On June 13, 2019, her nomination was reported out of committee by an 18–4 vote. On July 30, 2019, the United States Senate invoked cloture on her nomination by a 79–9 vote. On September 11, 2019, her nomination was confirmed by an 80–13 vote. She received her judicial commission on September 13, 2019.

In 2026, two judicial misconduct complaints were filed against Brown, including one by Jennifer Walker Elrod, Chief Judge of the United States Court of Appeals for the Fifth Circuit. A judicial investigation committee subsequently accused Brown of mishandling the cases in front of her, making racial insults to other judges and court staff, and abandoning her role; the committee went on to find there was a "reasonable basis" to determine that Brown was suffering from a mental health condition, and recommended she be temporarily stripped of her docket while a full misconduct proceeding plays out.

=== Ryan, LLC v. FTC ===
On August 21, 2024, Brown ruled in Ryan, LLC v. FTC that a proposed rule by the Federal Trade Commission to ban noncompete agreements was unlawful. The ban, which was set to take effect in September 2024, was ruled as "arbitrary and capricious", and an overstepping of the FTC's legal authority.

== Memberships ==
Brown is a member of the Daughters of the American Revolution, the Mayflower Society, and the Federalist Society. Brown joined Alpha Kappa Alpha sorority while at Spelman College. She is also a member of the Choctaw Nation of Oklahoma.

== See also ==
- List of African-American federal judges
- List of African-American jurists
- List of Native American jurists

Legal offices
Preceded by Terry R. Means	Judge of the United States District Court for the Northern District of Texas; 2019–present	Incumbent
