= Len Davis =

American convicted drug trafficker and former New Orleans police officer

- Davis during his time in the NOPD (1990s)
- Born: August 6, 1964 (age 62); Chicago, Illinois, U.S.
- Other names: RoboCop; Desire Projects Terrorist
- Occupations: Former police officer, New Orleans Police Department
- Status: Incarcerated
- Convictions: Deprivation of rights under color of law resulting in death Conspiracy to deprive rights Conspiracy to distribute cocaine Use of a firearm during a drug trafficking crime
- Penalty: Death; commuted to life imprisonment without possibility of parole (2024)

Details
- Victims: Rondell Santinac, 19; Kim Groves, 32
- Date: August 22, 1994; October 14, 1994
- State: Louisiana
- Location: New Orleans
- Date apprehended: 1994
- Imprisoned at: ADX Florence

Len Davis (born August 6, 1964) is a former New Orleans police officer. He was convicted in federal court of depriving civil rights through murder by conspiring with an assassin to kill a local resident who had reported him for abuse of power after seeing him beat a 17-year-old boy whom he had mistaken as the suspect in the shooting of a police officer. He was also convicted on drug smuggling charges. Davis became the first on-duty police officer to be sentenced to death for federal civil rights violations. His sentence was commuted to life in prison without possibility of parole by departing President Joe Biden in December 2024.

Years after his conviction, it was found that Davis had framed three innocent teenagers, who were sent to prison for a combined total of 84 years, for a murder that he himself is now believed to have committed. Davis allegedly also framed two other men, who had served a combined total of 56 years in prison for murders they say they did not commit. They have since been released from prison after pleading guilty to lesser charges. One of the two men, Dwayne LeBlanc, had ironically been the original suspect whom Davis had been searching for.

== Police career ==
Davis was known in the community as "RoboCop" because of his large size and as the "Desire projects terrorist" due to his aggressive policing style. He had been suspended six times and received 20 complaints between 1987 and 1992, while subsequently receiving the department's Medal of Merit in 1993.

"He's got an internal affairs jacket as thick as a telephone book," one NOPD officer said to the New Orleans Times-Picayune, referring to Davis' folder of complaints against him. "But supervisors have swept his dirt under the rug for so long that it's coming back to haunt them."

In 1994, an FBI sting caught Davis enforcing a protection racket upon the city's cocaine dealers. Davis had extorted protection money from a drug dealer who was an FBI informant. Nine other police officers, including two who would later testify against Davis, were later indicted for being part of a criminal conspiracy with Davis. Twenty additional New Orleans police officers were also implicated in the scheme, but the investigation had to be aborted due to the murder of Kim Groves. Davis would later be convicted of additional drug-related charges, while the other officers pleaded guilty.

== Murder of Kim Groves ==
In 1994, Davis and another officer, Sammie Williams, beat and pistol-whipped 17-year-old Nathan Norwood in New Orleans, mistaking him for Dwayne LeBlanc, the suspect in a police officer's shooting. Kim Groves, a 32-year-old local resident and mother of three young children, witnessed the assault and filed a complaint with the New Orleans Police Department. Davis was tipped off about the complaint by another officer and then conspired with a local drug dealer, Paul Hardy, to kill Groves. Hardy shot and killed her on October 14, 1994, less than one day after she filed the complaint. He was driven away by Steve Jackson. A fourth man, Damon Causey, participated in the planning of the murder and later hid the murder weapon, a 9mm pistol.

== Trial and conviction ==
Davis was convicted in 1996 on two federal civil rights charges for directing Hardy to murder Groves and for witness tampering. Davis was initially sentenced to death on April 26, 1996. In December 1996, Davis was sentenced to life in prison plus five years for his involvement in a cocaine ring in which other NOPD officers had participated.

Neither Davis nor Sammie Williams were ever prosecuted for the initial beating of Nathan Norwood. Along with Steve Jackson, Williams agreed to become a star witness for the prosecution against Davis and Hardy in exchange for leniency in other pending criminal cases against him. On August 26, 1998, Williams was sentenced to five years in prison after pleading guilty to conspiracy to commit drug smuggling and using a firearm during a drug smuggling crime. The judge called Williams a disgrace, but thanked him for helping convict Davis and Hardy.

The Fifth Circuit reversed Davis's death sentence when his conviction for witness tampering was thrown out. A subsequent jury imposed a death sentence, and Davis was formally sentenced to death again on October 27, 2005. Davis is currently imprisoned at the U.S. Penitentiary Administrative Maximum Facility in Florence, Colorado, also known as "ADX".

Hardy was convicted of conspiracy to violate Groves' civil rights and of witness tampering. The witness tampering conviction would be later overturned. He was initially sentenced to death, but in 2011, his sentence was commuted to life when he was found by a judge to be intellectually disabled.

Causey was convicted of federal conspiracy charges and of violating Groves' civil rights. He was sentenced to life imprisonment after rejecting a plea bargain that would have given him six to nine years in prison. His conviction was upheld on appeal.

== Aftermath and later developments ==
In 2018, the city of New Orleans settled a lawsuit with Groves' three children in the sum of $1.5 million. Davis lost his final appeal in October 2021.

In October 2022, three men, Bernell Juluke Jr., Leroy Nelson, and Kunta Gable, wrongfully convicted of the August 22, 1994, murder of 19-year-old Rondell Santinac, based on false testimony from Davis, were released after 28 years of incarceration. Davis has been linked to Santinac's murder as well. In December 2022, another man, Sherman Singleton, who was convicted of the August 8, 1990, murder of Bruce Vappie based on false testimony from Davis, was released from prison after 32 years after pleading guilty to manslaughter. In 2022, Dwayne LeBlanc, the man whom Davis had originally been searching for, was released from prison after 24 years after his convictions for second degree murder of the August 27, 1994, slaying of Richard Borden and attempted first degree murder were overturned and he pleaded guilty to lesser charges. LeBlanc said he was living in California, over 2,000 miles away, when the murder occurred.

On December 23, 2024, Davis's federal death sentence was commuted to life in prison after outgoing President Joe Biden granted sentence commutations to 37 of the 40 inmates on federal death row. A week later, Davis and fellow former death row inmate Shannon Agofsky filed a motion to block the commutation, as courts examine death penalty cases more closely for errors during appeals. The motion was rejected.

Davis was transferred from USP Terre Haute to ADX Florence, a supermax facility in Fremont County, Colorado, on November 20, 2025.

== In popular culture ==
The Len Davis case & aftermath has been the subject of numerous true crime documentary shows, such as:

- A&E Network's The FBI Files; season 2, episode 8 (21st episode overall) "Shattered Shield"
- A&E Network's City Confidential; season 1, episode 7 "New Orleans: Betrayal In The Big Easy"
- Vice TV's Betraying The Badge; season 1, episode 3 "Shattered Shield"

== See also ==
- List of inmates at the United States Penitentiary, Terre Haute
- List of killings by law enforcement officers in the United States prior to 2009
- Antoinette Frank - another New Orleans police officer sentenced to death
