= Erin Sharma =

American prison officer

- Born: Erin J. Donald; April 24, 1976 (age 50); United States
- Occupation: Correction officer (former)
- Spouse: Rajesh (m. 1999)
- Children: 1
- Status: Incarcerated
- Convictions: Deprivation of rights under color of law resulting in death Conspiracy to deprive rights
- Penalty: Life imprisonment

Erin J. Sharma (née Donald, born April 24, 1976) is a former corrections officer for the United States Federal Bureau of Prisons. She was sentenced to life in federal prison in 2009 for causing the beating death of an inmate at the maximum security unit of the Coleman Federal Correctional Complex near Coleman, Florida. Prosecutors said that after inmate Richard Delano grabbed her arm through a food slot and bruised it, she and another guard (later revealed to be her supervisor) arranged for him to be assigned to share a cell with a notoriously violent inmate, knowing Delano would be harmed.

== Early life ==
Sharma was the daughter of an Army soldier, and moved around frequently during her childhood. She graduated high school a year early, and began working as a corrections officer in Washington in 1997. She married Rajesh "Roger" Sharma, a fellow corrections officer, in 1999. They moved together to Edgefield, South Carolina; where Erin got a job as a corrections officer at FCI Edgefield. When they gave birth to a daughter, they decided to move to Florida to be closer to Erin's mother.

== Inmate death ==
On February 3, 2005, Richard Allen Delano, a convicted fentanyl dealer who was serving a 15-year sentence, grabbed Sharma's arm through a food slot, bruising it. She then said to him, "You're a dead man." She received minor first aid treatment and was sent home for the rest of the day. On March 1, Delano, who had a reputation as a snitch, was transferred into a cell with John Javilo "Animal" McCullah, a convicted murderer who had assaulted all of his previous cellmates. Prior to the transfer, witnesses overheard Sharma encouraging McCullah to attack Delano, but to do so on a day when she was not at work.

On March 4, while Sharma was on a three-day vacation, Delano was beaten into a coma. He died 13 days later. Sharma was charged with two felony counts of violating Delano's civil rights under color of law for conspiring to have him killed and with violating his Constitutional right not to be subjected to cruel and unusual punishment.

== Trial ==
At the federal trial in Orlando, the prosecution showed that Sharma and an alleged corrections officer co-conspirator knew that McCullah, who had been placed on special single-cell hold status, was likely to assault Delano. In his opening statement, federal prosecutor Douglas Kern told the jury that putting Delano into a cell with McCullah "was like putting a sheep in a cage with a wolf". Kern described McCullah as a "hugely violent, racist gang member inmate" who was a member of the Aryan Brotherhood prison gang. He described Sharma as the "puppet master", and McCullah as her puppet.

FBI Agent James Raby testified about three unrecorded interviews conducted with Sharma following the assault. Raby said Sharma had acknowledged knowing Delano's reputation as a snitch, knowing that McCullah was notoriously violent, and knowing that the shared cell arrangement would "invariably" lead to an assault. He said Sharma had expressed regret about the assault. Various witnesses described Sharma as a vengeful officer who played favorites and hated snitches.

When her own turn to testify came, Sharma denied having made the statements that Raby testified to, and denied telling him that she felt "haunted" by the assault. She said her threats were clearly jokes, and that she "treated those inmates almost like they were my kids." On July 29, 2009, the jury found Sharma guilty of both charges.

== Sentence ==
On October 26, 2009, Senior U.S. District Judge Patricia C. Fawsett sentenced the 33-year-old Sharma to life in federal prison. Rejecting pleas for leniency from Sharma's family, Fawsett said Delano's death was "an expectable result" of the transfer, and that she "took advantage of her superior position" to gain revenge on Delano. Therefore, Delano's death amounted to second-degree murder. Fawsett also found that Sharma had perjured herself on the witness stand when she disputed Raby's testimony, saying that it ran counter to "the overwhelming evidence" of Sharma's involvement in the crime. The perjury finding qualified Sharma for a two-level obstruction of justice upward departure from the federal sentencing guidelines. Sharma's attorney said he would file an appeal. On August 24, 2010, the Eleventh Circuit of the US Court of Appeals affirmed Sharma's convictions and life sentence.

The location where Sharma is serving her sentence is something of a mystery. According to the Federal Bureau of Prisons website, Sharma, BOP Register #05026-748, is assigned to the Residential Reentry Management Field Office in Phoenix, Arizona; she was previously assigned to the RRM field office in Sacramento, California and then Kansas City, Missouri. However, RRMs are not prison facilities, but are merely an administrative designation for federal inmates who are serving their sentences in halfway houses, state and county correctional facilities, or who are on house arrest. Since she is serving a life sentence, this designation almost certainly means that she was originally held in a California state prison before being transferred to a Missouri state prison. However, a search of the Missouri Department of Corrections inmate database does not reveal anyone being held under her name, and an earlier search of the California Department of Corrections database did not turn up anyone under her name either. This suggests she is being held under an alias, which would not be unusual for a former corrections officer. A posting on the web site paperdollspenpals.com indicates she is or has been at the Iowa Correctional Institution for Women in Mitchellville, IA.

Following the fatal assault, McCullah was temporarily transferred to the United States Penitentiary, Florence ADX, the federal supermax prison in Colorado. After this he was transferred to the Federal Correctional Institution, Victorville, a medium security facility in California. Currently he is serving his sentence in the Special Management Unit at the USP Tucson, Arizona.

== Second officer ==
During Sharma's trial, Raby testified that Sharma's supervisor, Michael Kennedy, proposed that Delano be transferred into a cell with McCullah, believing that McCullah would give Delano "a good [butt] kicking and head-knocking". On November 2, 2009, the U.S. Justice Department announced that a grand jury had indicted Kennedy on one count of conspiring to violate Delano's federal civil rights and one count of violating his civil rights by arranging for another inmate to assault him.

On July 8, 2010, Kennedy was found guilty of both civil rights counts. The jury did not reach a unanimous finding that the violations resulted in Delano's death. As such, Kennedy avoided a life term and was instead sentenced to nine years in federal prison. The government had sought the maximum sentence of 20 years.
