= Hardy Boys (criminal duo) =

Criminal duo

- Founded by: Wayne & Paul Hardy
- Founding location: New Orleans
- Years active: 1988–1994
- Territory: Florida Projects (white-side)
- Ethnicity: Mostly African-American
- Criminal activities: Racketeering, extortion, money laundering, murder, robbery, drug trafficking
- Rivals: Poonie Crew (Black-side)

The Hardy Boys was a criminal duo composed of brothers Wayne and Paul "Cool" Hardy. The brothers were implicated in a host of crimes including the slaying of Kim Groves in 1994. The slaying gained national media coverage due to the involvement of crooked officer Len Davis, nicknamed the "Desire Terrorist." Davis ordered multiple hits, leading up to his conviction in 1996. The conviction resulted in an FBI sting "Operation Shattered Shield," which became one of the most high-profile busts of a crooked cop in modern history. In 1990, video maker and artist Dawn DeDeaux published documentaries titled "Urban Warrior Scrapbook" and "Drive By Shooting," documenting the violent life of Wayne and brother Paul Hardy during the height of their violent run.

== Overview ==
The Hardy Boys organization began sometime in the late-1980s with brothers Paul "Cool" Hardy and younger Wayne Hardy; both men were raised in New Orleans. The brothers recruited family members and close associates to traffic illegal narcotics from Los Angeles to New Orleans. Multiple officers from NOPD's 5th District including Len Davis, were paid off in exchange for classified information. This made the organization invisible and powerful over other drug organizations at that time.

=== Timeline of events and crimes committed ===
1988

- September 18 - At 6:21 p.m., in the 2300 block of Erato Street, Paul Hardy, riding in a 1982 Cutlass with brother Wayne, pulled up alongside another vehicle and shot through the door of the vehicle, with an assault rifle killing the passenger, Jerome Andrews.

1989

- July 29 - At 2:45 a.m., in the 2600 block of Congress Street, Wayne and Paul Hardy and Mitchell White went on a shooting spree that resulted in the death of Michael Handy and wounded four others in the Florida Projects. The victims were transported to the emergency room of a local hospital and were shot at as they were being wheeled inside the hospital for treatment. In September, 1989 Paul, Wayne and White were indicted by a grand jury for the death of Handy. In 1990 there were found innocent of first-degree murder and released.

1990

- September - Wayne Hardy is wanted for robbery after snatching a women's earrings off at Skate City Roller Rink.

1992

- August 1 - Ulsiee White is shot to death in the 2800 block of Amelia street near the intersection of Clara Street. Authorities arrived 6 p.m. and found White dead on the sidewalk with gunshot wound to the head. Wayne Hardy was ruled as a suspect and booked with White's murder. He was later released.
- August 30 - Joe Strawder is shot to death in the 600 block of N Elm Street in Metairie, Louisiana. Authorities later charged Lionel Hardy and Wayne Harder with the Strawder slaying. According to police Lionel Hardy ordered Wayne Hardy to kill Strawder for money he owed. Lionel and Wayne were both indicted for the murder in 1993.

1994

- March - Turf war between Dan "Poonie" Bright's crew and the Hardy Boys began in the Florida Projects.
- April 22 - at approximately 2:10 a.m. in front of 1416 S. Johnson street, Paul Hardy had Corey Richardson murdered in order to keep him quiet after Corey Richardson, pursuant to Paul Hardy's orders. Richardson, was shot twice in the head and once through the neck.
- September 30 - at approximately 7:45 p.m., at 2515 Alvar Street, Paul Hardy murdered Carlos Adams, shooting him multiple times. Adams died at the scene.
- October 6 - Paul Hardy asked Len Davis, for the names of two individuals who had allegedly stolen his Jeep Cherokee, with telling Len Davis that, "I'm going to kill them bitches."
- October 12 - at approximately 12:08 a.m., in the 2500 block of Mazant Street Shawn King and Troy Watts were murdered by Paul Hardy who used 223. assault weapon and 9mm pistol.
- October 13 - Davis paged Paul Hardy and ordered a hit on Kim Groves, who witnessed him pistol whipping her nephew. Groves filed a complaint against Davis with the NOPD's internal affairs office, alleging that Davis engaged in police brutality. Davis learned about the complaint a day before. Davis arranged to meet Hardy and Damon Causey at the police station to view photos of homicide cases. Davis then drove to Groves' neighborhood in their NOPD patrol car and searched for her. Davis and his partner Sammie Williams picked up Hardy at his home and drove back to Groves' neighborhood so that Hardy could walk around. At approximately 10:00 p.m., Davis and Williams spotted Groves near her home. Davis paged Hardy. When Hardy called Davis back, Davis described Groves' appearance. Hardy replied he was “on the way.” Williams's shift ended at that point, and he left Davis with the patrol car. About 45 minutes later, Davis called Hardy again and described Groves' clothing and location in detail. Hardy, along with Causey and a driver, went to Groves' neighborhood in the Lower 9th Ward. Hardy then shot Groves in the head, killing her.
- October 20 - Paul Hardy and Damon Causey planned to conduct a shooting spree on the "black side" of the Florida Housing Projects which was controlled by the rival Poonie Crew. Paul Hardy and Causey contacted Len Davis, in order to confirm that no legitimate police officers were patrolling the area in which Paul Hardy intended to commit the shooting.
- October 29 - Paul Hardy informed Len Davis he was going to kill Poonie and his associates for harassing his girlfriend.
- November 7 - Paul Hardy asked Len Davis for the addresses of the mother and grandmother of Dan "Poonie" Bright in order to plan a shooting against Bright.
- December 5 - Paul Hardy, Damon Causey, and Davis is arrested for the murder of Kim Groves. Davis would later be charged with ordering 13 killings of witnesses who filed complaints against him. Federal authorities suspends officers recruited by Davis.

1996

- January 18 - Wayne and a woman are both shot to death in a car on S Carrollton and Tulane avenue.
- April 26 - Paul Hardy and Davis are convicted and receive death sentences for the murder of Kim Groves.
