= Capital punishment by the United States federal government =

Legal penalty in the United States

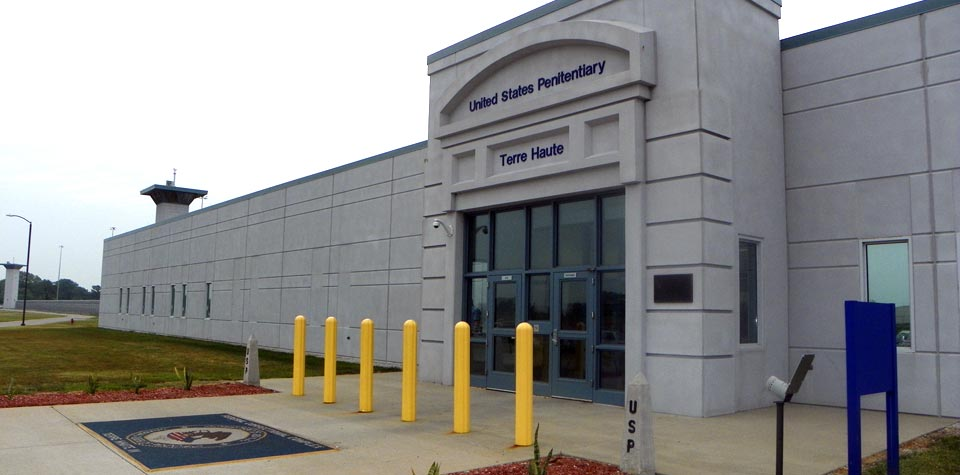
United States Penitentiary, Terre Haute houses the federal death row for men and the federal execution chamber.

Capital punishment is a legal punishment under the criminal justice system of the United States federal government. It is the most serious punishment that can be imposed under federal law. The serious crimes that warrant this punishment include treason, espionage, murder, large-scale drug trafficking, or attempted murder of a witness, juror, or court officer in certain cases.

The federal government imposes and carries out a small minority of the death sentences in the U.S., with the vast majority being applied by state governments. The Federal Bureau of Prisons (BOP) manages the housing and execution of federal death row prisoners.

In practice, the federal government rarely carries out executions. As a result of the Supreme Court opinion in Furman v. Georgia in 1972, the federal death penalty was suspended from law until its reinstatement by Congress in 1988. No federal executions occurred between 1972 and 2001. From 2001 to 2003, three people were executed by the federal government. No further federal executions occurred from March 18, 2003, up to July 14, 2020, when they resumed under President Donald Trump, during which 13 death row inmates were executed in the last 6 months of his first presidency.

Since January 16, 2021, no further executions have been performed. On July 1, 2021, U.S. Attorney General Merrick Garland placed a moratorium on all federal executions pending review of policy and procedures. On February 5, 2025, Attorney General Pam Bondi lifted the moratorium and directed the Justice Department to take steps to strengthen the death penalty, consistent with an executive order signed by the newly re-inaugurated President Trump on January 20.

On December 23, 2024, outgoing President Joe Biden issued a blanket commutation of death row prisoners not convicted of terrorism or hate-motivated mass murder. As a result, there are three prisoners (Note: Dylann Roof, Robert Gregory Bowers, and Dzhokhar Tsarnaev) remaining on federal death row.

== History ==
The Crimes Act of 1790 defined some capital offenses: treason, murder, robbery, piracy, mutiny, hostility against the United States, counterfeiting, and aiding the escape of a capital prisoner. The first federal execution was that of Thomas Bird on June 25, 1790, for committing "murder on the high seas", after he murdered his captain while serving on a slave ship.

The use of the death penalty in U.S. territories was handled by federal judges and the U.S. Marshal Service.

Historically, members of the U.S. Marshals Service conducted all federal executions. Pre-Furman executions by the federal government were normally carried out within the prison system of the state in which the crime was committed. Only in cases where the crime was committed in a territory, the District of Columbia, or a state without the death penalty was it the norm for the court to designate the state in which the death penalty would be carried out, as the federal prison system did not have an execution facility.

The last pre-Furman federal execution took place on March 15, 1963, when Victor Feguer was executed for kidnapping and murder, after President John F. Kennedy denied clemency.

Capital punishment was halted in 1972 after the Furman v. Georgia decision but was once again permitted under the Gregg v. Georgia decision in 1976.

In the late 1980s, Senator Alfonse D'Amato, from New York State, sponsored a bill to make certain federal drug crimes eligible for the death penalty as he was frustrated by the lack of a death penalty in his home state. The Anti-Drug Abuse Act of 1988 restored the death penalty under federal law for drug offenses and some types of murder. President Bill Clinton signed the Violent Crime Control and Law Enforcement Act, expanding the federal death penalty in 1994. In response to the Oklahoma City bombing, the Antiterrorism and Effective Death Penalty Act of 1996 was passed in 1996. Federal Correctional Complex, Terre Haute became the only federal prison to execute people and one of only three prisons to hold federally condemned people.

The federal death penalty applies even in areas without a state death penalty since federal criminal law is the same for the entire country and is enforced by federal courts, rather than by state courts. From 1988 to October 2019, federal juries gave death sentences to eight convicts in places without a state death penalty when the crime was committed and tried.

The federal death penalty is also applicable for any crime involving the murder of a United States national outside of the United States, if the crime is intended to, as per 18 USC 2332, "coerce, intimidate, or retaliate against a government or a civilian population."

Timothy McVeigh was executed on June 11, 2001, for his involvement in the Oklahoma City bombing, where 168 people were killed. The first federal execution since 1963, it was broadcast on a closed circuit-television to survivors and victims' families.

=== Since 2019 ===
On July 25, 2019, U.S. attorney general William Barr announced that the federal government would resume executions using pentobarbital, rather than the three-drug cocktail previously used. The Bureau of Prisons' acting director then scheduled 5 convicted death row inmates to be executed in December 2019 and January 2020. However, on November 20, 2019, U.S. District Judge Tanya Chutkan issued a preliminary injunction preventing the resumption of federal executions, because the plaintiffs in the case argued that the use of pentobarbital alone violated the Federal Death Penalty Act of 1994. The injunction was upheld by the U.S. Court of Appeals for the District of Columbia Circuit and, on December 6, 2019, by the United States Supreme Court, but it told the court of appeals to rule on the case "with appropriate dispatch". Justices Alito, Gorsuch, and Kavanaugh wrote that they believed the government would ultimately win the case and that they would have set a 60-day deadline for the court of appeals to finalize it. In January 2020, the Justice Department argued to the appeals court that when Congress declared that federal executions must be carried out "in the manner prescribed by the state" where inmates were convicted, it was referring to the general method of execution allowed in states, such as lethal injection, rather than the specific drugs to be used.

In July 2020, the first federal execution under the presidency of Donald Trump was carried out, the first after a 17-year hiatus. Overall, thirteen federal prisoners were executed between July 2020 and January 2021, including Lisa Montgomery, the first woman executed by the federal government in 67 years.

President Trump oversaw more federal executions than any president in the preceding 120 years.

The Boston Marathon bomber Dzhokhar Tsarnaev was sentenced to death on June 24, 2015, for his role in the terrorist attack of the 2013 Boston Marathon bombings, but that sentence was vacated by a federal appeals court on July 31, 2020. Following a Supreme Court decision, the sentence was reinstated on March 4, 2022.

Most of the federal death row inmates are imprisoned at United States Penitentiary, Terre Haute (USP Terre Haute) in Terre Haute, Indiana. As of 2024, due to security concerns, death row inmate Dzhokhar Tsarnaev is held at the United States Penitentiary Florence Administrative Maximum Facility (ADX Florence) in Florence, Colorado. Federal Medical Center, Carswell (FMC Carswell), located at Naval Air Station Joint Reserve Base Fort Worth just west of Fort Worth, Texas, has previously housed women who were on federal death row. Forty people have had their sentences commuted to life in prison: one by President Bill Clinton in 2001, two in 2017 by President Barack Obama, who commuted one death sentence handed down by a civilian federal district court and another issued by a military court-martial and 37 by President Joe Biden in December 2024.

The inmates who did not receive President Biden's commutations were Dylann Roof, Robert Gregory Bowers, and Dzhokhar Tsarnaev. Two death row inmates, Shannon Agofsky and Len Davis, asked a U.S. district court to reject their commutations because, according to CNN and The Indian Express, they believe that being commuted would hinder their efforts to prove their innocence. It is not yet known whether or not the inmates will have their commutations rejected, though the Justice Department and DPIC director Robin Maher have argued that the president's commutation power is absolute, thus preventing rejection of commutations.

== Legal process ==
=== Sentencing ===
In the federal system, the final decision to seek the death penalty rests with the United States Attorney General. This differs from most states, where local prosecutors have the final say with no involvement from the state attorney general.

The sentence is decided by the jury and must be unanimous. Sentences of death handed down by a jury cannot be rejected by the judge. In case of a hung jury during the penalty phase of the trial, a sentence of life imprisonment without the possibility of early release must be issued, even if a single juror opposed death (there is no retrial).

=== Appeals and clemency ===
While death row inmates sentenced by state governments may appeal to both state courts and federal courts, federal death row inmates have to appeal directly to federal courts.

The power of clemency and pardon belongs to the President of the United States.

== Method ==
The method of execution of federal prisoners for offenses under the Violent Crime Control and Law Enforcement Act of 1994 is that of the state in which the conviction took place. If the state has no death penalty, the judge must select a state with the death penalty for carrying out the execution.

The federal government has a facility and regulations only for executions by lethal injection, but the United States Code allows U.S. Marshals to use state facilities and employees for federal executions.

Federal executions typically occur at the United States Penitentiary, Terre Haute, in Terre Haute, Indiana. The method of execution currently used at USP Terre Haute is lethal injection. On April 24, 2026, the Department of Justice issued a report directing the Bureau of Prisons to expand its execution protocols to include methods like firing squad, electrocution, and lethal gas, and directed the Bureau to consider expanding the facility to accommodate the new methods.

Pre-Furman federal executions were often conducted by hanging or electrocution, and less commonly by cyanide gas.

== Presidential assassins ==
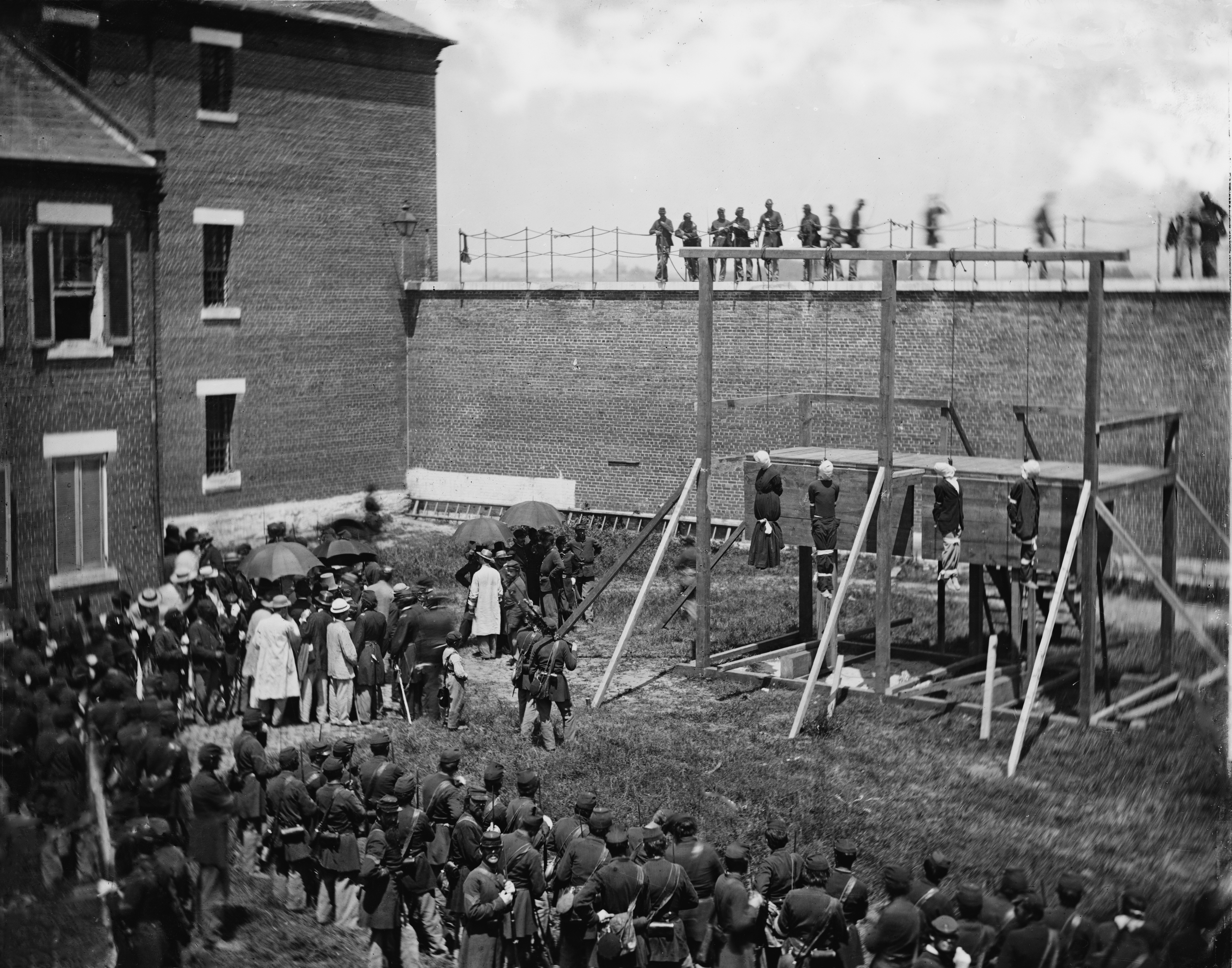
Execution of George Atzerodt, David Herold, Lewis Powell, and Mary Surratt on July 7, 1865, at Fort McNair in Washington, D.C.

Presidential assassins
Executed convict	Date of execution	Method	President assassinated	Under president
George Atzerodt	July 7, 1865	Hanging	Abraham Lincoln	Andrew Johnson
David Herold	July 7, 1865	Hanging	Abraham Lincoln	Andrew Johnson
Lewis Powell	July 7, 1865	Hanging	Abraham Lincoln	Andrew Johnson
Mary Surratt	July 7, 1865	Hanging	Abraham Lincoln	Andrew Johnson
Charles J. Guiteau	June 30, 1882	Hanging	James A. Garfield	Chester A. Arthur
Leon Czolgosz	October 29, 1901	Electrocution	William McKinley	Theodore Roosevelt

Four presidents of the United States have been slain by assassins while in office. The assassins of Abraham Lincoln were tried by a military commission based on the military nature of the conspiracy. Charles Guiteau's trial was held in a civilian court of the District of Columbia where the assassination of James Garfield happened.

The assassin of William McKinley, Leon Czolgosz, was tried and executed for murder by New York state authorities. The accused assassin of John F. Kennedy, Lee Harvey Oswald, would presumably have been tried for murder by Texas state authorities had he not been killed two days later by Jack Ruby in the basement of the Dallas Municipal Building (then Dallas Police Department headquarters) while being transferred to the county jail. (Ruby himself was initially tried and convicted of murder in a Texas state court, but that was overturned by the Texas Court of Criminal Appeals and he died before he could be retried.) Only after Kennedy's death was it made a federal crime to murder the president of the United States.

== Military executions ==
Capital punishment in the United States military has a long history and has been a sentencing option for varied crimes since the founding of the United States. Between 1942 and 1961, a total of 160 soldiers convicted of criminal offences are known to have been executed by the US military, most of them during World War II. This figure does not include individuals executed by the US military for varied contraventions of the laws of war during wartime. Of the 160 known executions of American soldiers between 1942 and 1961, 141 were carried out between 1942 and January 1946. Between 1954 and 1961, ten individuals were executed under terms of the Uniform Code of Military Justice, the last being U.S. Army Private John A. Bennett, executed on April 13, 1961, for child rape and attempted murder. As of 2026, no military executions have been carried out since 1961. The last soldier executed for the purely military offence of desertion was Private Eddie Slovik, who was executed on January 31, 1945.

For offenses related to their service, members of the military are usually tried in courts-martial that apply the Uniform Code of Military Justice (UCMJ) and may order the death penalty as a possible sentence for some crimes. Military commissions may also be established in the field in time of war to expeditiously try and sentence enemy military personnel under the UCMJ for certain offenses. Controversially, the Military Commissions Act of 2009 allows military commissions to try and sentence "'alien unprivileged enemy belligerent[s]'" accused of having "'engaged in'" or "'purposefully and materially support[ed] hostilities'" against the United States or its allies, without the benefit of some UCMJ protections. In a military commission trial, the death penalty may only be imposed in case of a unanimous verdict and sentencing decision.

== See also ==
- List of people executed by the United States federal government
- List of people executed by the United States military
- List of death row inmates held by the United States federal government
- Crime in the United States
- Law of the United States
