= United States Penitentiary, Terre Haute =

High-security federal prison in Indiana, US

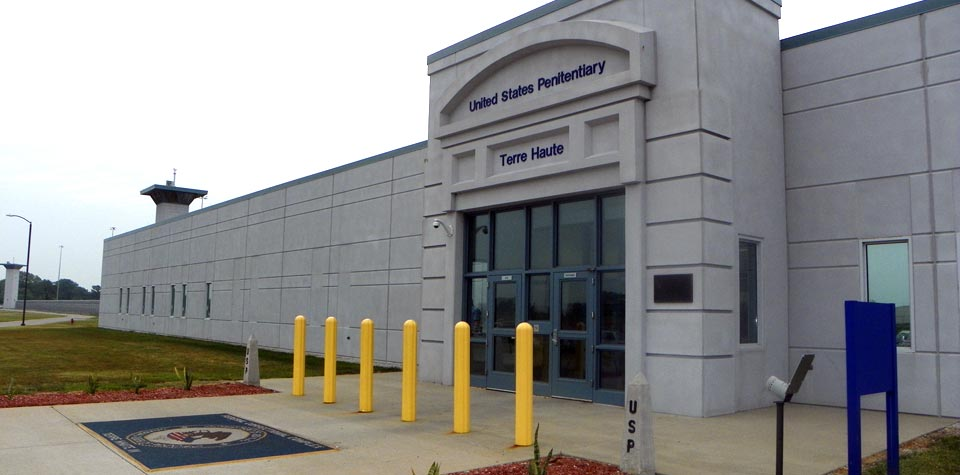

- Location in Indiana United States Penitentiary, Terre Haute (the United States)
- Location: Vigo County, Indiana, U.S.; 39.4126°N 87.4542°W
- Status: Operational
- Security class: High-security (with minimum-security prison camp)
- Population: 1,171 (September 2023)
- Opened: Original facility: 1940; Current facility: 2005
- Managed by: Federal Bureau of Prisons

The United States Penitentiary, Terre Haute (USP Terre Haute) is a high-security United States federal prison for male inmates in Terre Haute, Indiana. It is part of the Federal Correctional Complex, Terre Haute (FCC Terre Haute) and is operated by the Federal Bureau of Prisons, a division of the United States Department of Justice. USP Terre Haute houses a Special Confinement Unit for male federal inmates who have been sentenced to death as well as the federal execution chamber. Two of the three inmates awaiting execution by the U.S. federal government are housed in USP Terre Haute. FCC Terre Haute is located in the city of Terre Haute, 70 miles (110 km) west of Indianapolis.

== History ==
A new United States penitentiary was authorized by President of the United States Franklin D. Roosevelt in 1938 and established in Terre Haute, Indiana, in 1940 on 1,126 acres (4.56 km^{2}) of land. The opening of the prison in this city was partly due to heavy promotion by Terre Haute's Chamber of Commerce, which eventually went on to raise $50,000 to pay for the property on which the prison was built. The residents of Terre Haute initially embraced the prison due to the impression that it would provide jobs to local residents in addition to helping Terre Haute's economy while only housing non-violent offenders. E.B. Swope was the prison's first warden.

The U.S. Public Works Administration issued a $3 million grant to pay for construction of USP Terre Haute in 1938. Construction cost of the institution at the time that it was built was $2,150,000. The architectural design of the prison is a modified telephone pole design with all housing and other facilities opening onto a long central corridor. It was the first penitentiary for adult felons ever to be constructed without a wall. In 2004, the new USP was built on adjoining property, with the old penitentiary becoming the medium-security Federal Correctional Institution, Terre Haute.

USP Terre Haute was one of the first federal prisons to emphasize rehabilitation by providing psychological and psychiatric treatment, referring to prisoners by names as opposed to numbers, and allowing prisoners to talk during meals instead of eating in silence. The institution initiated the use of the word "inmate" as opposed to other less-appealing labels such as "convict" or "criminal". It also became one of the first federal prisons to implement educational programs in prisons with sessions devoted to improving the inmates' skills in reading, writing, maths, as well as trades.

Camp 5, part of the Guantanamo Bay detention camps, on the island of Cuba, is reported to have been based on the design of USP Terre Haute.

== Facility ==
USP Terre Haute is a Care Level 3 facility, which means that any inmate sent to Terre Haute who has serious health problems that are not major enough to warrant hospitalization is sent to the USP. This facility is also a tobacco-free institution. This part of the FCC contains six housing units. One of the six housing units is a faith-based unit that can house 125 inmates. When the inmates are not working, they are partaking in faith-based activities. All of the inmates in the USP are allotted seven visit-days a month and 300 minutes of telephone time, which they have to use in increments of 15 minutes or less. The inmates housed here can work at UNICOR, which is a prison industry that makes towels and other accessories for the military. Inmates employed here earn an average of $6.50 to $7.50 a day and some can make up to $12 a day if they are paid by piece as opposed to by the hour.

== Death row ==
On June 18, 1993, the director of the BOP designated USP Terre Haute as the site where executions under federal death sentences would be carried out. The BOP itself established Terre Haute as a death row facility on July 19 of that year, including the establishment of the "Special Confinement Unit", the federal death row for men. The Bureau of Prisons modified USP Terre Haute in 1995 and 1996 so it could house death row functions. On July 13, 1999, the Special Confinement Unit at USP Terre Haute opened, and the BOP transferred male federal death row inmates from other federal prisons and from state prisons to USP Terre Haute.

Since 1963, sixteen people have been executed by the United States federal government. All sixteen were executed at USP Terre Haute. Timothy McVeigh, who was convicted for his responsibility for the Oklahoma City bombing, was the first prisoner executed by the U.S. federal government since the national moratorium on the death penalty was lifted in 1976 and the U.S. federal death penalty was reinstated in November 1988. Legal means of execution, as authorised by the United States Department of Justice in a 2026 memorandum, include lethal injection, nitrogen hypoxia, electric chair, or firing squad.

As of December 2025, three men are on federal death row. Two of them are housed at USP Terre Haute. As of 2024, due to security concerns, death row inmate Dzhokhar Tsarnaev is held at the United States Penitentiary Florence Administrative Maximum Facility (ADX Florence) near Florence, Colorado. The federal government chose Terre Haute as the location of the men's death row due to its central location within the United States.

== See also ==
- List of U.S. federal prisons
- Federal Bureau of Prisons
- Incarceration in the United States
- Capital punishment by the United States federal government
- List of people executed by the United States federal government
