= Continuing Criminal Enterprise Statute =

American federal law

The Continuing Criminal Enterprise Statute (commonly referred to as CCE Statute or Kingpin Statute) is a United States federal law that targets large-scale drug traffickers who are responsible for long-term and elaborate drug conspiracies. Unlike the RICO Act, which covers a wide range of organized crime enterprises, the CCE statute covers only major narcotics organizations. CCE is codified as Chapter 13 of Title 21 of the United States Code, 21 U.S.C. § 848. The statute makes it a federal crime to commit or conspire to commit a continuing series of felony violations of the Comprehensive Drug Abuse Prevention and Control Act of 1970 when such acts are taken in concert with five or more other persons. For conviction under the statute, the offender must have been an organizer, manager, or supervisor of the continuing operation and have obtained substantial income or resources from the drug violations.

The sentence for a first CCE conviction is a mandatory minimum of twenty years imprisonment (with a maximum of life imprisonment), a fine of not more than $2 million, and the forfeiture of profits and any interest in the enterprise. Under the so-called "super kingpin" provision added as subsection (b) to the CCE statute in 1984, a person convicted of being a "principal" administrator, organizer, or leader of a criminal enterprise that either involves a large amount of narcotics (at least 300 times the quantity that would trigger a five-year mandatory-minimum sentence for possession) or generates a large amount of money (at least $10 million in gross receipts during a single year) must serve a mandatory life sentence. Anyone engaging in a continuing criminal enterprise who intentionally kills a person or causes an intentional killing may be sentenced to death. Probation, parole, and suspension of the sentence are prohibited.

== Famous cases ==
=== Johnny Eng ===
As the Triad dragon head of the Manhattan-based Flying Dragons street gang, in the late 1980s Johnny Eng imported hundreds of kilograms of ultra high purity heroin from the Far East for distribution throughout New York City. Eng enjoyed a millionaire lifestyle with mansions and luxury apartments all over the world, and used Hong Kong-based shell companies to launder his profits from drug trafficking. In 1988, several of his co-conspirators turn state's evidence after the United States Customs Service intercepted packages of heroin being mailed to the New York area from British Hong Kong. Eng was eventually sentenced in 1993 to 24 years in prison & a US$3.5 million fine after being convicted of 14 charges related to the Continuing Criminal Enterprise Statute and drug trafficking.

=== Newtowne Gang ===
In 1992, several members of a drug trafficking syndicate, known as the Newtowne Gang, committed a series of multiple murders in Richmond, Virginia in furtherance of the syndicate's growing influence in the area. A total of 11 people, including members of the gang's rival syndicates, were killed.

The gang's key members – Corey Johnson, Richard Tipton and James H. Roane Jr. – were arrested and charged under the federal drug laws for committing murders in furtherance of a continuing criminal enterprise, an offence that carried the death penalty. Several other members implicated in the murders were also charged.

In the end, Johnson was sentenced to death and executed by lethal injection on January 14, 2021, for seven counts of murder. Roane and Tipton were also condemned to federal death row but subsequently had their death sentences commuted to life without parole by then President Joe Biden on December 23, 2024. Several others were also given varying custodial sentences for their differing roles in the slayings.

=== Black Mafia Family ===
The Black Mafia Family was a major cocaine distribution organization led by brothers Demetrius "Big Meech" Flenory and Terry "Southwest T" Flenory. Originally from the streets of Southwest Detroit, the brothers started selling $50 bags of crack in high school and by the early 1990s were distributing thousands of kilograms of cocaine in over 21 states.

=== Rayful Edmond III ===
Rayful Edmond was convicted of distributing thousands of kilograms of cocaine in the Washington, D.C. area. His trial featured the first-ever anonymous jury in the District's history. Furthermore, jurors were kept behind bulletproof glass in the courtroom and the defendant, Edmond, was housed at the U.S. Marine Base at Quantico and flown in daily on military transport.

=== Larry Hoover ===
Larry Hoover was the founder of the Gangster Disciples street gang and was alleged to be its leader despite being in prison since 1973. On August 31, 1995, Hoover was arrested by federal agents at the Vienna Correctional Center and moved to MCC Chicago, being charged with Continuing Criminal Enterprise and a host of other charges related to gang activity. He is currently serving a life sentence at the super-maximum security facility in ADX Florence in Florence, Colorado.

=== Tijuana Cartel ===
Several leaders of the Tijuana Cartel all would eventually have CCE charges brought against them for cocaine, heroin, methamphetamine, and marijuana trafficking offenses; as well as numerous murders. All brothers involved in the cartel are now either dead or in prison.

=== Augusto Falcon and Salvador Magluta ===
Salvador "Sal" Magluta and Augusto "Willy" Falcon operated one of the most significant cocaine trafficking organizations in South Florida history. They were indicted by a federal grand jury in April 1991 for a plethora of drug trafficking crimes, including operating a continuing criminal enterprise. They were accused of importing and distributing over 75 tons of cocaine, or over 68,181 kilograms (150,000 lbs). Both Magluta and Falcon were found not guilty after a lengthy trial before Judge Federico Moreno. Magluta was represented by Roy Black, Martin Wienberg, and Richard Martinez and Falcon was represented by Albert Krieger, Susan Van Dusen, and D. Robert "Bobby" Wells. Following the trial, the United States Attorney's Office directed an investigation into Magluta and Falcon's finances that ultimately revealed that members of their jury - including the jury foreman - had been bribed. Magluta, Falcon, several of the jurors, their associates and even some of their lawyers were ultimately charged with various criminal offenses arising from the conduct. Magluta was eventually sentenced to 205 years in federal prison, while Falcon received only 20 years after striking a plea deal with the government. Magluta was initially transferred to the Supermax federal prison facility in Florence, Colorado. In 2010, after Magluta's attorney, Paul Petruzzi, sued the Federal Government, Magluta was transferred out of ADX Florence. Federal agents involved in the case say there are few drug traffickers in history more successful or well-known than Magluta and Falcon. Magluta is currently seeking a new trial based on over 40 legal violations. He is presently represented by Paul Petruzzi and Richard Klugh.

=== Felix Mitchell ===
Felix "The Cat" Mitchell was a well-known heroin kingpin and leader of the "69 Mob" in Oakland, CA. At its height, his empire covered all of California and extended into the Midwest. His organization brought in an estimated $400,000 in monthly business. In 1985 Felix was convicted of running a continuing criminal enterprise and sentenced to life in prison in USP Leavenworth, one of the most violent facilities in the country. Less than a year into his sentence, on August 21, 1986, Felix was stabbed to death in his cell, just days before his 32nd birthday. His funeral was a major spectacle in Oakland. Over 10 Rolls-Royce limousines trailed the horse-drawn carriage that carried his body. Many celebrities and over 1,000 people attended the elaborate funeral, which received international media coverage.

=== Ross William Ulbricht ===
Ross William Ulbricht was indicted under the Continuing Criminal Enterprise statute, along with other offenses, for running the Silk Road online marketplace. On February 4, 2015, he was found guilty on all counts. On May 29, 2015, Ulbricht was sentenced to two life sentences plus 40 years without the possibility of parole. On January 21, 2025, Ulbricht was pardoned by President Donald Trump.

=== Joaquin Guzman ===
Joaquin "El Chapo" Guzman was the leader of the Sinaloa Cartel, a drug cartel known for shipping cocaine, methamphetamines, marijuana, and heroin throughout the US. He was charged with 27 separate violations and the jury decided that he was guilty of 25. Guzmán was imprisoned at ADX Florence, a supermax prison in Colorado, after he was sentenced on July 17, 2019.

=== Aaron Shamo ===
Aaron Shamo was a former Eagle Scout who became a dark web drug kingpin based in Utah. His multi-million dollar drug trafficking ring distributed over half a million counterfeit pills around the country and was responsible for multiple overdose deaths. In August 2019, Shamo was convicted of running a continuing criminal enterprise and received a life sentence in October 2020. Shamo was the only one convicted under this statute, as his co-conspirators got various other convictions and sentences of up to 10 years in prison. On February 2nd, 2022, American Greed released an episode titled "The Kingpin Next Door" which covers the story.

=== Rui-Siang Lin ===
On May 20, 2024, a 23-year-old was arrested and indicted under the Continuing Criminal Enterprise Statute "Kingpin" provision for running the online dark market drug marketplace Incognito Market, along with charges of narcotics conspiracy, money laundering, and conspiracy to sell misbranded medication. On December 16, 2024, Lin reached a plea deal with prosecutors, pleading guilty to narcotics conspiracy, money laundering, and conspiracy to sell misbranded medication in exchange for the dismissal of the Continuing a Criminal Enterprise charge. Lin, facing 35 years to life in prison, was sentenced to 30 years on February 3, 2026.

== See also ==
- RICO Act
- United States Patriot Act
