= Jon Jay =

American baseball player (born 1985)

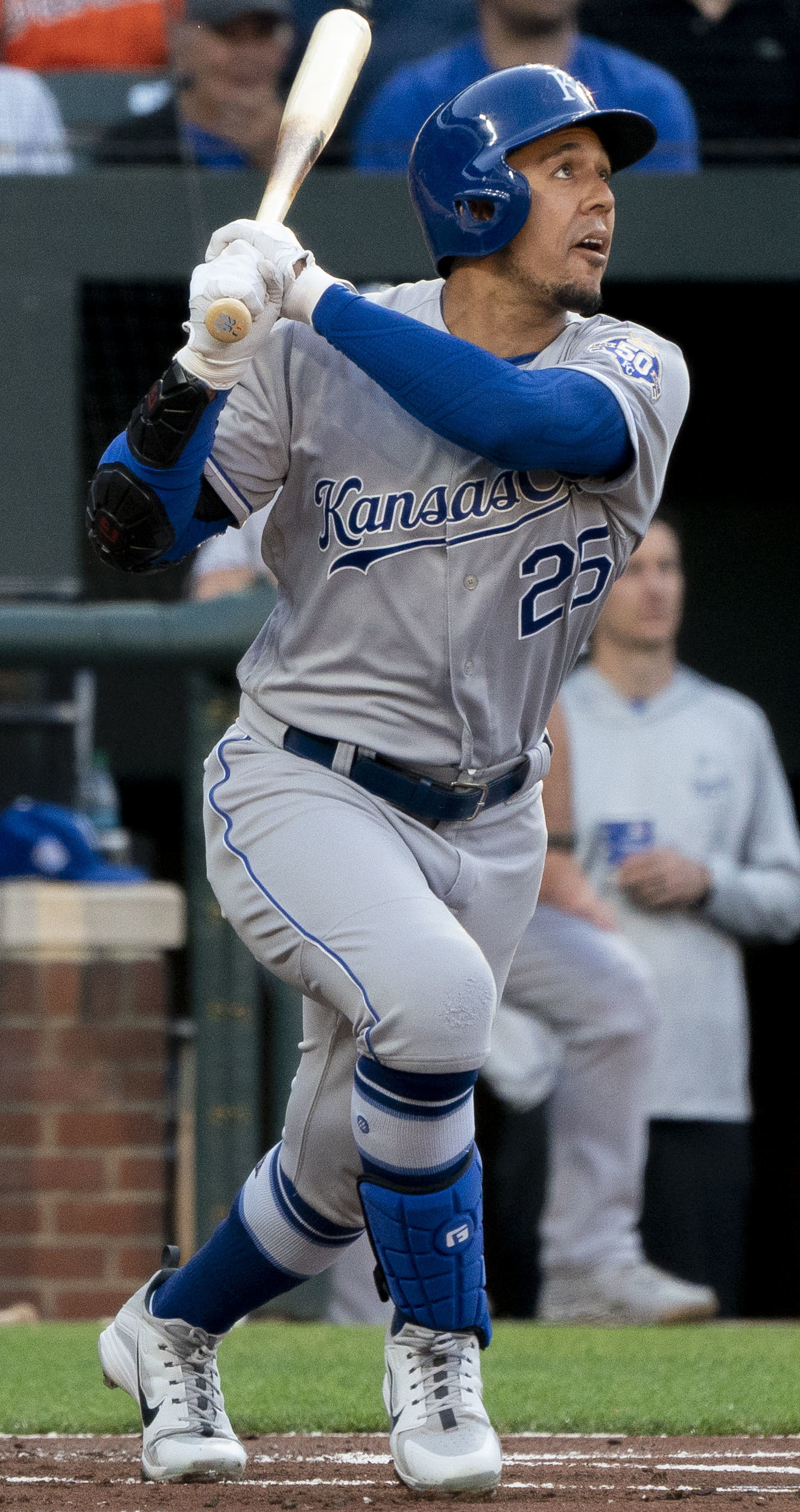
- Jay with the Kansas City Royals in 2018

St. Louis Cardinals – No. 19
- Outfielder / Coach
- Born: March 15, 1985 (age 41); Miami, Florida, U.S.
- Batted: Left Threw: Left

MLB debut
- April 26, 2010, for the St. Louis Cardinals

Last MLB appearance
- May 12, 2021, for the Los Angeles Angels

MLB statistics
- Batting average: .283
- Home runs: 37
- Runs batted in: 341
- Stats at Baseball Reference

Teams
- As player: St. Louis Cardinals (2010–2015); San Diego Padres (2016); Chicago Cubs (2017); Kansas City Royals (2018); Arizona Diamondbacks (2018); Chicago White Sox (2019); Arizona Diamondbacks (2020); Los Angeles Angels (2021); As coach: Miami Marlins (2023–2024); St. Louis Cardinals (2025–present)

Career highlights and awards
- World Series champion (2011)

Jonathan Henry Jay (born March 15, 1985) is an American professional baseball coach and former outfielder who is the outfield, base running, and quality control coach for the St. Louis Cardinals of Major League Baseball (MLB). He played 12 seasons in MLB for the Cardinals, San Diego Padres, Chicago Cubs, Kansas City Royals, Arizona Diamondbacks, Chicago White Sox, and Los Angeles Angels.

A product of the University of Miami, Jay played college baseball for the Miami Hurricanes. He was the Cardinals’ second (of three) second-round selection(s) (74th overall), in the 2006 MLB draft. Through the end of the 2020 season, Jon Jay has the fourth highest modern-day career fielding percentage for a center fielder at .996, behind only Darin Erstad, Myles Straw, and Shane Victorino.

Jay made his big league debut for the Cardinals in 2010, after batting .301, with 4 home runs (HR), a .780 on-base plus slugging percentage (OPS), and 2 stolen bases (SB), in 105 major league games. The starting center fielder for four consecutive National League Championship Series (NLCS)-qualifying clubs as a Cardinal (2011−14), he was a World Series champion in 2011, as the Cardinals defeated the Texas Rangers. Between 2011 and 2013, Jay established an errorless record streak for National League (NL) center fielders at 245 games. In 2012, he finished tenth in the NL in both batting average and on-base percentage (OBP).

After wrist injuries limited Jay's effectiveness in 2015, he was traded to the Padres. He signed a one-year US$4M contract to play the 2019 season with the Chicago White Sox.

== Early life ==
Jay was born in Miami, Florida, and spent his youth there. His parents immigrated to the United States from Cuba—his mother from Matanzas and his father from Santiago in the 1960s. He is of distant Spanish descent. His father, Justo Jay, spent 19 years in prison for his role in the cocaine trafficking organization of Sal Magluta and Willy Falcon. Jay attended George Washington Carver Middle School and Christopher Columbus High School.

== College career ==
Showing exceptional baseball skill in high school, Jay played on the state championship-winning team during his senior year in 2003. He received a scholarship at the University of Miami and played for the Miami Hurricanes baseball team. During his three years at UM, Jay had a combined .387 batting average (BA), with 31 doubles (2B), four triples (3B), seven home runs (HR), and 108 runs batted in (RBI), in 120 games played (G). In 2005, he played collegiate summer baseball with the Brewster Whitecaps of the Cape Cod Baseball League. The Cardinals selected him in the second round (74th overall) of the 2006 MLB draft.

== Professional career ==
=== St. Louis Cardinals ===
After signing with St. Louis, Jay made his professional debut that year with the Swing of the Quad Cities and spent the whole season there, slashing .342/.416/.462, with three HR and 45 RBI in 60 games. In 2007, he played with the Palm Beach Cardinals, where he batted .286, with two homers and ten RBI in 32 games, and the Springfield Cardinals, where he posted a .235 average, two HR, and 11 RBI in 26 games. Jay began 2008 with Springfield, and after batting .306/.379/.457, with 11 HR, and 47 RBI, in 96 games, he was promoted to Memphis where he ended the season with a .345 batting average, one HR, and ten RBI, in 16 games. Jay spent 2009 with Memphis, where he compiled a .281 batting average, with ten HR, 54 RBI, and 20 stolen bases in 136 games. He began 2010 with Memphis.

Jay made his Major League debut on April 26, 2010 with the St. Louis Cardinals, after having begun his second consecutive season with the Memphis Redbirds. During his rookie season, he played in 105 games and made 323 plate appearances (PA), batting .300, with 19 doubles, and a .359 on-base percentage (OBP). In the outfield, Jay played all three positions. Stationed mainly in right field, he collected five assists.

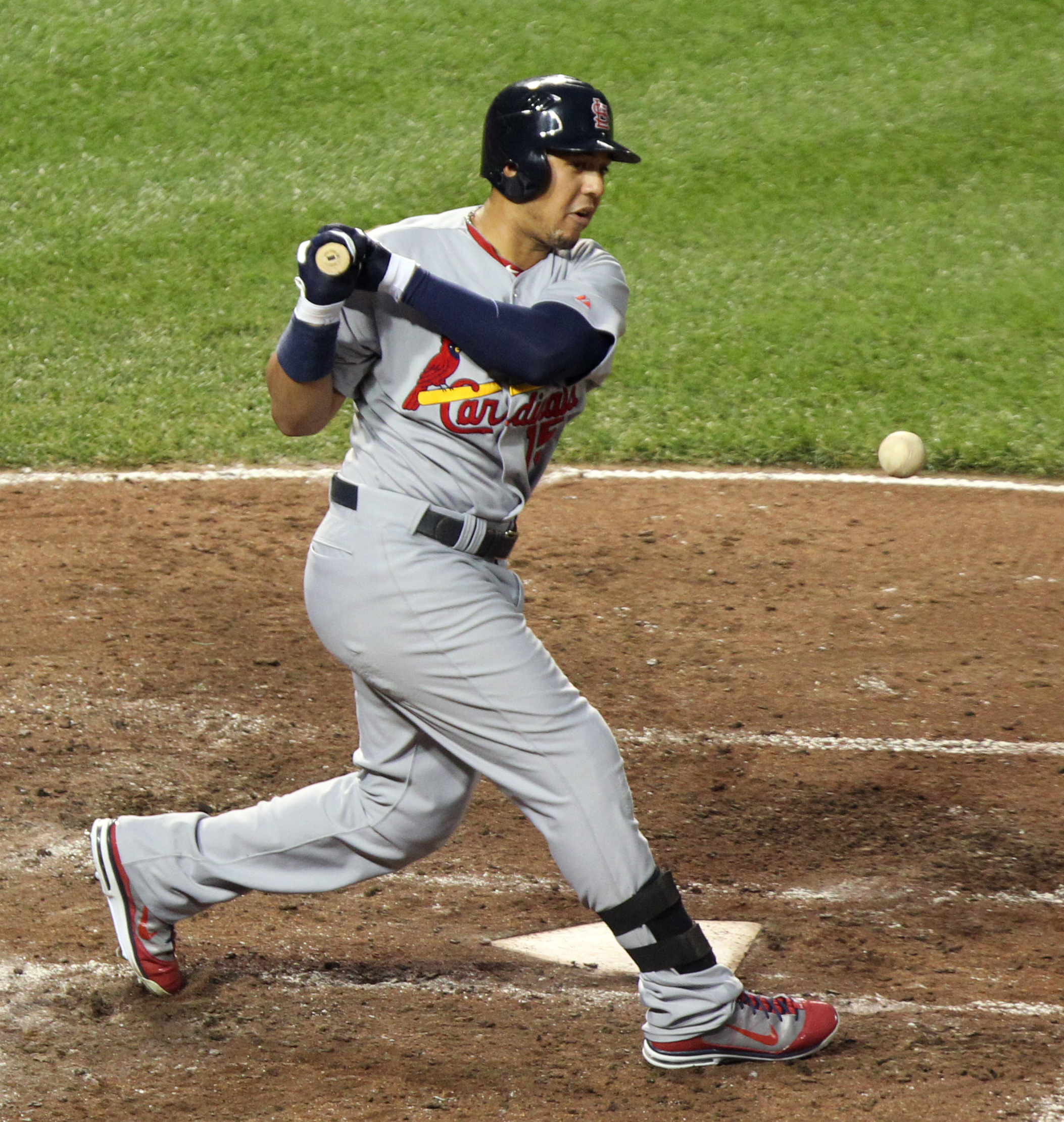
Jay with the St. Louis Cardinals, 2011

On July 27, 2011, the Cardinals traded starting center fielder Colby Rasmus to the Toronto Blue Jays, clearing the way for Jay to take over as the regular center fielder. That season, he led the team in games played (159) and batted .297 with a career-high 10 HR.

In Game 6 of the 2011 World Series, Jay had a key hit in the 10th inning and later scored the tying run on a line drive into centerfield by Lance Berkman.

On May 15, 2012, Jay was moved to the 15-day disabled list due to lingering shoulder soreness after running into the outfield wall the month before, but he returned shortly thereafter. For the year, he finished with career-bests in batting average (.305) and OBP (.373), both of which placed tenth in the National League (NL). His 19 stolen bases (SB) were another career best. He hit four HR and collected 40 RBI, 22 doubles, and scored 70 runs.

Between August 24, 2011, and July 30, 2013, Jay established a new NL all-time errorless streak record for center fielders at 245 games against the Pittsburgh Pirates. It is also the longest streak for all Cardinals outfielders. Curt Flood, a former Cardinal, owned the previous center field record of 226 games spanning from Sep 3, 1965 to Jun 2, 1967.

With increased playing time in 2013, Jay established career-highs in PA (628), doubles (27), runs (75), BB (52), and RBI (67). However, his batting average (.276) and SLG (.370) slumped to career lows. Jay was third among NL center fielders in games played (153), fourth in putouts (335), first in double plays (three), and second in fielding percentage (.997). Conversely, advanced defensive metrics showed he was ten runs below average for center fielders for defensive runs saved (DRS), ranking 32nd in MLB. From 2011 to 2013, Fangraphs rated his arm at 21st out of 21 centerfielders who played at least 2,000 innings. Runners advanced for extra bases on Jay in 60 percent of plays.

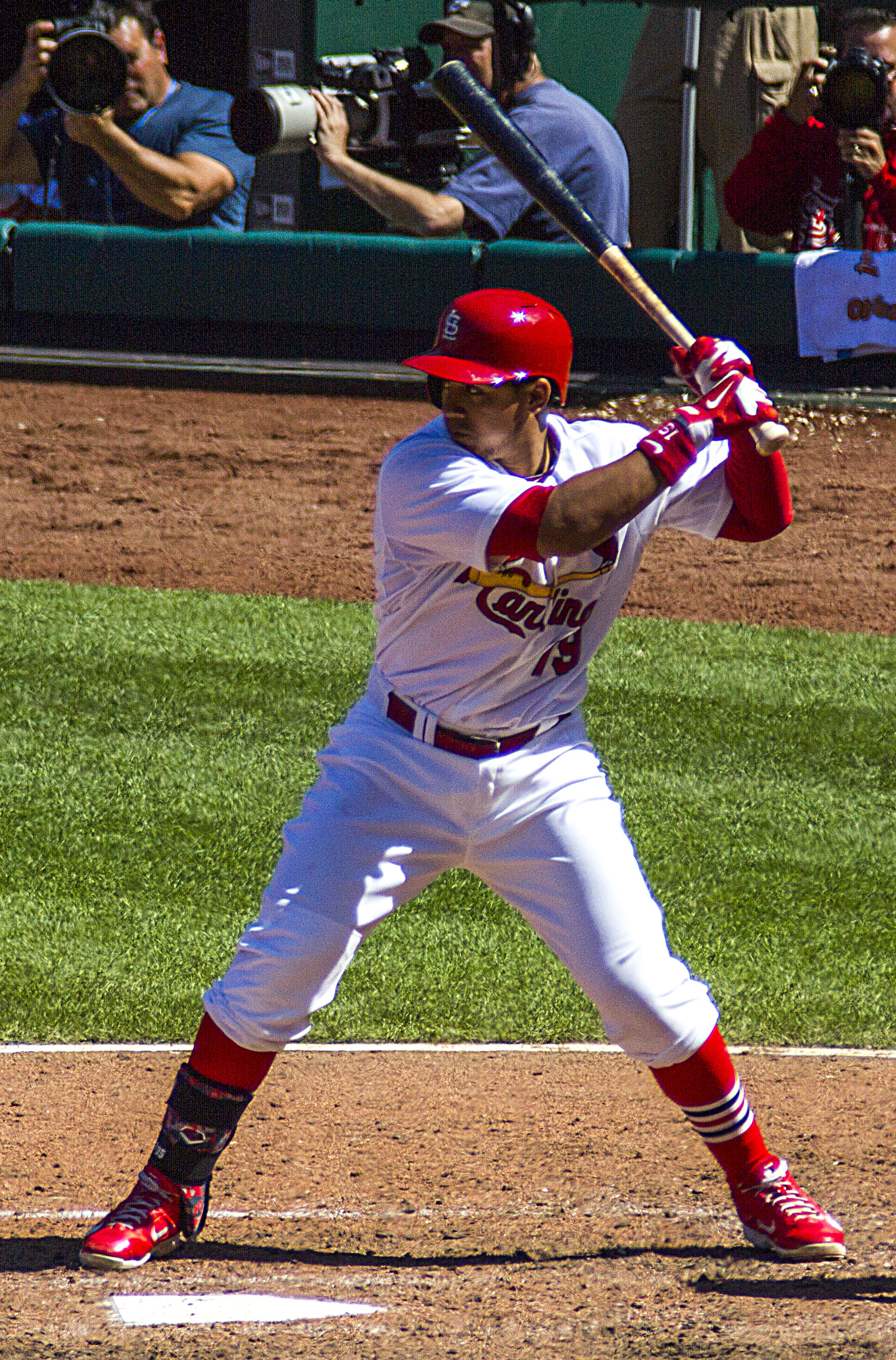
Jay with the St. Louis Cardinals, 2014

The Cardinals agreed with Jay on a one-year $3.25 million contract on January 17, 2014, to avoid arbitration. Through 2013, Jay had a career batting average of .300 with a .356 OBP and a .400 SLG.

After the Cardinals acquired outfielder Peter Bourjos in a trade with the Los Angeles Angels of Anaheim during the offseason of 2013, Jay's role on the club was expected to be reduced during 2014. Bourjos's impressive defensive ability was one of the main reasons for the trade, as Jay's 2013 defensive campaign was probably the worst of his career. But after a poor offensive April for Bourjos, Jay's playing time started to increase throughout the season, as Bourjos found himself on the bench more and more. By the end of the season, Jay finished batting .303, with three home runs while driving in 46 runs. Although appearing in only 17 fewer games in 2014 than in 2013, Jay had 135 fewer at-bats, and could not contend for the batting title, where at one point in September he was batting well over .320, which was higher than the final .319 batting average of Justin Morneau, who won the batting title. He led the major leagues in hit by pitch, with 20. During the postseason, where Jay had historically struggled throughout his career, he batted .478, going 14-29 throughout the NLDS and NLCS.

In the off-season preceding the 2015 season, Jay had surgery on the left wrist, which did not heal completely. He struggled through other injuries on the same wrist, such as a bone bruise and tendinitis, hampering his ability to hit effectively. Jay missed a number of games in the month of May, and another 57 from July 1 to September 4.

=== San Diego Padres ===
On December 8, 2015, Jay was traded to the San Diego Padres in exchange for Jedd Gyorko. After a productive first couple of months of the season for the Padres, Jay suffered a broken forearm on June 19 and was placed on the DL on June 28. He was reactivated on September 6 and finished the season with a .291 batting average in 90 games played.

=== Chicago Cubs ===
Jay hit .287 in seven seasons with the Cardinals and Padres. As a free agent, Jay signed a one-year, $8 million contract with the Chicago Cubs on November 29, 2016. On July 6, 2017, Jay pitched a scoreless 9th inning in an 11–2 defeat by the Milwaukee Brewers. Jay had a batting average of .296 in 379 at-bats for the Cubs in 2017.

=== Kansas City Royals ===
On March 6, 2018, Jay signed a one-year, $3 million, contract with the Kansas City Royals.

=== Arizona Diamondbacks ===
On June 6, 2018, the Royals traded Jay to the Arizona Diamondbacks in exchange for Elvis Luciano and Gabe Speier. For the season, he had the lowest fly ball percentage of all major league hitters (16.5%).

=== Chicago White Sox ===
Jay signed a one-year contract with the Chicago White Sox on January 10, 2019. He began the season on the 60-day disabled list and was activated on June 24, 2019. He underwent hip surgery on August 30, ending his season after playing only 47 games. He had the slowest sprint speed of all major league right fielders, at 24.8 feet/second.

=== Arizona Diamondbacks (second stint) ===
On February 3, 2020, Jay signed a minor league deal with the Arizona Diamondbacks. Jay had his contract selected to the 40-man roster on July 18, 2020. In 2020, Jay slashed .160/.211/.240 with 1 home run and 4 RBI in 18 games.

=== Los Angeles Angels ===
On February 11, 2021, Jay signed a minor league deal with the Los Angeles Angels that included an invitation to Spring Training. On March 26, 2021, Jay was released by the Angels. On March 27, Jay re-signed with the Angels on a new minor league contract. On April 13, 2021, Jay was selected to the active roster. He was designated for assignment by the Angels on April 16 after going 1-for-8 with a single and two strikeouts in eight at-bats. He was outrighted to the alternate training site on April 23. On May 6, Jay was re-selected to the active roster. On May 14, Jay was again designated for assignment. On May 17, he was outrighted to Triple-A.

In late May 2021, Jay was named to the roster of the United States national baseball team for the Americas Qualifying Event. Jay hit .362/.384/.464 with 1 home run and 5 RBI in 18 games with Salt Lake before he was released on July 13.

On April 27, 2022, Jay announced his retirement from baseball.

== Coaching career ==
On November 10, 2022, the Miami Marlins hired Jay as their first base coach for the 2023 season. The move reunited him with newly appointed manager Skip Schumaker, his former teammate. On October 2, 2024, Jay was fired alongside the entirety of the Marlins coaching staff.

On October 21, 2024, it was announced that the St. Louis Cardinals would be adding Jay to their coaching staff for the 2025 season as an assistant coach. His title was changed to outfield, base running, and quality control coach for the 2026 season.

== Personal life ==
At various times, he has been nicknamed "The Federalist", "The Founding Father", and "The Chief Justice" in honor of the U.S. Founding Father John Jay and his contributions to The Federalist Papers. Shortly into the 2016 season, NBC 7 San Diego lead sports reporter Derek Togerson popularized "The Federalist", which quickly became popular with Padres fans. Razzball.com originally started calling him The Federalist back in 2011. Jay choose "305-J" as his nickname for the Players Weekend during the 2017 season with the Cubs.

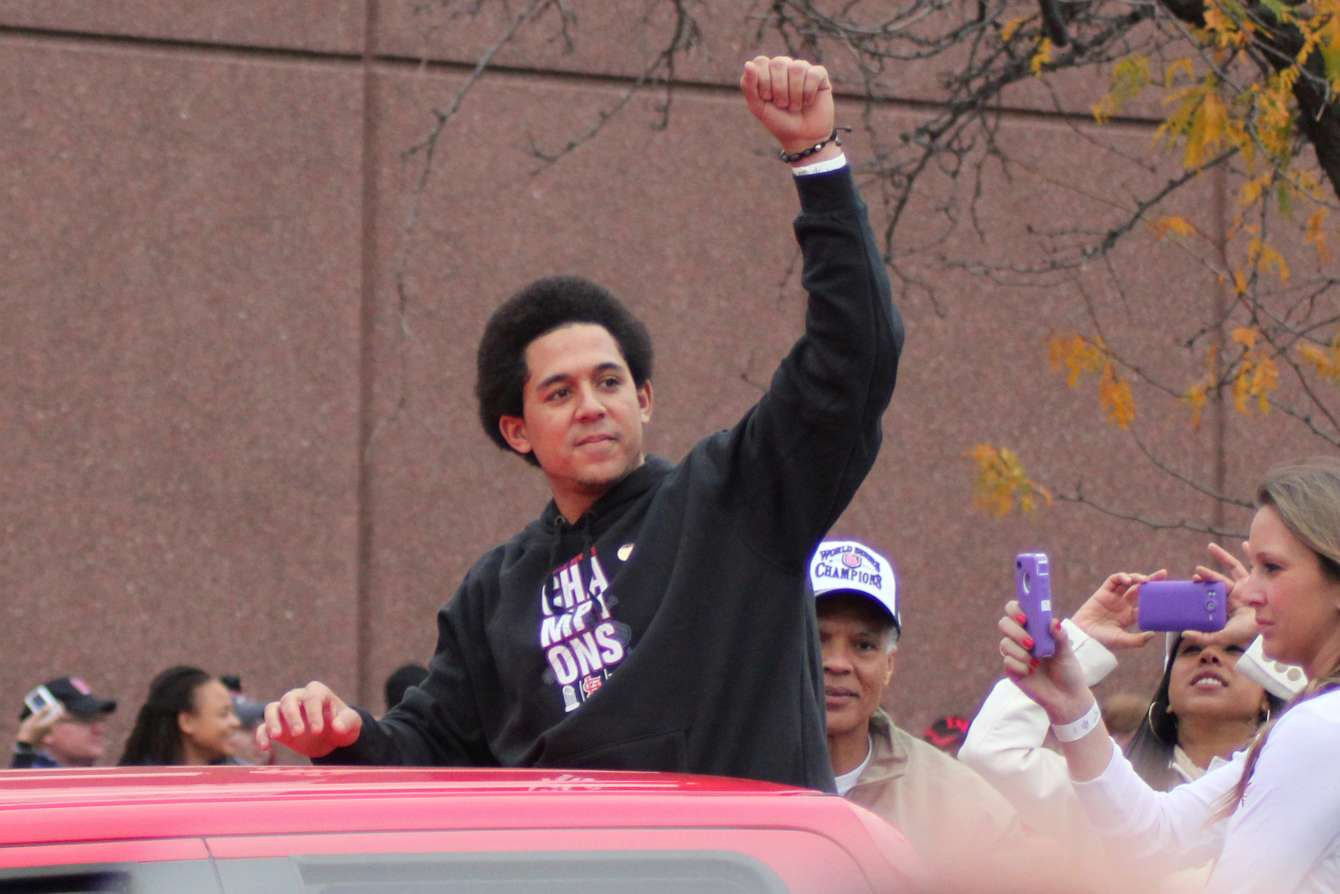
Jay during the 2011 World Series parade

On January 28, 2011, Jay hosted a charity bowling event at Lucky Strikes Lanes in Miami Beach, Florida. Called Jon Jay's Celebrity Bowling Challenge, an estimated $25,000 were accumulated throughout the almost four-hour event and went to Chapman Partnership, involved in homeless centers throughout the Miami-area. Jon and his family had been involved in charities just like Chapman Partnership throughout his childhood. Among the twenty Major League Baseball attendees were Yonder Alonso, J. P. Arencibia, Gio González, Drew Storen, Chris Marrero, Tyler Greene, Allen Craig, Lance Lynn, John Mayberry, Gaby Sánchez, Manny Machado, and Mike Lowell. Chris Bosh was also present.

Jay married Nikki Stecich in November 2013 and they had twin girls on December 1, 2016. They reside in St. Louis.

In May 2014, Jay hosted another bowling event, this time with Allen Craig. They named it the Jay-Craig Celebrity Bowl and held it at the Flamingo Bowl in downtown St. Louis. The proceeds benefited Great Circle, a nonprofit organization that provides behavioral health services autism, educational challenges, emotional health, in-home crisis intervention, foster care and adoption, adventure therapy and psychological trauma recovery.

In December 2015, Jay accompanied joined former Cardinals player and manager Joe Torre and then-Cardinals catcher Brayan Peña on an expedition to Cuba. It was MLB's first visit there since 1999, and one anticipated as an important step to help normalize relations with the United States that had begun to ease earlier in the year.
