= Corey Johnson (murderer) =

American convicted serial killer and drug trafficker

- Johnson in federal custody in 1992
- Born: November 5, 1968; New York City, U.S.
- Died: January 14, 2021 (aged 52); USP Terre Haute, Indiana, U.S.
- Status: Executed by lethal injection
- Convictions: Murder in furtherance of a continuing criminal enterprise (7 counts); Murder in aid of racketeering (7 counts); Crimes of violence in aid of racketeering (4 counts); Use of a firearm during a crime of violence (7 counts); Possession cocaine base with intent to distribute (2 counts); Conspiracy to possess cocaine base with the intent to distribute
- Penalty: Death (February 16, 1993)
- Accomplices: Vernon Lance Thomas; Richard Tipton; James H. Roane Jr.

Details
- Victims: 7
- Date: January–February 1992
- Location: Richmond, Virginia
- Imprisoned at: United States Penitentiary, Terre Haute

Corey Johnson (Note: Other sources spelt his name as "Cory Johnson".) (November 5, 1968 – January 14, 2021) was an American convicted serial killer and co-founder of a Virginia drug trafficking gang who murdered seven people in 1992, with the purpose of increasing the gang's drug trade monopoly in Richmond, Virginia. Johnson and two members of his gang were found guilty under a federal law that targets large-scale drug traffickers, and Johnson was sentenced to death for each of the seven counts of murder he was tried for.

Johnson remained on death row for 28 years before he was put to death by lethal injection on January 14, 2021, as the second-last person on federal death row to be executed before the 2021 moratorium on federal death sentences. The other members of Johnson's gang were also found guilty and received varying prison sentences, including the death penalty (later commuted to life), life without the possibility of parole, and shorter sentences for those who were not involved in the murders.

== Personal life ==
Born on November 5, 1968, Corey Johnson, who originated from New York City, came from a dysfunctional family background and had a broken childhood overall, based on the case of his defense lawyers.

Johnson was reportedly abused by his mother and her boyfriends since he was young, and his mother was a drug addict who neglected him and eventually abandoned him at age 13. Johnson spent the remainder of his teenage years in various residential and institutional facilities before he reached the maximum age under the foster care system and was left to fend for himself. Johnson did not excel academically in school, as he could only read and write at an elementary school level, and he was assessed with a low IQ of 77.

In 1989, Johnson, who turned to a life of crime, co-founded a gang, dubbed the "Newtowne Gang", which dabbled in cocaine trafficking in Richmond, Virginia.

== 1992 Virginia murders ==
Between January 1992 and February 1992, in a period of 45 days, a total of ten murders (some sources claimed there were 11 murders) were committed by several members of the Newtowne Gang, and Johnson was responsible for seven to eight out of these killings, either by himself or with the involvement of his fellow gang members. All these homicides were committed in Richmond, Virginia.

=== Johnson's victims ===
On January 14, 1992, Johnson shot and killed a rival drug dealer named Peyton Johnson in a tavern. Johnson was together with two gang members, James H. Roane Jr. and an unnamed third person. Fifteen days later, on January 29, 1992, Johnson and two of his accomplices – Vernon Lance Thomas and Roane – shot and killed Louis Johnson, the bodyguard of a rival drug trafficker, in an alley.

Three days later, on February 1, 1992, Johnson, Thomas, and Roane shot and killed a man named Torrick Brown, who was previously at loggerheads with Roane, and the trio even attacked and critically injured Torrick's half-sister, Martha McCoy. Later on that same day, Johnson alone would commit a triple murder. He entered the home of Bobby Long, who failed to repay him for a drug supply, and Johnson murdered him. At Long's house, Johnson also murdered two more people – Long's sister Dorothy Armstrong and their male acquaintance Anthony Carter. Carter and Armstrong were both reportedly not involved in the drug ring despite Long's involvement.

On February 19, 1992, 18 days after murdering Brown, Long, Armstrong, and Carter, Johnson suspected that a man named Linwood Chiles was secretly cooperating with the police. Two sisters Priscilla and Gwen Greene, as well as Chiles and another man, Curtis Thorne, were arranged to meet with Johnson and his associate Richard Tipton on that day itself, and during the encounter, Johnson brandished his gun and shot the four of them. The sisters were critically injured in the same incident but survived, while both Thorne and Chiles died from the shooting.

=== Other victims ===
Although Johnson was not involved, the remaining confirmed victims of the 1992 crime spree were killed by Johnson's three accomplices - James H. Roane Jr., Richard Tipton, and Vernon Lance Thomas.

On January 4, 1992, Douglas Talley, an associate suspected of mishandling a drug transaction, was taken to the south side of Richmond and killed by both Tipton and Roane, suffering 84 stab wounds to his head, neck, and upper body.

On January 13, 1992, Douglas Moody, a suspected rival drug pusher, was shot by Tipton but he managed to flee despite his wounds. Roane, who was together with Tipton at that time, caught up with Moody, and stabbed him 18 times, which resulted in Moody's death.

== Trial and sentencing ==
The trio – Corey Johnson, Richard Tipton and James H. Roane Jr. – were arrested and later tried for the 11 murders at the U.S. District Court for the Eastern District of Virginia. Johnson faced seven counts of murder (but he was not charged for killing Brown), while Tipton and Roane each faced eight and four counts respectively. All three of them were charged under a federal law that targeted large-scale drug traffickers, and the trio were accused of committing these murders in order to further the influence of their drug trafficking syndicate, and it warranted either a death sentence or life imprisonment without the possibility of parole. Johnson and his associates were among the first drug traffickers to be charged and dealt with under this particular law since its enactment in 1988. The first death sentence under this law was imposed in 1991, where a man was convicted of a drug-related slaying in Alabama. The convict, David Ronald Chandler, eventually had his death sentence commuted to life without parole by then President Bill Clinton in 2001.

On the 17th day of the trial on February 3, 1993, the 12-member jury returned with their verdict, and in the case of Johnson, they found him guilty of all seven counts of murder as originally charged, while Tipton was convicted of six murders but acquitted of two, and Roane was convicted of three killings but acquitted of the fourth and final charge of murder. Roane's convictions were for the murders of Moody, Peyton Johnson and Louis Johnson while Tipton's convictions were for the murders of Talley, Armstrong, Carter, Long, Thorne and Chiles. The trio were also convicted of lesser charges; Johnson was convicted of another 20 criminal charges pertaining to his involvement in the drug trafficking syndicate.

On February 16, 1993, after some deliberations from the jury during the sentencing stage, 24-year-old Johnson was handed a total of seven death sentences for each of the seven murders he personally committed, while for the remaining two co-accused, 26-year-old Roane was sentenced to death for one murder but received two life terms for the other two murders; while 22-year-old Tipton was given three life sentences and three death sentences. The district judge James Spencer officially passed the sentence on the trio on June 1, 1993, with pursuant to the jury's verdict.

In separate trials, the fourth gang member Sandra Reaves was convicted of being part of the conspiracy to perpetuate cocaine trafficking, and sentenced to 16 years in prison.

Vernon Lance Thomas, the fifth gang member, was tried for 15 counts, including four murders. Although he initially faced a death sentence, the prosecution later had it taken off the table after considering the evidence of Thomas's intellectual disability. Thomas was found guilty and sentenced to life in prison without parole. He is currently imprisoned at United States Penitentiary, Hazelton in West Virginia.

The sixth and seventh gang members, Jerry R. Gaiters and Sterling Hardy, pleaded guilty to various charges and turned state witnesses against Johnson, Tipton, and Roane. The government described Hardy as the least culpable member of the gang. Hardy neither dealt drugs himself nor was directly involved in any of the murders. However, he was present when one murder was committed and drove the car and stayed outside at another murder. Hardy received a 35-year sentence, which was reduced to three years as a result of his extensive cooperation with the government. Gaiters was sentenced to 12 years in prison. In his case, federal officials said Gaiters had sold drugs and accompanied Roane and Tipton to a triple murder, including that of his cousin. However, Richmond Sheriff C.T. Woody said Gaiters "was the key to actually getting the investigation started."

While out on supervised release, Hardy was charged with assault and petty larceny over domestic dispute with his former fiancée, whom he struck and stole her purse from. Hardy was sentenced to 5 years and three months in prison for violating the terms of his supervision. He was released from prison on October 20, 1999. Gaiters was released from prison on October 20, 2004.

Between 1996 and 2004, the appeals of the trio were dismissed by the higher courts. The trio were reportedly the longest-serving prisoners on federal death row as of June 2001.

== Death row and final appeal ==
Before July 2019, the last execution by the US federal government was conducted in 2003, when a former soldier was executed for a rape-murder case. Afterwards, there was a moratorium on all the remaining death sentences on the federal level. Johnson, who had exhausted all his avenues of appeal by May 2006, was originally slated to be executed together with Roane and Tipton in May 2006, but due to a court injunction, their respective executions were postponed, therefore extending the moratorium on federal executions. That same injunction was later vacated in September 2020. Eventually, a 17-year long moratorium on executions by the federal government ended with the execution of white supremacist Daniel Lewis Lee on July 16, 2020.

Four months after the resumption of federal executions, it was announced in November 2020 that five people would be executed by lethal injection from December 2020 to January 2021 . Corey Johnson, who was held on death row at the federal prison in Terre Haute, Indiana, was confirmed to be the fourth of these individuals slated for execution during this period, with his execution date set on January 14, 2021. His two co-defendants, Roane and Tipton, were not included among the other four individuals – Brandon Bernard, Alfred Bourgeois, Lisa Montgomery, and Dustin Higgs – listed for execution. Prior to the announcement of Johnson's death warrant, eight prisoners, all of whom were convicted of murder, were put to death since July 2020 by the US federal government. The huge spree of federal executions during the lame-duck period of Trump was known to be "unprecedented" and attracted widespread criticism from opponents of the death penalty.

As a final bid to escape the death penalty, Johnson's counsel filed a clemency petition with hopes of commuting his death sentence to life imprisonment, but the plea was denied. In late December 2020, less than a month before their execution dates, both Johnson and Higgs were tested positive for COVID-19, an infectious respiratory coronavirus that caused a worldwide pandemic since the start of 2020. Given that there were increasing rates of COVID-19 infection among the federal death row population and staff members in charge of the executions, there were calls to halt the upcoming executions out of fear that the virus may continue to spread.

The pair's respective counsel lodged legal motions to delay the duo's executions due to their infection and concerns that the coronavirus may cause damage to the men's lungs, which may cause pain akin to torture during the injection process. Although a stay of execution was granted by Justice Tanya Chutkan of the US District Court in Washington, the stay order was overturned by the higher courts with a 2–1 majority decision, paving a way once again for the executions of both Johnson and Higgs to proceed.

== Execution ==
On January 14, 2021, shortly after the loss of his final appeal, 52-year-old Corey Johnson was put to death by lethal injection at the USP Terre Haute. After a single dose of pentobarbital was administered, Johnson, who declined to say any last words, was pronounced dead at 11:34 p.m. For his last meal, Johnson ordered a pizza, jelly-filled doughnuts, and a strawberry milkshake. However, he only received the pizza and strawberry milkshake but did not get the doughnuts. Johnson's execution came nearly a day after the federal government executed Lisa Montgomery, who was the first woman to be executed by the federal government in 67 years.

In a written statement issued after his execution, Johnson expressed that he was deeply remorseful of his actions and wanted each of his victims, whom he addressed by their names, to be remembered, and he apologized to the families of the people he killed back in 1992. Johnson also briefly commented on his last meal in his last written statement, describing his pizza and strawberry shake as "wonderful" but lamented that he did not get the jelly-filled doughnuts he asked for, stating that this "should be fixed".

== Aftermath ==
Corey Johnson was the 12th and second-last prisoner to be executed since the resumption of federal executions in July 2020, and also the fourth out of five people to be executed during the presidential transition period of then US President Donald Trump. Two days after Johnson's death sentence was carried out, Dustin Higgs, who ordered the murders of three women in Maryland, was executed after losing his final plea for clemency. After the executions of both Johnson and Higgs, a moratorium was imposed on all remaining 40 or so death sentences on the federal level, with President Joe Biden promising to end the use of capital punishment by the federal US government upon assuming presidency during that same month.

=== Responses and posthumous controversy ===
Johnson's lawyers offered their condolences to their client, adding that he did not deserve to be executed since he was a changed man who never broke any prison rules and he had mental problems despite his heinous actions back in 1992, and how he did not let his mental problems hinder him from taking the GED. However, the prosecution and police officers involved in Johnson's case one way or the other stated that they found it fair that he should be executed, stating that he originally denied committing any of the murders at the time of his arrest and stated he was not as intellectually disabled as his counsel presented him to be, given that his killing spree was committed with merciless savagery on the purpose of helping his drug trafficking syndicate to gain monopoly in illegal drug trade.

There were controversies surrounding the federal death penalty, given the unusually high spate of executions occurring during the final months of Trump's presidency and some condemned the high rate of capital punishment in these cases. An autopsy report revealed that Johnson likely suffered from pulmonary edema, a painful condition akin to drowning. It was said that plenty of fluid rushed up his trachea that some leaked out of his mouth. In the aftermath of Johnson's execution, his low IQ became a point of discussion of whether he truly deserved to be executed given that the death penalty was prohibited in cases of intellectually disabled people. There were also calls for the review and abolition of federal capital punishment in light of the controversial points of Johnson's case and the 12 other cases of federal executions and the supposed flaws of the federal death penalty laws.

Three years after Johnson's execution, Reverend Bill Breeden, a religious minister and opponent of capital punishment, spoke about Johnson in an interview in early December 2024. Breeden told the USA Today that Johnson was known to be a "gentle giant" and he was remorseful for his actions, and he was no longer the same person who was sentenced to death back in 1993. Breeden also added that with his low intelligence, Johnson should have been excluded from the death penalty, and the trauma of witnessing Johnson's execution lingered on even after three years since it happened.

=== Fates of Johnson's accomplices (Roane and Tipton) ===
On December 23, 2024, nearly four years after Johnson's execution, outgoing President Joe Biden commuted the death sentences of 37 of the 40 federal death row inmates to life without parole. James H. Roane Jr. and Richard Tipton, Johnson's accomplices who were condemned to federal death row, were among the 37 prisoners to have their sentences commuted. As a result, Johnson became the only offender of the 1992 Virginia slayings to be executed by the federal government.

The commutation of Roane and Tipton's death sentences sparked outrage from the former investigators, jurors, and prosecutors who handled the Newtowne Gang case. Federal prosecutors Toby Vick and Buddy Parcell stated that Johnson and his gang were particularly violent offenders who deserved the death penalty for all the 11 murders they committed. Former Richmond Sheriff C. T. Woody stated that Roane and Tipton should have been executed as Johnson was. Charles V. Guthrie, a former juror in Johnson's trial, said the entire jury believed at the time that Johnson, Tipton, and Roane all deserved the death penalty due to the heinous nature of the trio's crimes.

== See also ==
- Capital punishment by the United States federal government
- List of people executed by the United States federal government
- List of people executed in the United States in 2021
- List of serial killers in the United States

Executions carried out by the United States federal government
Preceded by Lisa Montgomery January 13, 2021	Corey Johnson; January 14, 2021	Succeeded by Dustin Higgs January 16, 2021
Executions carried out in the United States
Preceded by Lisa Montgomery – Federal government January 13, 2021	Corey Johnson – Federal government January 14, 2021	Succeeded by Dustin Higgs – Federal government January 16, 2021
