= Snowden Hall (Laurel, Maryland) =

Historic mansion in Laurel, Maryland, U.S.

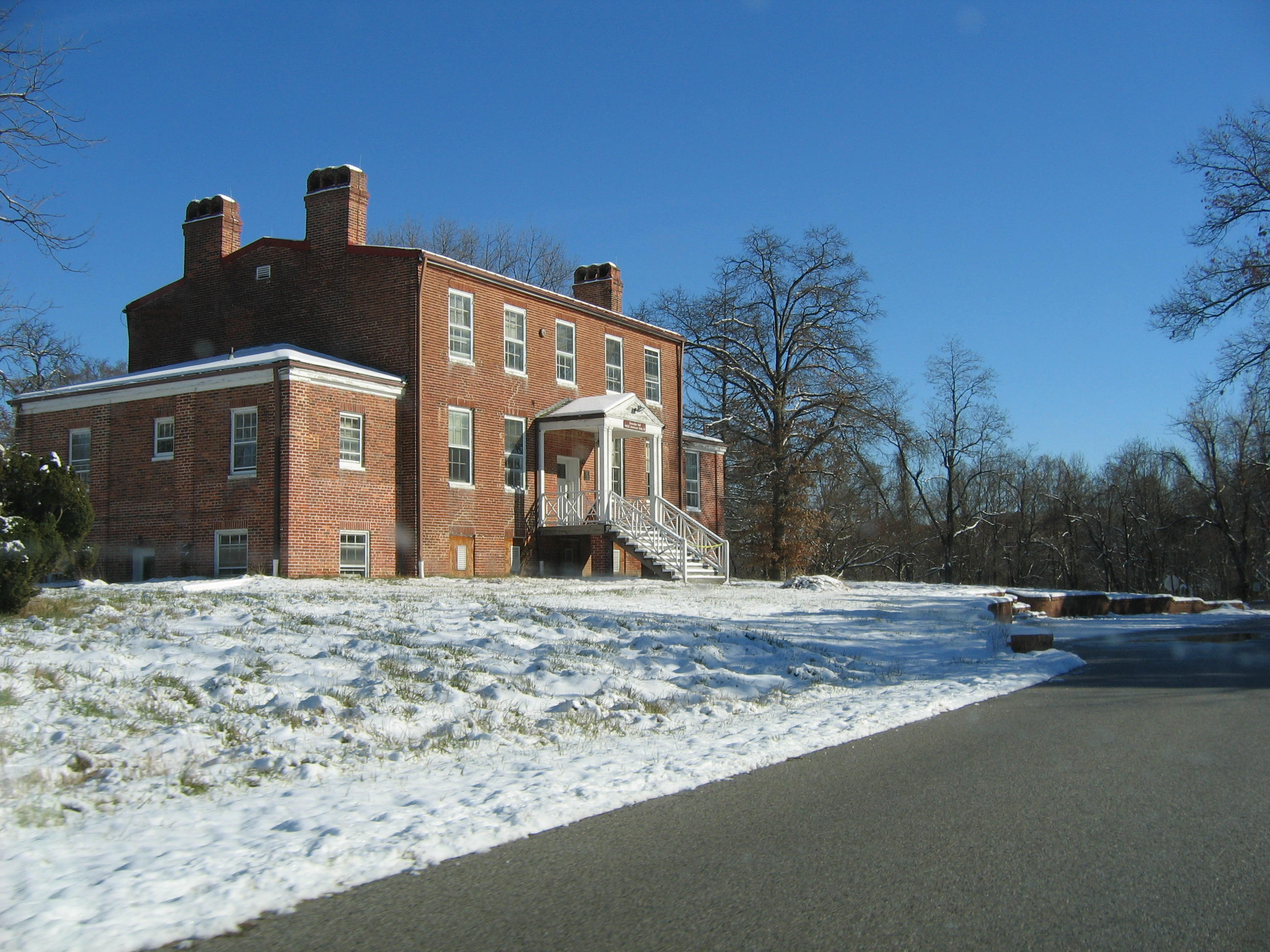
- Interactive map of the Snowden Hall area

General information
- Type: House
- Architectural style: Georgian
- Location: Patuxent Wildlife Research Center, Laurel, Maryland
- Coordinates: 39°3′13″N 76°49′6″W
- Construction started: ca. 1820
- Governing body: Patuxent Wildlife Research Center

Snowden Hall is a historic house located on the grounds of the Patuxent Wildlife Research Center, outside Laurel in Prince George's County, Maryland, United States. It stands on open rolling ground approximately 3/4-mile west of the Patuxent River.

== History ==
Snowden Hall is a two-story Georgian brick house and was the home of three generations of the Snowden family. The 260-acre (110 ha) parcel of land on which it stands was the nucleus of the Snowden family plantation. The family were slave holders and more than a hundred slaves were known to gather at Snowden Hall to listen to Bible readings on Sunday mornings.

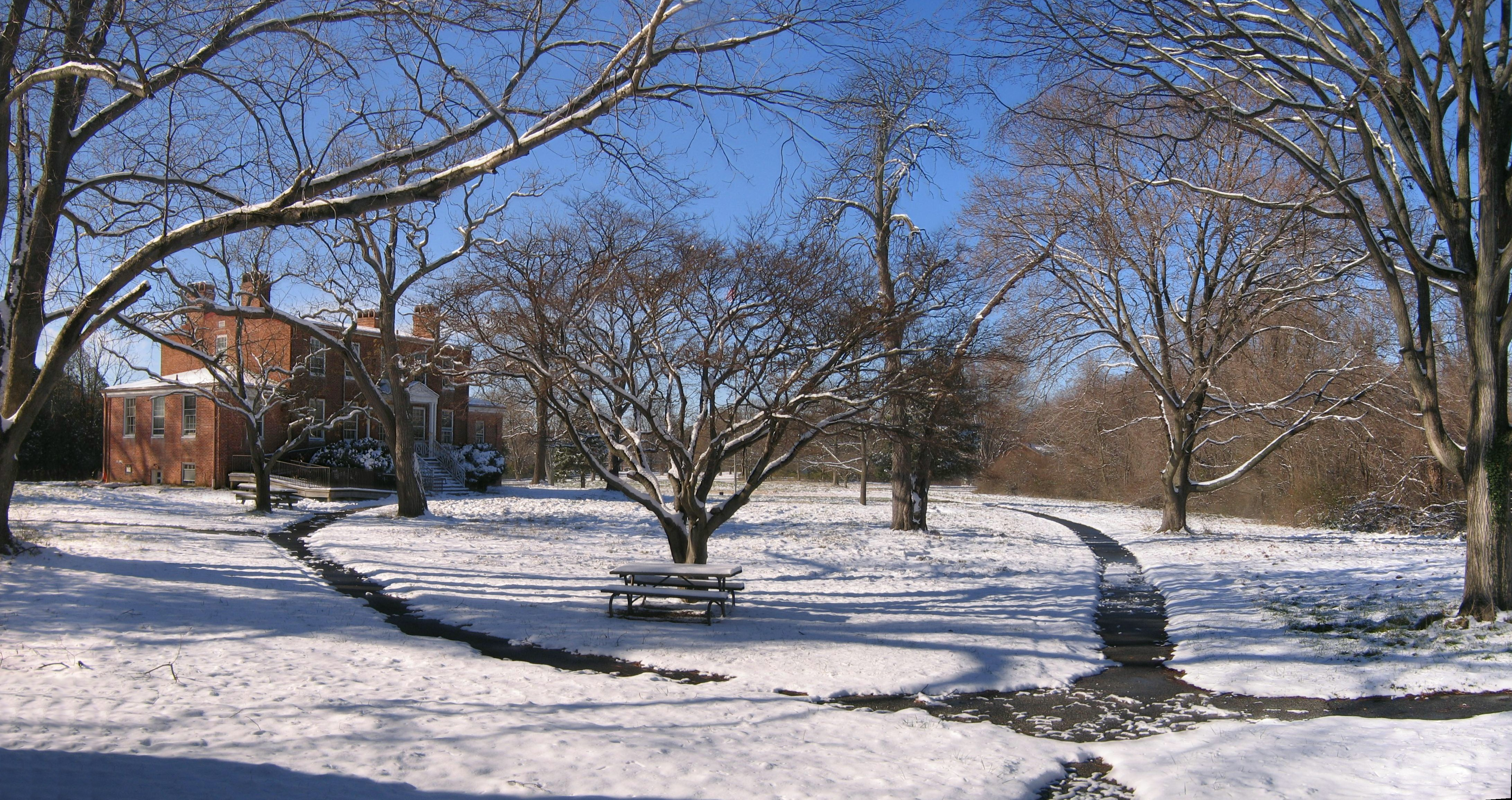
Grounds of Snowden Hall, in winter

The original Snowden Hall was constructed by Richard Snowden in the 18th century. The site is a portion of a 10,000-acre (4,000 ha) land grant from King Charles II. Sometime between 1812 and 1816 the Hall burned and was rebuilt as "Rose Cottage." Rose Cottage was subsequently raised to a full two stories in the 1850s. Former slave quarters and a large barn were on the east side of the property into the 1930s.

The property was purchased and renovated for government use in 1936, first as apartments and later as an office building. The low flanking wings were built at that time using bricks from the recently purchased pre-Civil War Duvall plantation house "Gladswood" on the southern section of the research center lands.

== See also ==
- Patuxent Research Refuge
