= Duvall Bridge (Laurel, Maryland) =

Truss bridge

- Coordinates: 39.045003°N 76.788812°W
- Carries: Lago road, (former) Telegraph Road
- Crosses: Patuxent River
- Named for: Charles Duvall
- Owner: United States Department of the Interior
- Heritage status: Historic American Engineering Record, Maryland Historical Trust

Characteristics
- Design: Pratt truss
- Material: Steel

History
- Constructed by: unknown
- Construction end: 1907
- Rebuilt: 2012 (reopened)
- Closed: 1977

Duvall Bridge is an historic single-lane bridge over the Patuxent River near Laurel, Maryland.

A bridge has been located on this site since the mid-18th century although the current bridge is estimated to have been constructed circa 1907. The first bridge was constructed to serve the mill at the 450-acre plantation of Dr. Charles Duvall "Goodwood" renamed later to "Gladswood". The Duvall family had arrived in Anne Arundel County with arrival of Mareen Duvall in 1650. Mareen Duvall's Middle Plantation is downriver on the same path, now called Davidsonville Road. The Steel bridge was constructed in 1907. The bridge provided water crossing for the main Baltimore-Washington telegraph lines following "telegraph road". In 1936, the Patuxent Wildlife Research Center was created on the land, and the bridge was transferred to the federal government in 1941. A plaque was installed in 1966 by the Duvall society. The bridge was condemned in 1977 after flooding. The bridge was rehabilitated in 2012 and serves as a connection between the central tract and north tract of Patuxent Research Refuge.

Although a common bridge type, Duvall Bridge is one of only two surviving truss bridges in Prince George's County, along with Governor's Bridge. The Duvall bridge has a cross braced deck for wooden planking. The bridge has a plaque noting the Anne Arundel county commissioners of 1907:

- G.D. Ridout
- J.H. Wayson
- J.M. Beard
- H.D. Cook
- J.S. Smith
- W.T. Wells
- A.A. Shipley

== See also ==
- Governor's Bridge (Patuxent River)
