= Patuxent Wildlife Research Center =

Wildlife research center in Maryland, United States

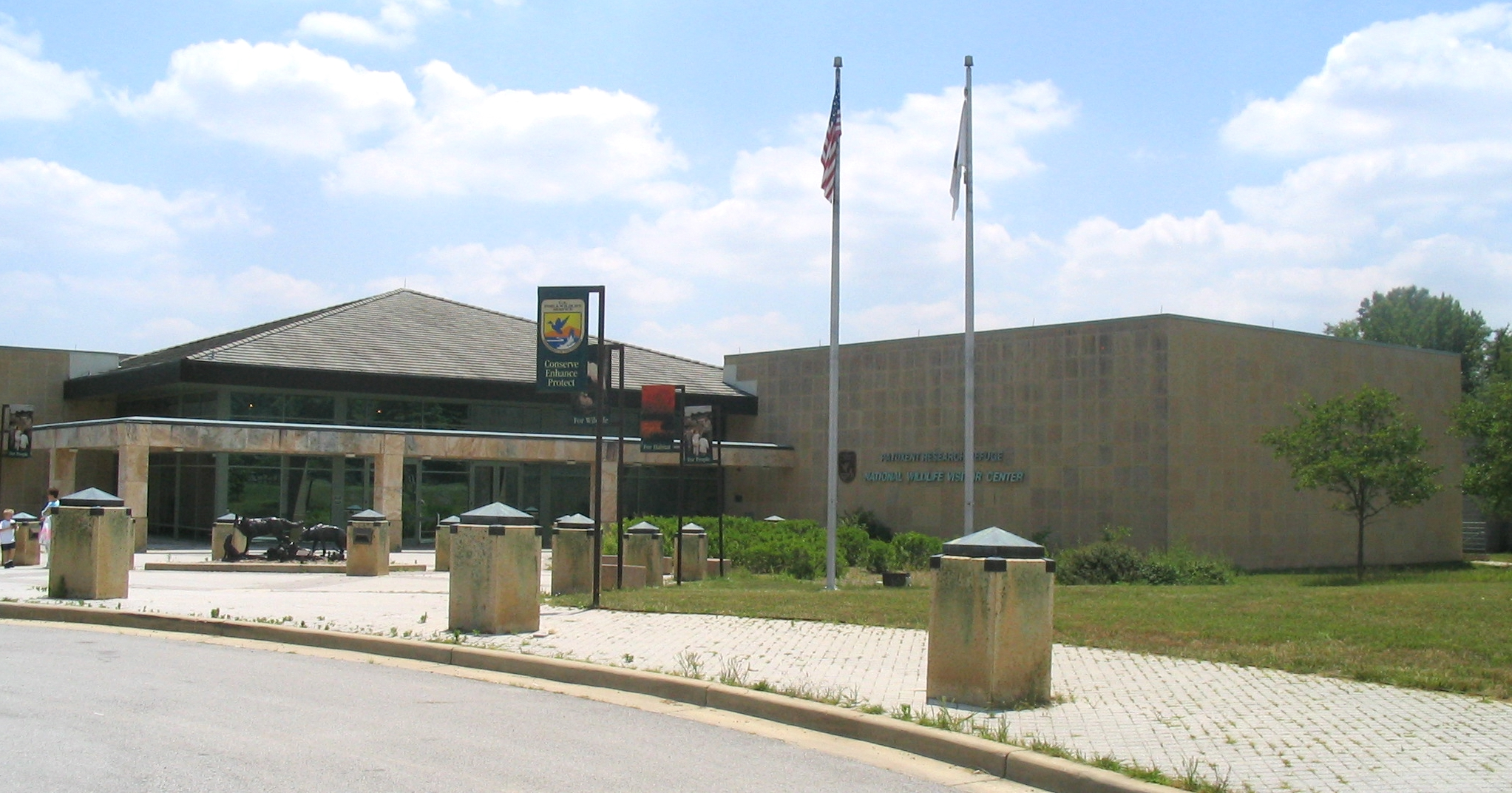
- National Wildlife Visitor Center (FWS) 10901 Scarlet Tanager Loop Laurel, MD 20708

- Location within the United States Location within Maryland
- Location: Prince George's County, Maryland, United States
- Nearest city: Laurel, Maryland
- Coordinates: 39°01′35″N 76°47′56″W
- Governing body: U.S. Geological Survey
- Website: EESC/Patuxent

The Patuxent Wildlife Research Center is a biological research center in Laurel, Maryland, part of the Eastern Ecological Science Center (EESC) of the U.S. Geological Survey (USGS). The EESC is the largest of the 15 USGS research centers. The Patuxent facility is located on the grounds of the 12,841-acre (51.97 km^{2}) Patuxent Research Refuge, managed by the U.S. Fish and Wildlife Service (FWS). This is the only National Wildlife Refuge in the United States initially established to support wildlife research.

== Mission ==
Since its establishment in 1936 as the first wildlife experiment station in the United States, the Patuxent Wildlife Research Center has been responsible for wildlife and applied environmental research, for transmitting research findings to those responsible for managing the United States natural resources, and for providing technical assistance in implementing research findings to improve natural resource management.

Patuxent's scientists have been responsible for advances in natural resource conservation, especially in such areas as migratory birds, national monitoring programs for amphibians and birds, wildlife population analysis, waterfowl harvest, habitat management, wetlands, coastal zone and flood plain management, contaminants, endangered species, urban wildlife, ecosystem management, and management of national parks and national wildlife refuges.

The Center develops and manages national inventory and monitoring programs and is responsible for the North American Bird Banding Program and the leadership of other national bird monitoring programs. The Center's scientific and technical assistance publications, wildlife databases, and electronic media are used nationally and worldwide in managing biological resources.

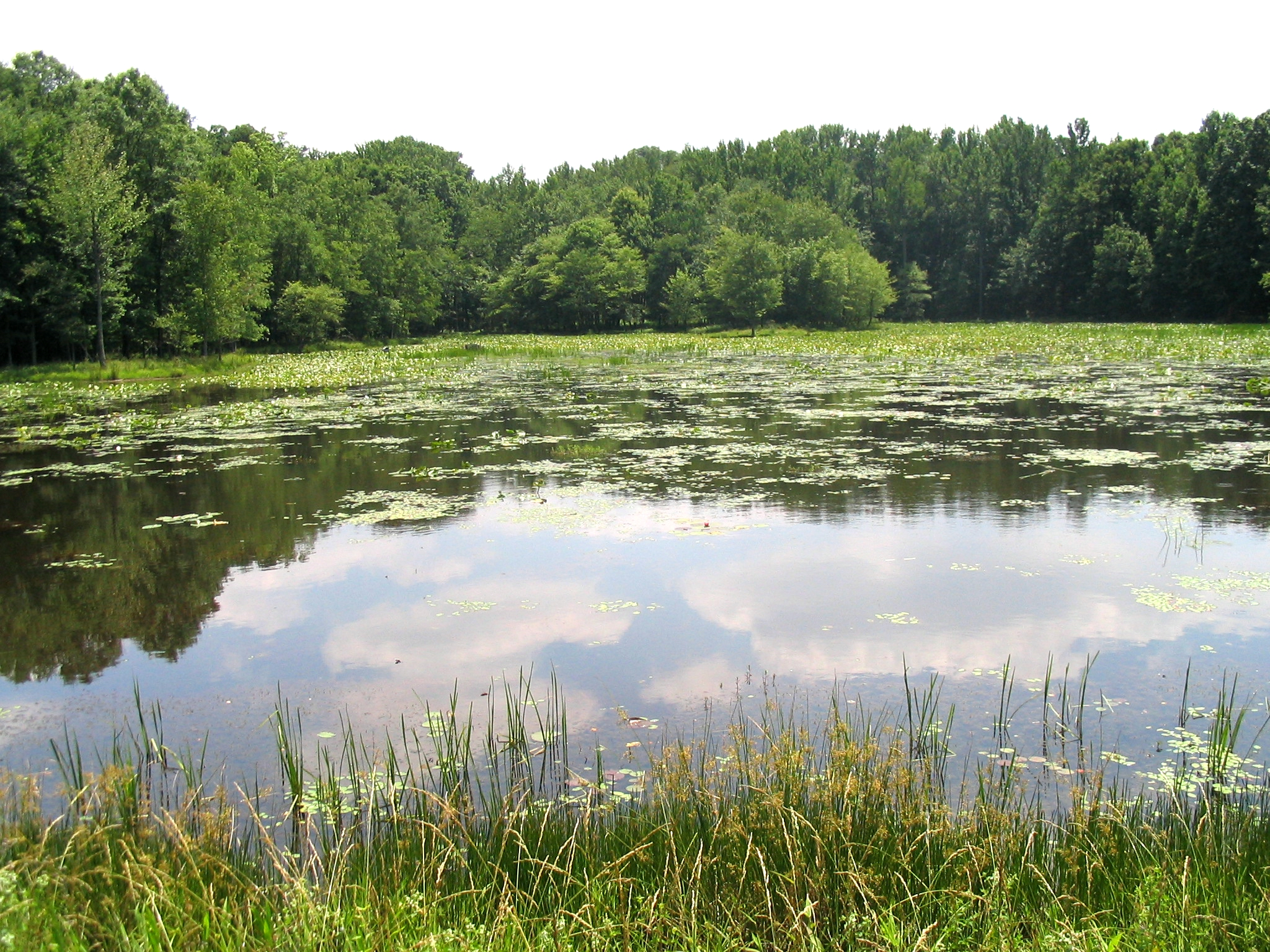
The research center hosts a wide variety of wildlife.

The center is a federal research facility that supports programs in the United States Department of the Interior. The USGS Biological Resources Division, of which the Center is a part, works with others to provide the information needed to manage the United States' biological resources.

The center also receives funds directly from agencies benefiting from its research and from other partner organizations, such as those co-located at its Laurel headquarters.

== History ==
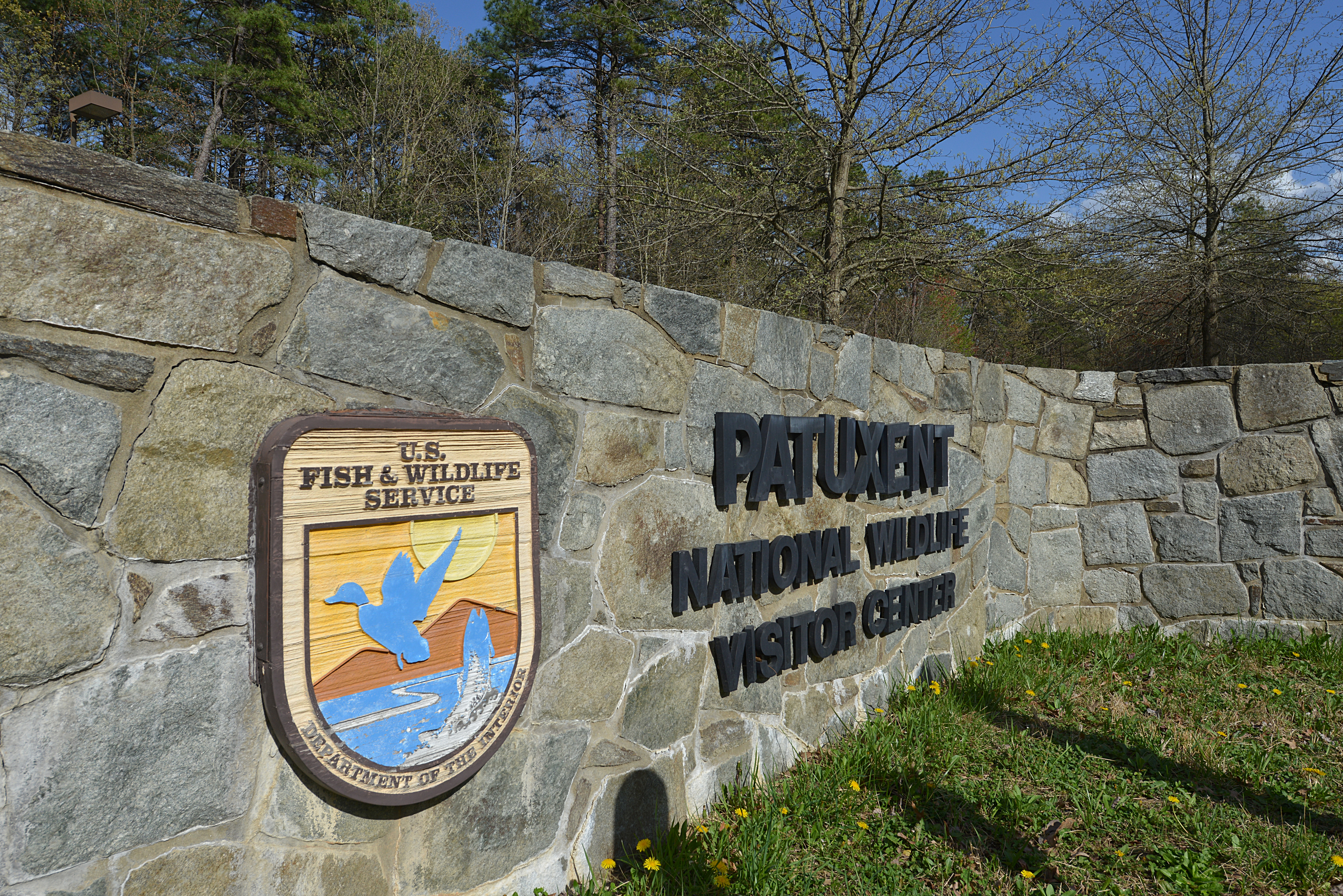
Patuxent National Wildlife Visitor Center entrance sign

The land that currently encompasses the 12,841 acres (51.97 km^{2}) of Patuxent Research Refuge was primarily used for farming from the colonial period until at least World War I. Prominent landowners, such as the Snowden and Duvall families, owned significant portions of land during the colonial era and well into the 19th century. The legacy of the Snowden family can still be found in two historic homes in the area, one of which (Snowden Hall) is on Patuxent Research Refuge property. In addition to these dwellings, there still exist 19 cemeteries between the center and Fort Meade whose headstones bear the inscriptions of both the Snowdens and Duvalls, in addition to lesser-known surnames such as the Woodwards, Donaldsons, and Waters families.

Almost all of the 8,100 acres (33 km^{2}) that make up what is now called the "North Tract" area (the Patuxent River bisects the refuge into the North and Central/South Tracts) were transferred in 1991 from the Defense Department's Fort Meade landholdings. Long before the area became a densely wooded haven for wildlife amidst a heavily populated urban corridor, the old Duvall and Lemons Bridges linked Prince Georges and Anne Arundel Counties. The former still exists as a newer bridge rebuilt in the 1940s, whereas cement posts along either side of the river are the only vestiges of Lemon's Bridge. The old Telegraph Road, which utilized Duvall Bridge, once linked Baltimore and Washington, and today it is still possible to see century-old telegraph poles along the road in both the Central and South Tracts.

In 1946, scientists found that DDT pesticide tests were killing wildlife in tree canopies and causing significant fish kills in the Patuxent River.

In 1996, three women were murdered near the Patuxent Wildlife Research Center. One of the men involved, Dustin Higgs, was executed for the crime.

In 2017, the Patuxent Wildlife Research Center ended its 51-year effort to breed and train whooping cranes for release due to budget cuts. The flock of 75 birds were moved to the International Crane Foundation and the Calgary Zoo for continued breeding.

== Fort Meade ==
Fort George G. Meade, an active Army base, is located near the research center. In October 1991, 7,600 acres (31 km^{2}) were transferred from the base to the Patuxent National Research Refuge. In January 1993, another 500 acres (2.0 km^{2}) was transferred as part of the Defense Appropriation Bills for 1991 and 1992, respectively.

A September 2007 environmental impact report described the expansion of Fort Meade, and particularly the proposed two additional 18-hole golf courses, as a "significant threat to the biological and territorial integrity of the Patuxent Research Refuge, a unique national interest in the forefront of scientific research and protection." In response, the Army said that it was taking steps to limit the environmental damage but that the golf courses were needed for "maintaining the quality of life for soldiers and their families."

The historic golf course that had served as the centerpiece of Fort Meade since 1950 closed on May 1, 2012, and, as of June 2022, no new golf courses were under construction.

== See also ==
- Patuxent River State Park
- List of parks in the Baltimore–Washington metropolitan area
