= Dustin Higgs =

American criminal (1972–2021)

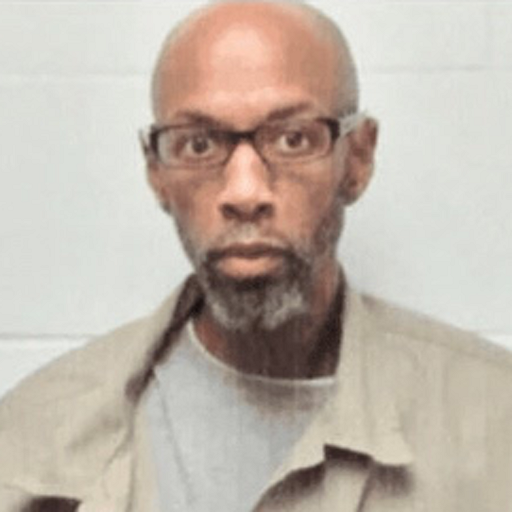
- Born: March 10, 1972; Poughkeepsie, New York, U.S.
- Died: January 16, 2021 (aged 48); USP Terre Haute, Indiana, U.S.
- Status: Executed by lethal injection
- Motive: One of the victims rebuffed his sexual advances
- Convictions: Federal; First degree murder (3 counts); Kidnapping resulting in death (3 counts); Use of a firearm during a crime of violence (3 counts); Possession of cocaine with intent to distribute Maryland; Assault; Reckless endangerment
- Penalty: Death (January 3, 2001)
- Accomplices: Willis Mark Haynes; Victor Gloria

Details
- Victims: 3
- Date: January 27, 1996
- Locations: Patuxent Research Refuge, Prince George's County, Maryland
- Date apprehended: December 1998
- Imprisoned at: United States Penitentiary, Terre Haute

Dustin John Higgs (March 10, 1972 – January 16, 2021) was an American man who was executed by the United States federal government, having been convicted and sentenced to death for the January 1996 murders of three women in Maryland. Tamika Black, Tanji Jackson, and Mishann Chinn were all shot and killed near the Patuxent Wildlife Research Center, on the Patuxent Research Refuge in Prince George's County, Maryland. Because this is classed as federal land, he was tried by the federal government in addition to the state of Maryland. His case, conviction, and execution were the subject of multiple controversies.

The main contention was that Higgs did not personally kill any of the three victims, but waited in a vehicle nearby. The man who shot them, Willis Mark Haynes, was sentenced to life imprisonment without parole plus 45 years. The prosecution argued that although Higgs did not kill anyone, he was the ringleader, ordering and bullying Haynes. Higgs and his defense team maintained his innocence to the end, arguing that he was merely a witness, and was set up by Haynes and another witness, Victor Gloria. In 2012, Haynes swore in an affidavit that Higgs did not force or threaten him into killing any of the victims.

Higgs was executed via lethal injection on January 16, 2021, becoming the thirteenth and final person executed by the federal government during the first presidency of Donald Trump, when federal executions returned after a 17-year hiatus. Trump's first presidency ended only four days later. Higgs remains the most recent person executed by the United States federal government and the last before President Joe Biden's 2024 near-complete commutation of remaining federal death row inmates.

== Early life ==
Higgs was born in Poughkeepsie, New York, on March 10, 1972, to Alfonso Higgs and Marilyn M. Bennett Higgs. When Dustin was 8, his mother was diagnosed with cancer. She died two years later, in 1982. Friends and relatives saw a big change in his mood after this. He moved to Laurel, Maryland, in 1991. By 1996, he was married and had a son.

== Murders ==
On the evening of January 26, 1996, Higgs, Willis Haynes, and Victor Gloria drove from Higgs' apartment in Laurel, Maryland, to Washington, D.C., to pick up Tamika Black, Tanji Jackson, and Mishann Chinn. Dates had been arranged for each of the men and women and the groups had agreed to meet and hang out together. The six of them traveled in Higgs' vehicle, a blue Mazda MPV van, and returned to his apartment to drink alcohol, smoke marijuana, and listen to music. The partying continued into the early hours of January 27.

At some point during the night, an argument broke out and the women left the apartment. Higgs, Haynes, and Gloria then headed out after them, with Higgs driving his own vehicle and Haynes sitting in the front passenger seat. Gloria was sitting in the back of the van behind Higgs. Higgs drove his van to the side of the road where the women were walking. They offered the women a ride home, which they willingly accepted. The women got into the back of the vehicle and Higgs drove out of Laurel. Neighbors in the area reported hearing and seeing the three women laughing and talking in the early hours of that morning.

Higgs drove his van along a state road on to the Patuxent Research Refuge and stopped the vehicle near the Patuxent Wildlife Research Center. The women got out of the van and Haynes exited the vehicle. Haynes then fatally shot each of the three women with a silver .38 caliber pistol before returning to the van and closing the door. The gun was then thrown into the Anacostia River. Early on January 27, a passing motorist found the women's bodies and contacted the Park Police. Jackson's day planner was found at the scene with Higgs' nickname and telephone number recorded in it. According to the medical examiner, Jackson and Black had each been shot once in the chest and once in the back. Chinn had been shot once in the back of the head.

== Fraud investigation and drug trafficking conviction ==
The murders went unsolved for nearly three years. Higgs was first questioned about them in March 1996 at his apartment. He acknowledged that he had known Jackson and had talked to her the night before she died. He was arrested and his apartment searched, as he was suspected of an unrelated bank fraud violation. Police found cocaine and firearms in his apartment. On May 12, 1997, he pleaded guilty to possession with intent to distribute cocaine. He was sentenced to 17 years in a federal prison.

== Revelation and murder trial ==
In October 1998, Gloria and Haynes were arrested on unrelated drug charges. After being questioned, police learned of more details surrounding the murders. On December 21, Higgs and Haynes were indicted by a federal grand jury on charges of first degree murder, kidnapping resulting in death, and use of a firearm during a crime of violence. Higgs was already in custody at the time, serving his 17-year trafficking sentence. The government announced they would seek death sentences for both Higgs and Haynes.

After this revelation, Higgs and Haynes were tried separately in 2000. Gloria, who was a suspect in the July 18, 1998, murder of Martrelle Creighton, whom witnesses said he stabbed to death during a fight in Baltimore, cut a deal with the federal government. In exchange for not being charged with Creighton's murder and pleading guilty to lesser charges of being an accessory-after-the-fact to the murders, he agreed to testify against Higgs and Haynes. Two of Gloria's accomplices in the murder pleaded guilty to second degree assault and were sentenced to time served, while a third accomplice pleaded guilty to second degree murder and was sentenced to 20 years in prison with all but five years suspended. Gloria's testimony was the main piece of evidence presented during Higgs' trial. He was sentenced to seven years in prison.

=== Federal prosecution's argument ===
The prosecution's version of events was that Higgs got into a heated argument with Tanji Jackson at his apartment on the evening of January 26, 1996. Jackson had supposedly taken a knife from the kitchen and threatened Higgs after she rejected his alleged sexual advances towards her. After the argument, the women left the apartment enraged. According to Gloria, Jackson made some kind of threat as she left the apartment. As Higgs watched the women leave, he saw Jackson appear to write down his license plate number. According to Gloria, this angered Higgs, who was concerned that she knew people who might retaliate against him.

The men then left the apartment and headed after them in Higgs' van. They pulled over and offered the women a ride home, which they accepted. The prosecution accepts that they were not forced into the vehicle or taken against their will. Higgs did not drive the correct way back to Washington, D.C., and instead drove to the Patuxent Research Refuge. Higgs pulled over at a secluded location and ordered the women out of the van. The women then asked if they were being forced to walk home to which Higgs responded, "something like that." As the women got out of the van, Higgs took out a handgun and handed it to Haynes. According to Haynes' testimony, Higgs then said to him "better make sure they're dead." Haynes then exited the van and Gloria heard gunshots. He witnessed Haynes shoot one of the women in the chest. After the women were killed and the gun was disposed of, Higgs drove back to his apartment with Haynes and Gloria. Gloria was later dropped off at a fast-food restaurant, where he was told to keep his mouth shut.

=== Defense's argument ===
The defense argued that Higgs' alleged reason for wanting the women killed — Jackson rejecting his sexual advances and possibly knowing people who may have retaliated against him — was a very weak motive for ordering three murders. They said the idea that the women willingly got into the van for a lift home also contradicted the idea that Jackson was angry at Higgs and would seek revenge. The defense claims that the real reason the women were killed was because they owed Haynes and some of his associates drug money. Two inmates at the Charles County Detention Center said Haynes had claimed to them to have a much bigger role in the killings. One argued Haynes was more of a partner to Higgs than someone who followed orders. One said the victims owed him drug money and that Haynes "had to kill" one of the women because she had been trying to set him up.

Higgs' lawyer said he only learned of the witnesses after reviewing Haynes' trial record, by which time Higgs had already been sentenced to death. The evidence would supposedly have made both Haynes and Higgs equally culpable in the eyes of the jury, and the failure to provide the statements violated the Brady rule. According to the defense, both Gloria and Haynes repeatedly changed their stories, with Haynes admitting in 2012 in a sworn affidavit that Higgs had not forced or bullied him into doing anything, something the prosecution had claimed at Higgs' trial.

=== Verdict ===
Ultimately, Higgs and Haynes were found guilty of all of the charges. The jury spared Haynes' life. On August 24, 2000, he was sentenced to nine concurrent life terms without parole, plus 45 years. The federal judge at Haynes' trial claimed he had shown no remorse for the killings. As of June 2022, he was incarcerated at United States Penitentiary, Beaumont.

On October 26, 2000, Higgs was sentenced to death by an all-male jury, becoming the first person from Maryland to be sentenced to death in the federal court system. He was formally sentenced to death by a federal judge on January 3, 2001. Higgs was incarcerated at United States Penitentiary, Terre Haute. He exhausted his appeals on December 10, 2012, but at the time, the U.S. federal government had a de facto moratorium on capital punishment. He received an execution date after U.S. Attorney General William Barr ordered the resumption of federal executions in 2019.

On November 22, 2000, Gloria was sentenced to eighty-four months in a federal prison. He was released on February 4, 2006, serving a total of just over five years and two months in prison.

=== State prosecution ===
In April 1997, in a Maryland state court, Higgs submitted a guilty plea to reckless endangerment and assault charges.

=== Disapproval of result ===
Multiple controversies surround Higgs' case. Firstly, he was sentenced to death despite not personally shooting or killing any of the three women. The case against him was mainly built on the testimonies of Gloria and Haynes, who had both cut deals and changed their stories multiple times. The fact the murders were committed on federal land further complicated things. Higgs was tried by the federal government in addition to state of Maryland. Had the murders occurred farther down the same road, the women would not have been killed on the Patuxent Research Refuge, and Higgs would have been tried only by the state of Maryland and not by the federal government. If he had been tried by the state of Maryland, based on state law, he would not have been eligible for the death penalty. The state of Maryland also abolished the death penalty in 2013, with all remaining death row inmates resentenced to life without parole. Prior to the abolition, the last execution in Maryland occurred in 2005, when Wesley Baker was executed for the June 1991 murder of 49-year-old Jane Tyson.

== Execution ==
The execution was controversial, in part because Higgs was executed during a lame-duck period. He had also tested positive for COVID-19 a few weeks prior. Higgs's attorney raised the concern that COVID-19 had caused him lung damage, and that during the execution, he would experience "a sensation of drowning akin to waterboarding." The execution was postponed by a federal judge's ruling on January 12. The Supreme Court voted 6–3, late on January 15, to let it proceed.

At 1:23 a.m. on January 16, 2021, Higgs, 48, was executed by lethal injection of pentobarbital at the United States Penitentiary in Terre Haute, Indiana. His last words were "I'd like to say I am an innocent man. I did not order the murders." He mentioned each of the three murder victims by name. He became the third and last inmate to be executed by the U.S. federal government in January, after convicted murderers Lisa Montgomery and Corey Johnson, who were executed on January 13 and 14, respectively.

Higgs was the thirteenth and final person executed by the United States federal government during the first presidency of Donald Trump. He also remains the most recent person executed by the federal government as a whole. He is buried at Poughkeepsie Rural Cemetery in his hometown of Poughkeepsie, New York.

== See also ==
- Brandon Bernard
- Execution of Nathaniel Woods
- Felony murder and the death penalty in the United States
- List of most recent executions by jurisdiction
- Capital punishment by the United States federal government
- List of people executed by the United States federal government
- List of people executed in the United States in 2021

Executions carried out by the United States federal government
Preceded by Corey Johnson January 14, 2021	Dustin Higgs; January 16, 2021	Succeeded by most recent
Executions carried out in the United States
Preceded by Corey Johnson – Federal government January 14, 2021	Dustin Higgs – Federal government January 16, 2021	Succeeded by Quintin Jones – Texas May 19, 2021
