= Richer Than I Ever Been =

Studio album by Rick Ross
- Released: December 10, 2021
- Length: 42:09
- Label: Maybach; Epic
- Producer: AraabMuzik; Bink; Boi-1da; Carnage; Cheeze; Coleman; DJ Toomp; Don Cannon; Fuse; Infamous; Jahaan Sweet; Jonny Shipes; Lyle Leduff; Nick Brongers; StreetRunner; Tarik Azzouz; Timbaland; Vinylz

Rick Ross chronology
Port of Miami 2 (2019)	Richer Than I Ever Been (2021)	Too Good to Be True (2023)

Singles from Richer Than I Ever Been
- 1. "Outlawz" Released: November 12, 2021; 2. "Little Havana" Released: December 3, 2021

Richer Than I Ever Been is the eleventh studio album by American rapper Rick Ross. It was released on December 10, 2021, through Maybach Music Group and Epic Records. The album features guest appearances from Willie Falcon, The-Dream, Benny the Butcher, Wale, Future, DreamDoll, Yungeen Ace, Major Nine, Blxst, Jazmine Sullivan, 21 Savage, and Wiz Khalifa. The production is handled by Boi-1da, Timbaland, Bink, Don Cannon, Jonny Shipes, Carnage, Infamous, AraabMuzik, and Fuse, among others. It serves as the follow-up to Ross' previous album, Port of Miami 2 (2019). The deluxe edition was released on January 28, 2022, Ross' 46th birthday. It features additional guest appearances from AZ and Anderson .Paak.

== Background ==
On November 23, 2021, Rick Ross was interviewed by Complex. He referred to the album as his "best" and compared some songs on the album to his song, "Triple Beam Dreams", from his fifth studio album, God Forgives, I Don't (2012). He also explained how he feels that Richer Than I Ever Been is different from his previous albums:

It has more lyrical wordplay. I'm on some shit. I felt there was some shit I could do different coming off of Port of Miami 2. So on Richer Than I Ever Been, maybe the first five records could be overwhelming with the way the production is and the extent I'm going to with the wordplay, the rap shit. That's most definitely a difference, versus me giving records that's just about the vibe.

== Release and promotion ==
Ross announced the title of the album in August 2020 in an interview with Ebro from Apple Music, with a plan for it to release that year. The tracklist was revealed in December 2021. The lead single, "Outlawz", which features American singer-songwriter Jazmine Sullivan and Atlanta-based rapper 21 Savage, was released on November 12, 2021. The second and final single, "Little Havana", which features Cuban former drug kingpin Willie Falcon and American singer-songwriter The-Dream, was released on December 3, 2021.

== Critical reception ==
Professional ratings
Aggregate scores
Source	Rating
AnyDecentMusic?	6.3/10
Metacritic	66/100
Review scores
Source	Rating
AllMusic	3/5 stars
Clash	7/10
Exclaim!	7/10
HipHopDX	3.3/5
NME	3/5 stars
Pitchfork	6.7/10
RapReviews	5/10
Rolling Stone	3.5/5 stars
Spectrum Culture	60%

Richer Than I Ever Been was met with generally positive reviews. At Metacritic, which assigns a normalized rating out of 100 to reviews from professional publications, the album received an average score of 66, based on eight reviews. Aggregator AnyDecentMusic? gave it 6.3 out of 10, based on their assessment of the critical consensus.

Will Dukes of Rolling Stone praised the album, stating, "On Richer Than I've Ever Been, Ross proves that his highfalutin aspirations are a major part of his authenticity". Reviewing the album for Exclaim!, Wesley McLean stated, "This album won't change anyone's opinion of Rick Ross, but fans will get everything they love about his music: some standout tracks, an abundance of charismatic luxury raps and a slew of incredible, lavish instrumentals for you to cruise around to". Clash critic Robin Murray said, "With features from Blxst, Yungeen Ace, Future, and Wale – amongst others – Richer Than I Ever Been is shamelessly entertaining, the work of an artist who knows what his audience wants to hear". Dylan Green of Pitchfork said, "Richer Than I Ever Been is far from Ross' most vital album, but few rappers can make what amounts to a status update feel like you're right next to him, living out the story brick by brick". Ben Brutocao of HipHopDX wrote, "If slightly unexciting, Richer Than I Ever Been is a testament to the lasting talent of the MMG commandant, even if he doesn't break new ground".

In a lukewarm review, NME's Will Lavin wrote, "There's nothing complex about what Rick Ross does. ... Ross consistently portrays the 'old Rozay', garnering successful results more times than not. Sometimes simplicity is key: if it ain't broke don't fix it". Andy Kellman of AllMusic said, "This is a perfectly adequate Ross LP differentiated by its mix of collaborators more than anything else". In a mixed review, RapReviews's Michael G. Barilleaux stated: "Overall, aside from some promising lines and one, maybe two standout tracks, Richer Than I Ever Been is an album that predictably falls short. It simply features too many weak beats backing up bars that often do more to bore than they do to convey a sense of skill or originality."

== Track listing ==
Richer Than I Ever Been track listing
No.	Title	Writer(s)	Producer(s)	Length
1.	"Little Havana" (featuring Willie Falcon and The-Dream)	William Roberts II; Willy Falcon; Terius Nash; Matthew Samuels; Lisa Stansfield; Andrew Morris; Ian Devaney	Boi-1da; Nick Brongers; Jahaan Sweet	3:46
2.	"The Pulitzer"	Roberts; Timothy Mosley	Timbaland	2:18
3.	"Rapper Estates" (featuring Benny the Butcher)	Roberts; Jeremie Pennick; Anderson Hernandez; Samuels; Scotty Coleman	Vinylz; Boi-1da; Coleman	3:23
4.	"Marathon"	Roberts; Alain Goraguer; Samuel Saint-Jean; Nicholas Warwar; Tarik Azzouz	StreetRunner; Azzouz	3:42
5.	"Warm Words in a Cold World" (featuring Wale and Future)	Roberts; Olubowale Akintimehin; Nayvadius Wilburn; Roosevelt Harrell III; Herbert Magidson; Allie Wrubel	Bink	3:40
6.	"Wiggle" (featuring DreamDoll)	Roberts; Tabatha Robinson; Donald Cannon; Lyle Leduff; Saint-Jean	Don Cannon; Leduff	2:41
7.	"Can't Be Broke" (featuring Yungeen Ace and Major Nine)	Roberts; Keyanta Bullard; Chad Thomas; Jonathan Shapiro	Jonny Shipes	4:13
8.	"Made It Out Alive" (featuring Blxst)	Roberts; Matthew Burdette; Darryl McCorkell	Cheeze	3:38
9.	"Outlawz" (featuring Jazmine Sullivan and 21 Savage)	Roberts; Jazmine Sullivan; Shéyaa Abraham-Joseph; Diamanté Blackmon; Marco Rodriguez-Diaz, Jr.; Abraham Orellana; Camilo Cortés	Carnage; Infamous; AraabMuzik	4:49
10.	"Imperial High"	Roberts; Aldrin Davis	DJ Toomp	3:22
11.	"Richer Than I Ever Been"	Roberts; Byron Forest II; Dominic Howard; Christopher Hargreaves; Daniel Templeman; Edward Gooden; Matthew Roberts; Ruby Wood; Tarek Modi; Thomas Evans	Black Metaphor	2:52
12.	"Hella Smoke" (featuring Wiz Khalifa)	Roberts; Cameron Thomaz; Eduardo Earle; William Withers, Jr.; Clarence Scarborough; Robert Reese; Saint-Jean	Fuse	3:39
Total length:				42:03

Deluxe edition (bonus tracks)
No.	Title	Writer(s)	Producer(s)	Length
13.	"Vacheron" (featuring AZ)	Roberts; Anthony Cruz; Gregory Green; Akil King; Benedetto Rotondi; Joshua Lopez; Kaveh Rastegar; Olu Fann; Sam Barsh; Sonyae Covington; Stacy Barthe	The Heatmakerz	3:16
14.	"Revelations"	Roberts; Carl McCormick; Marvin Jackson; Mikki Farrow; Walter Sigler	Cardiak	3:35
15.	"Not for Nothing" (featuring Anderson .Paak)	Roberts; Brandon Anderson; Callum Connor; Stephen Feigenbaum; Paul Castelluzo	Connor; Johan Lenox	3:56
Total length:				52:57

== Personnel ==
- Fabian Marasciullo – mixing engineer (tracks 1, 9, 11, 12)
- Colin Leonard – mastering engineer (all tracks)
- Trop – recording engineer (tracks 1, 3, 10, 11)
- Eddie "eMIX" Hernandez – mixing engineer (tracks 2–4, 7, 8, 10), recording engineer (track 2)
- Amani "A $" Hernández – assistant engineer (tracks 2–4, 7, 8)
- Tomcat – recording engineer (tracks 4, 6–12)
- Bink – mixing engineer (track 5)
- John Rivers – mixing engineer (tracks 5, 6, 10)
- David Anthony "Tropdavinci" Bermudez – recording engineer (track 5)

== Charts ==
Chart performance for Richer Than I Ever Been
Chart (2021)	Peak position
Canadian Albums (Billboard)	96
US Billboard 200	22
US Top R&B/Hip-Hop Albums (Billboard)	10
