= Patuxent Research Refuge =

United States Fish and Wildlife Service operated wildlife refuge in Maryland

- IUCN category IV (habitat/species management area)
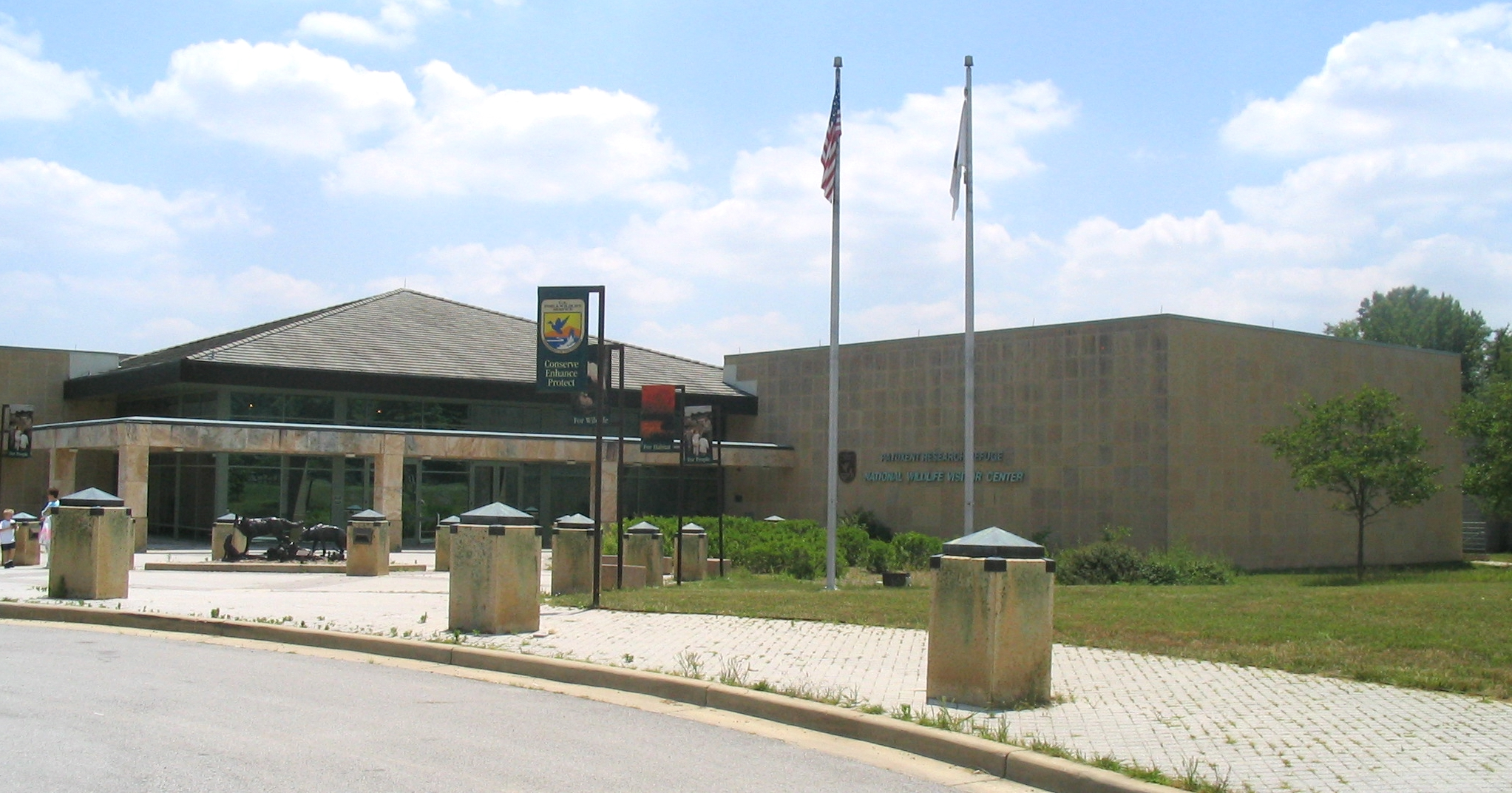
- National Wildlife Visitor Center 10901 Scarlet Tanager Loop Laurel, MD 20708

- Location within the United States Location within Maryland
- Location: Anne Arundel County, Prince George's County, Maryland, United States
- Nearest city: Laurel, Maryland
- Coordinates: 39°03′23″N 76°46′50″W
- Area: 12,800 acres (52 km^{2})
- Established: 1936
- Governing body: U.S. Fish and Wildlife Service
- Website: Patuxent Research Refuge

The Patuxent Research Refuge is a National Wildlife Refuge in Prince George's County, Maryland, United States, established in 1936 by executive order of President Franklin D. Roosevelt. It is the only National Wildlife Refuge in the country established to support wildlife research. With land surrounding the Patuxent and Little Patuxent Rivers between Washington, D.C., and Baltimore, Maryland, the refuge has grown from the original 2,670 acres (10.8 km^{2}) to its present size of over 12,800 acres (52 km^{2}) and encompasses land formerly managed by the Departments of Agriculture and Defense. Throughout decades of change, Patuxent's mission of conserving and protecting the nation's wildlife and habitat through research and wildlife management techniques has remained virtually unchanged.

About 1,100 species of vascular plants have been reported on the refuge.

Patuxent Research Refuge supports a wide diversity of wildlife in forest, meadow, and wetland habitats. The land is managed to maintain biological diversity and to protect and benefit native and migratory bird species. During the fall and spring migrations, many waterfowl species stop to rest and feed. Over 270 species of birds occur on the refuge. Bald eagles are occasionally seen feeding on the refuge. Increasing forest fragmentation in the area caused by urban development has damaged many populations of neotropical migratory birds. The refuge is one of the largest forested areas in the mid-Atlantic region and provides critical breeding habitat and wintering habitat for these species.

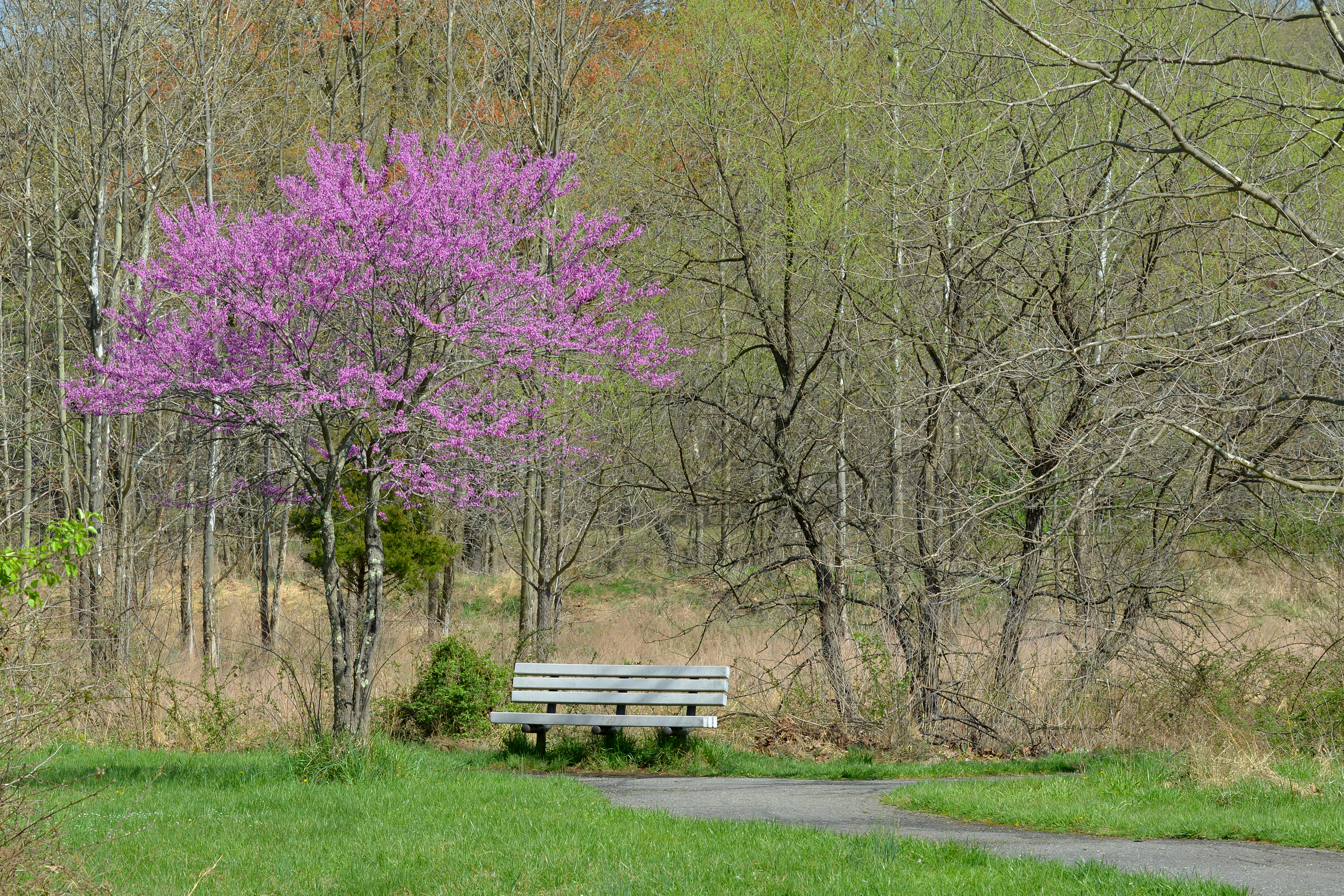
Redbud tree and bench at the South Tract of the Patuxent Research Refuge

Patuxent Research Refuge is divided into three areas: 1) North Tract, which offers hunting, fishing, wildlife observation, trails, and many interpretive programs; 2) Central Tract, where the headquarters for both the refuge and the USGS Patuxent Wildlife Research Center are located, as well as research study sites; and 3) South Tract, which has the National Wildlife Visitor Center, trails, and many educational programs. The North Tract and the National Wildlife Visitor Center are the only areas open for visitor activities.

The National Wildlife Visitor Center at the Patuxent Research Refuge is the nation's largest center for environmental science and education operated by the United States Department of the Interior.

In 1996, three women were murdered on the Patuxent Research Refuge near the Patuxent Wildlife Research Center. One of the men involved, Dustin Higgs, was executed for the crime.
