= Sal Magluta =

Cuban-American drug kingpin

- Born: Salvador Magluta; November 5, 1954 (age 72); Havana, Cuba
- Other names: "Sal" "El muchacho" (the boy) "El contador" (the accountant)
- Occupation: Drug Lord
- Known for: Drug lord Powerboat racer
- Status: Incarcerated
- Convictions: Falsifying documents (1996); Bribery, money laundering (2002)
- Penalty: 195 years imprisonment
- Accomplice: Willy Falcon

Details
- Imprisoned at: USP Allenwood, Gregg Township, PA

Salvador Magluta (born November 5, 1954) is a Cuban American former drug kingpin who along with his partner Willy Falcon, operated the most significant Cuban-American led cocaine trafficking organization in South Florida history. The duo became known as Los Muchachos, Spanish for "The Boys".

== Biography ==
=== Early life ===
Salvador "Sal" Magluta was born in Bejucal, Cuba. His relatives operated bakeries in Cuba, and after immigrating to Miami, the family continued that work by opening a bakery in Little Havana. Magluta immigrated to the United States during Operation Pedro Pan at age 7 and spent his childhood in Miami with extended family. He attended Miami Senior High School, where he met his longtime friend and future business partner Augusto "Willy" Falcón.

Magluta became a father at a young age, welcoming his first son while still in his late teens, and has remained closely connected to his family throughout his life.

=== 1996 trial ===
In April 1991, Salvador Magluta and Augusto "Willy" Falcón were indicted by a federal grand jury on multiple charges including operating a continuing criminal enterprise tied to the importation and distribution of over 75 tons of cocaine. The government framed them as the ringleaders of one of Florida's and perhaps the nation's largest drug-smuggling operations.

Magluta's defense team featured prominent attorneys Roy Black, Martin Weinberg, and Richard Martinez, his brother-in-law, while Falcón was represented by Albert Krieger, Susan Van Dusen, and D. Robert "Bobby" Wells. The trial, conducted before Judge Federico Moreno, grew into a media spectacle, with Miami news outlets and even national coverage focusing intently on their dramatic rise and the immense scale of the prosecution's allegations.

After four intense months, the jury returned a not guilty verdict on all charges a stunning outcome that stunned both prosecutors and the public. The Miami New Times called it perhaps "the largest drug-trafficking case ever to be lost by prosecutors in the state of Florida" and one of the biggest ever lost in the U.S. underscoring the trial's extraordinary public and political dimensions.

Critics argued that the prosecution seemed driven not just by evidence, but by a politically charged appetite for Miami-focused "drug war" victories especially amid the heated climate of the 1980s and early 1990s, when the Miami drug war was front-page news and a central challenge in the broader political narrative around the "war on drugs".

=== Post-trial and sentencing ===
Following their 1996 acquittal on drug-trafficking charges, Salvador Magluta and Augusto "Willy" Falcón continued to draw federal scrutiny. In 1999, prosecutors brought new indictments alleging that Magluta had engaged in a wide-ranging money-laundering and obstruction scheme, including allegations of paying jurors and witnesses during the earlier trial.

In 2002, after a lengthy trial, Magluta was convicted of conspiracy to launder money, witness and juror bribery, and obstruction of justice. He was initially sentenced to 205 years in federal prison, later reduced to 195 years on appeal.

He was first transferred to the United States Penitentiary in Marion, Illinois, and later moved to the United States Penitentiary, Florence ADX (the federal "supermax" facility in Colorado). Magluta retained attorneys Paul Petruzzi and Richard Klugh and sought a new trial, alleging numerous legal violations.

Over the years, Magluta has filed multiple appeals and motions seeking to reduce his sentence or improve his confinement conditions. In 2021, a widely reported petition for compassionate release cited serious health concerns, including chronic illnesses, mental health struggles, and prolonged solitary confinement.

Magluta's legal team and family continue to advocate for improved conditions and a reduced sentence, citing his long incarceration, declining health, and concerns about prison conditions at facilities including ADX Florence and USP Allenwood.

=== Juror bribery and obstruction case ===
Following the 1996 acquittal, the United States Attorney's Office launched an investigation into the finances of Magluta and Augusto "Willy" Falcón. Prosecutors alleged that members of the 1996 jury, including the jury foreman, had been bribed. Magluta, Falcón, several jurors, associates, and some attorneys were subsequently charged with various offenses connected to the alleged jury tampering.

In 2002, Magluta was tried and convicted on charges of conspiracy to launder money, witness and juror bribery, and obstruction of justice. He was found guilty on 12 of 39 counts.

The sentence imposed 205 years in federal prison, later reduced to 195 years on appeal was unusually severe compared to typical sentences for financial and obstruction crimes. Legal analysts noted that while the convictions involved bribery and laundering related to a major drug case, the term far exceeded the average federal sentence lengths for similar offenses.

=== Legal and health struggles ===
Magluta was acquitted of all drug-trafficking and conspiracy charges at his 1996 trial. However, he was subsequently convicted in 2002 on multiple counts of money laundering and obstruction of justice (including jury and witness bribery) linked to that earlier trial, receiving a 205-year sentence, later reduced to 195 years on appeal.

In recent years, Magluta has faced ongoing health concerns while in federal custody. His legal team has sought compassionate release, citing long periods of restrictive confinement and a decline in overall well-being.

== In popular culture ==
Magluta and his partner Falcon are the subjects of the 2021 documentary Cocaine Cowboys: The Kings of Miami. His name is mentioned in the 2006 film Miami Vice.
