= Willy Falcon =

American convicted drug lord (born 1955)

- Born: Augusto Guillermo Falcón; September 1, 1955 (age 71); Alquízar, La Habana Province, Cuba
- Other names: Doctor; Wilfredo Vargas
- Occupation: Drug lord
- Known for: Drug lord, Offshore powerboat racer
- Status: Released and deported from the United States
- Convictions: Illegal possession of a firearm (1997); Money laundering (2003)
- Penalty: 14 years imprisonment
- Accomplice: Sal Magluta

Augusto Guillermo "Willy" Falcon (born September 1, 1955) is a former drug kingpin who, along with his partner Sal Magluta, operated one of the most significant cocaine trafficking organizations in South Florida history.

== Biography ==
=== Speedboat racing ===
Falcon was a speedboat racing champion in the 1980s.

=== 1996 trial ===
Magluta, along with his partner, Falcon was indicted by a federal grand jury in April 1991 for a plethora of drug trafficking crimes, including operating a continuing criminal enterprise accused of importing and distributing over 75 tons of cocaine. Falcon was represented by Albert Krieger, Susan Van Dusen, and D. Robert "Bobby" Wells. His partner Magluta was represented by Roy Black, Martin Weinberg, and Richard Martinez (Magluta's brother in law). Both Magluta and Falcon were found not guilty after a lengthy trial before Judge Federico Moreno.

=== Gun conviction ===
In 1997 he was convicted for illegal possession of a firearm.

=== Juror bribery ===
Following the 1996 trial, the United States Attorney's Office directed an investigation into Magluta and Falcon's finances that ultimately revealed that members of their jury - including the jury foreman - had been bribed. Magluta, Falcon, several of the jurors, their associates and even some of their lawyers were ultimately charged with various criminal offenses arising from the conduct.

=== Guilty plea and deportation ===
In 2003 he pled guilty to a single count of money laundering in a plea deal with the government for a reduced 20-year sentence. After his 2017 release he was transferred to ICE custody. He was deported to the Dominican Republic, where he stayed for a short period of time, as the Dominican Republic authorities did not want his residence in the country. He was forced to flee the country and his whereabouts are currently unknown.

== In popular culture ==
Falcon and his partner Magluta are the subjects of the 2021 documentary Cocaine Cowboys: The Kings of Miami.

Rick Ross' single, "Little Havana", released December 2, 2021, opens with Ross and Falcon talking; Falcon claims to have helped build Miami into the city it is today and expresses appreciation to Rick Ross for "keeping my name alive in your music". Falcon participated in the filming of the song's music video, appearing in the opening and closing, while archival footage of him racing his speedboat appears near the midpoint.
