= Controlled Substances Penalties Amendments Act of 1984 =

Act signed in 1984 to enhance penalties for drug abuse

- Other short titles: Act for the Prevention and Punishment of the Crime of Hostage-Taking; Aircraft Sabotage Act; Armed Career Criminal Act of 1984; Bail Reform Act of 1984; Comprehensive Crime Control Act of 1984; Comprehensive Forfeiture Act of 1984; Counterfeit Access Device and Computer Fraud and Abuse Act of 1984; Credit Card Fraud Act of 1984; Criminal Justice Act Revision of 1984; Dangerous Drug Diversion Control Act of 1984; Department of Defense Appropriations Act, 1985; Department of the Interior and Related Agencies Appropriations Act, 1985; Department of Transportation and Related Agencies Appropriations Act, 1985; Foreign Assistance and Related Programs Appropriations Act, 1985; Insanity Defense Reform Act of 1984; John F. Kennedy Center Act Amendments of 1984; Justice Assistance Act of 1984; Juvenile Justice, Runaway Youth, and Missing Children's Act Amendments of 1984; Livestock Fraud Protection Act; Military Construction Appropriations Act, 1985; Missing Children's Assistance Act; National Narcotics Act; President's Emergency Food Assistance Act of 1984; Sentencing Reform Act of 1984; Trademark Counterfeiting Act of 1984; Victims of Crime Act of 1984; Witness Security Reform Act of 1984
- Long title: A joint resolution making continuing appropriations for the fiscal year 1985, and for other purposes.
- Nicknames: Acquisition of Foreign Evidence Improvements Act
- Enacted by: the 98th United States Congress
- Effective: October 12, 1984

Citations
- Public law: 98-473
- Statutes at Large: 98 Stat. 1837 aka 98 Stat. 2068

Codification
- Titles amended: 21 U.S.C.: Food and Drugs
- U.S.C. sections amended: 21 U.S.C. ch. 13, subch. I § 801 et seq.; 21 U.S.C. ch. 13, subch. II § 951 et seq.

Legislative history
- Introduced in the House as H.J.Res. 648 by Jamie Whitten (D-MS) on September 17, 1984; Committee consideration by House Appropriations; Passed the House on September 25, 1984 (316-91); Passed the Senate on October 4, 1984 (Passed voice vote); Reported by the joint conference committee on October 10, 1984; agreed to by the House on October 10, 1984 (252-60, agreed division vote) and by the Senate on October 11, 1984 (78-11)

The Controlled Substances Penalties Amendments Act of 1984, 98 Stat. 2068 (21 U.S.C. § 841(b)), generally enhanced the penalties for violations of the Comprehensive Drug Abuse Prevention and Control Act of 1970. The 1984 legislation removed an ambiguity in the then-existing law by providing that a State drug felony conviction would trigger the provisions enhancing penalties for recidivists; it went further by providing that a Foreign drug felony conviction would have the same effect. Finally, the 1984 legislation doubled the penalties for distribution of controlled substances where the offense is committed on or within 1,000 feet of school property.

== Disclosure of the Act ==
The Controlled Substances Penalties Amendments Act was authored as two chapters entitled Controlled Substances Penalties and Diversion Control Amendments. The H.R. 5656 bill was passed on September 18, 1984 as the Dangerous Drug Diversion Control Act of 1984. The 98th U.S. Congressional session confirmed the drug enforcement legislation with a 392-1 majority vote endorsing the Controlled Substances Penalties Amendments.

=== Part A — Controlled Substances Penalties ===
This chapter is cited as the Controlled Substances Penalties Amendments Act of 1984

(1) Controlled Substances Act is amended and redesignated —
(A) In the case of a violation of this section involving —

(i) 100 grams (3.5 oz) or more of a controlled substance in schedule I or schedule II which is a mixture or substance containing a detectable amount of a narcotic drug other than a narcotic drug consisting of —

(I) coca leaves
(II) a compound, manufacture, salt, derivative, or preparation of coca leaves
(III) a chemical substance or substance chemically identical thereto

(ii) 1 kilogram (2.2 lb) or more of any other controlled substance in schedule I or II which is a narcotic drug
(iii) 500 grams (18 oz) or more of phencyclidine (PCP)
(iv) 5 grams (0.18 oz) or more of lysergic acid diethylamide (LSD); such person shall be sentenced to a term of imprisonment of not more than 20 years, a fine of not more than $250,000, or both. If any person commits such a violation after one or more prior convictions of him for an offense punishable under this paragraph, or for a felony under any other provision of this title or title III or other law of a State, the United States, or a foreign country relating to narcotic drugs, marihuana, or depressant or stimulant substances, have become final, such person shall be sentenced to a term of imprisonment of not more than 40 years, a fine of not more than $500,000, or both.

(B) Controlled Substances Act is amended and redesignated —

(i) striking out "which is a narcotic drug" in the first sentence and inserting in lieu thereof "except as provided in subparagraphs (A) and (C)
(ii) striking out "$25,000" and "$50,000" and inserting in lieu thereof "$125,000" and "$250,000", respectively
(iii) striking out "of the United States" in the second sentence and inserting in lieu thereof "of a State, the United States, or a foreign country"

(C) Subparagraph (C), as redesignated above, by —

(i) striking out "a controlled substance in schedule I or II which is not a narcotic drug" and inserting in lieu thereof "less than 50 kilograms (110 lb) of marijuana, 10 kilograms (22 lb) of hashish, or 1 kilogram (2.2 lb) of hashish oil" and respectively
(ii) striking out "$15,000" and "$30,000" and inserting in lieu thereof "$50,000" and "$100,000", respectively
(iii) striking out "of the United States" in the second sentence and inserting in lieu thereof "of a State, the United States, or a foreign country"

(2) Paragraph (2) as redesignated by —

(A) striking out "$10,000" and "$20,000" and inserting in lieu thereof "$25,000" and "$50,000", respectively
(B) striking out "of the United States" and inserting in lieu thereof "of a State, the United States, or a foreign country"

(3) Paragraph (3) as redesignated by —

(A) striking out "$5,000" and "$10,000" and inserting in lieu thereof "$10,000" and "$20,000", respectively
(B) striking out "of the United States" and inserting in lieu thereof "of a State, the United States, or a foreign country"

(4) Paragraph (4), by striking out "(1)(B)" and inserting in lieu thereof "(1)(C)"
(5) By striking out paragraphs (5) and (6)
(6) By adding at the end thereof the following:

Any person who violates by cultivating a controlled substance on Federal property shall be fined not more than —

(A) $500,000 if such person is an individual
(B) $1,000,000 if such person is not an individual

==== Distribution In or Near Schools ====
(a) Any person who violates by distributing a controlled substance in or on, or within 1,000 feet (300 m) of, the real property comprising a public or private elementary school or secondary school is punishable.

(1) By a term of imprisonment, or fine, or both up to twice that authorized by this title
(2) At least twice any special parole term authorized by this title for a first offense involving the same controlled substance and schedule

(b) Any person who violates by distributing a controlled substance in or on, or within 1,000 feet (300 m) of, the real property comprising a public or private elementary or secondary school after a prior conviction or convictions have become final is punishable.

(1) by a term of imprisonment of not less than three years and not more than life imprisonment
(2) at least three times any special term authorized for a second or subsequent offense involving the same controlled substance and schedule

(c) In the case of any sentence imposed, imposition or execution of such sentence shall not be suspended and probation shall not be granted. An individual convicted shall not be eligible for parole under section 4202 of Title 18 of the United States Code until the individual has served the minimum sentence required.

Controlled Substances Import and Export Act is amended and redesignated —

(1) In the case of a violation of this section involving —

(A) 100 grams (3.5 oz) or more of a mixture or substance containing a detectable amount of a narcotic drug in schedule I or II other than a narcotic drug consisting of

(i) coca leaves
(ii) a compound, manufacture, salt, derivative, or preparation of coca leaves
(iii) a substance chemically identical thereto

(B) 1 kilogram (2.2 lb) or more of any other narcotic drug in schedule I or II
(C) 500 grams (18 oz) or more of phencyclidine (PCP)
(D) 5 grams (0.18 oz) or more of lysergic acid diethylamide (LSD); the person committing such violation shall be imprisoned for not more than twenty years, or fined not more than $250,000, or both

(2) Paragraph (2), as redesignated by —

(A) striking out "narcotic drug in schedule I or II, the person committing such violation shall" and inserting in lieu thereof "controlled substance in schedule I or II, the perfion committing such violation shall, except as provided in paragraphs (1) and (3)
(B) striking out "$25,000" and inserting in lieu thereof "$125,000"

(3) Paragraph (3), as redesignated by —

(A) striking out "a controlled substance other than a narcotic drug in schedule I or II, the person committing such violation shall" and inserting in lieu thereof "less than 50 kilograms (110 lb) of marihuana, less than 10 kilograms (22 lb) of hashish, less than 1 kilogram (2.2 lb) of hashish oil, or any quantity of a controlled substance in schedule III, schedule IV, or schedule V, the person committing such violation shall, except as provided in paragraph (4)
(B) striking out "$15,000" and substituting "$50,000"

Controlled Substances Import and Export Act is amended by striking out "the United States" and inserting in lieu thereof "a State, the United States, or a foreign country"

=== Part B — Diversion Control Amendments ===
(a) This part is cited as the Dangerous Drug Diversion Control Act of 1984
(b) Whenever an amendment or repeal is expressed in terms of an amendment to, or repeal of, a section or other provision, the reference shall be considered to be made to a section or other provision of the Controlled Substances Act, and whenever an amendment or repeal is expressed in terms of an amendment to, or repeal of, a section or other provision, the reference shall be considered to be made to a section or other provision of the Controlled Substances Import and Export Act.
(a) Section 102 (21 U.S.C. 802) is amended by redesignating paragraphs (14) through (29) as paragraphs (15) through (30), respectively, and by adding after paragraph (13) the following:

(14) The term 'isomer' means the optical isomer, except as used in schedule 1(c) and schedule II(a)(4). As used in schedule 1(c), the term 'isomer' means the optical, positional, or geometric isomer. As used in schedule II(a)(4), the term 'isomer' means the optical or geometric isomer."

(b) Paragraph (17) of section 102 is amended to read as follows:

(17) The term 'narcotic drug' means any of the following whether produced directly or indirectly by extraction from substances of vegetable origin, or independently by means of chemical synthesis, or by a combination of extraction and chemical synthesis

(A) Opium, opiates, derivatives of opium and opiates, including their isomers, esters, ethers, salts, and salts of isomers, esters, and ethers, whenever the existence of such isomers, esters, ethers, and salts is possible within the specific chemical designation. Such term does not include the isoquinoline alkaloids of opium.
(B) Poppy straw and concentrate of poppy straw
(C) Coca leaves, except coca leaves and extracts of coca leaves from which cocaine, ecgonine, and derivatives of ecgonine or their salts have been removed.
(D) Cocaine, its salts, optical and geometric isomers, and salts of isomers.
(E) Ecgonine, its derivatives, their salts, isomers, and salts of isomers.
(F) Any compound, mixture, or preparation which contains any quantity of any of the substances referred to in subparagraphs (A) through (E).

(c) Paragraph (a)(4) of schedule II is amended by inserting after "coca leaves" the first time it appears the following: "(including cocaine and ecgonine and their salts, isomers, derivatives, and salts of isomers and derivatives)"

Section 201(g) (21 U.S.C. 811(g)) is amended by adding at the end the following:

The Attorney General may, by regulation, exempt any compound, mixture, or preparation containing a controlled substance from the application of all or any part of this title if he finds such compound, mixture, or preparation meets the requirements of one of the following categories:

(A) A mixture, or preparation containing a nonnarcotic controlled substance, which mixture or preparation is approved for prescription use, and which contains one or more other active ingredients which are not listed in any schedule and which are included therein in such combinations, quantity, proportion, or concentration as to vitiate the potential for abuse.
(B) A compound, mixture, or preparation which contains any controlled substance, which is not for administration to a human being or animal, and which is packaged in such form or concentration, or with adulterants or denaturants, so that as packaged it does not present any significant potential for abuse.

Section 302(a) (21 U.S.C. 822(a)) is amended to read as follows:

(1) Every person who manufactures or distributes any controlled substance, or who proposes to engage in the manufacture or distribution of any controlled substance, shall obtain annually a registration issued by the Attorney General in accordance with the rules and regulations promulgated by him.
(2) Every person who dispenses, or who proposes to dispense, any controlled substance, shall obtain from the Attorney General a registration issued in accordance with the rules and regulations promulgated by him. The Attorney General shall, by regulation, determine the period of such registrations. In no event, however, shall such registrations be issued for less than one year nor for more than three years.

Section 303(f) (21 U.S.C. 823(f)) is amended to read as follows:

The Attorney General shall register practitioners (including pharmacies, as distinguished from pharmacists) to dispense, or conduct research with, controlled substances in schedule II, III, IV, or V, if the applicant is authorized to dispense, or conduct research with respect to, controlled substances under the laws of the State in which he practices. The Attorney General may deny an application for such registration if he determines that the issuance of such registration would be inconsistent with the public interest. In determining the public interest, the following factors shall be considered:

(1) The recommendation of the appropriate State licensing board or professional disciplinary authority.
(2) The applicant's experience in dispensing, or conducting research with respect to controlled substances.
(3) The applicant's conviction record under Federal or State laws relating to the manufacture, distribution, or dispensing of controlled substances.
(4) Compliance with applicable State, Federal, or local laws relating to controlled substances.
(5) Such other conduct which may threaten the public health and safety.

Separate registration under this part for practitioners engaging in research with controlled substances in schedule 11, III, IV, or V, who are already registered under this part in another capacity, shall not be required. Registration applications by practitioners wishing to Research and conduct research with controlled substances in schedule I shall be development, referred to the Secretary, who shall determine the qualifications and competency of each practitioner requesting registration, as well as the merits of the research protocol. The Secretary, in determining the merits of each research protocol, shall consult with the Attorney General as to effective procedures to adequately safeguard against diversion of such controlled substances from legitimate medical or scientific use. Registration for the purpose of bona fide research with controlled substances in schedule I by a practitioner deemed qualified by the Secretary may be denied by the Attorney General only on a ground specified in section 304(a). Article 7 of the Convention on Psychotropic Substances shall not be construed to prohibit, or impose additional restrictions upon, research involving drugs or other substances scheduled under the convention which is conducted in conformity with this subsection and other applicable provisions of this title.

Section 304 (21 U.S.C. 824) is amended by adding at the end the following:

The Attorney General may, in his discretion, seize or place under seal any controlled substances owned or possessed by a registrant whose registration has expired or who has ceased to practice or do business in the manner contemplated by his registration. Such controlled substances shall be held for the benefit of the registrant, or his successor in interest. The Attorney General shall notify a registrant, or his successor in interest, who has any controlled substance seized or placed under seal of the procedures to be followed to secure the return of the controlled substance and the conditions under which it will be returned. The Attorney General may not dispose of any controlled substance seized or placed under seal under this subsection until the expiration of one hundred and eighty days from the date such substance was seized or placed under seal.

Section 307(c)(1)(A) (21 U.S.C. 827(C)(1)(A)) is amended to read as follows:

To the prescribing of controlled substances in schedule II, III, IV, or V by practitioners acting in the lawful course of their professional practice unless such substance is prescribed in the course of maintenance or detoxification treatment of an individual.

Section 307(c)(1)(B) (21 U.S.C. 827(c)(1)(B)) is amended to read as follows:

To the administering of a controlled substance in schedule II, III, IV, or V unless the practitioner regularly engages in the dispensing or administering of controlled substances and charges his patients, either separately or together with charges for other professional services, for substances so dispensed or administered or unless such substance is administered in the course of maintenance treatment or detoxification treatment of an individual.

Section 307 (21 U.S.C. 827) is further amended by adding at the end a new subsection (g) as follows:

Every registrant under this title shall be required to report any change of professional or business address in such manner as the Attorney General shall by regulation require.

Section 403(a)(2) (21 U.S.C. 843(a)(2)) is amended to read as follows:

To use in the course of the manufacture, distribution, or dispensing of a controlled substance, or to use for the purpose of acquiring or obtaining a controlled substance, a registration number which is fictitious, revoked, suspended, expired, or issued to another person.

Section 1002(b)(2) (21 U.S.C 952(b)(2)) is amended to read as follows:

Is imported pursuant to such notification, or declaration, or in the case of any nonnarcotic controlled substance in schedule III, such import permit, notification, or declaration, as the Attorney General may by regulation prescribe, except that if a nonnarcotic controlled substance in schedule IV or V is also listed in schedule I or II of the Convention on Psychotropic Substances it shall be imported pursuant to such import permit requirements, prescribed by regulation of the Attorney General, as are required by the Convention.

Section 1003(e) (21 U.S.C. 953(e)) is amended to read as follows:

It shall be unlawful to export from the United States to any other country any nonnarcotic controlled substance in schedule III or IV or any controlled substances in schedule V unless —

(1) there is furnished (before export) to the Attorney General documentary proof that importation is not contrary to the laws or regulations of the country of destination for consumption for medical, scientific, or other legitimate purposes.
(2) it is exported pursuant to such notification or declaration, or in the case of any nonnarcotic controlled substance in schedule III, such export permit, notification, or declaration as the Attorney General may by regulation prescribe.
(3) in the case of a nonnarcotic controlled substance in schedule IV or V which is also listed in schedule I or II of the Convention on Psychotropic Substances, it is exported pursuant to such export permit requirements, prescribed by regulation of the Attorney General, as are required by the Convention.

Section 1008 (21 U.S.C. 958) is amended respectively, and —

(1) The Attorney General may deny an application for registration if he is unable to determine that such registration is consistent with the public interest and with the United States obligations under international treaties, conventions, or protocols in effect on the effective date of this part.
(2) The Attorney General may deny an application for registration or revoke or suspend a registration, if he determines that such registration is inconsistent with the public interest or with the United States obligations under international treaties, conventions, or protocols in effect on the effective date of this part.
(3) The Attorney General may limit the revocation or suspension of a registration to the particular controlled substance, or substances, with respect to which grounds for revocation or suspension exist.
(4) Before taking action pursuant to this subsection, the Attorney General shall serve upon the applicant or registrant an order to show cause as to why the registration should not be denied, revoked, or suspended. The order to show cause shall contain a statement of the basis thereof and shall call upon the applicant or registrant to appear before the Attorney General, or his designee, at a time and place stated in the order, but in no event less than thirty days after the date of receipt of the order. Proceedings to deny, revoke, or suspend shall be conducted pursuant to this subsection in accordance with subchapter II of chapter 5 of title 5 of the United States. Such proceedings shall be independent of, and not in lieu of, criminal prosecutions or other proceedings under this title or any other law of the United States.
(5) The Attorney General may, in his discretion, suspend any registration simultaneously with the institution of proceedings under this subsection, in cases where he finds that there is an imminent danger to the public health and safety. Such suspension shall continue in effect until the conclusion of such proceedings, including judicial review thereof, unless sooner withdrawn by the Attorney General or dissolved by a court of competent jurisdiction.
(6) In the event that the Attorney General suspends or revokes a registration granted under this section, all controlled substances owned or possessed by the registrant pursuant to such registration at the time of suspension or the effective date of the revocation order, as the case may be, may, in the discretion of the Attorney General, be seized or placed under seal. No disposition may be made of any controlled substances under seal until the time for taking an appeal has elapsed or until all appeals have been concluded, except that a court, upon application therefor, may at any time order the sale of perishable controlled substances. Any such order shall require the deposit of the proceeds of the sale with the court. Upon a revocation order becoming final, all such controlled substances (or proceeds of the sale thereof which have been deposited with the court) shall be forfeited to the United States; and the Attorney General shall dispose of such controlled substances in accordance with section 511(e) of the Controlled Substances Act.
