= Albert Krieger =

American criminal defense lawyer (1923–2020)

Albert Joseph Krieger
- Born: November 4, 1923; Manhattan, New York, U.S.
- Died: May 14, 2020 (aged 96); Miami, Florida, U.S.
- Education: New York University, New York University School of Law
- Occupation: criminal defense lawyer
- Spouse: Irene Stoller
- Children: 5

Albert Joseph "Al" Krieger (November 4, 1923 – May 14, 2020) was an American criminal defense lawyer, most prominently for figures in organized crime and drug trafficking, as well as for a number of Oglala Lakota activists during criminal proceedings following the Wounded Knee Occupation.

== Biography ==
Krieger was born on November 4, 1923, in Manhattan, to parents Lui and Ida (Arnow) Krieger. His father was a restaurateur. After graduating from Long Beach High School in Lido Beach, New York, Krieger won a football scholarship to New York University and graduated in 1945. He briefly served in the Army before continuing on to New York University School of Law, receiving an LL.B in 1949.

Krieger first rose to prominence in the late 1960s through his representation of crime boss Joseph Bonanno; together with his partner Susan Van Dusen, he helped to keep Bonanno free from imprisonment for more than a decade until he was convicted in an obstruction of justice case by Federal District Judge William A. Ingram after a non-jury trial in 1980. He is perhaps best known, however, for his role as defense counsel to mafioso John Gotti's at his 1992 trial in New York City; despite Krieger's aggressive questioning of organized crime associate Sammy Gravano, Gotti was ultimately convicted on the basis of overwhelming wiretap evidence.

Krieger often said that in his 60 years of practicing law he was proudest of having worked without a fee on behalf of the American Indian Movement members who occupied Wounded Knee, South Dakota, in 1973. He helped win acquittals or get charges dismissed against nearly all of the 150 defendants in that episode.

Krieger was known for representing various high profile clients. He provided posthumous commentary regarding the latter trial for the Netflix documentary, Cocaine Cowboys: The Kings of Miami (2021).

Outside of practice, he was a founder of the National Criminal Defense College in Macon, Georgia, which trains young criminal defense lawyers in advocacy skills, and a nationally recognized expert on cross-examination. Law school students, and practicing lawyers, regularly studied Mr. Krieger’s techniques for wearing down witnesses. He was the recipient of the National Association of Criminal Defense Lawyers's 1995 Robert C. Heeney Memorial Award, the Association's highest honor, as well as their Lifetime Achievement Award in 1987. He served as President of the organization from 1979-1980.

== Death ==
Krieger died in Miami, Florida on May 14, 2020, at age 96. He was survived by his wife Irene Stoller Krieger as well as by five children. One daughter, Luise Krieger-Martin, currently serves as a judge on the Miami-Dade County Court.
