= New York attack =

New York attack may refer to:

- List of terrorist incidents in New York City
- 2001 September 11 attacks
- 2017 New York City truck attack
- 2017 New York City Subway bombing
