= 2017 New York City terrorist attack =

2017 New York City terrorist attack may refer to:

- 2017 New York City truck attack, a vehicle-ramming attack on October 31
- 2017 New York City Subway bombing, an attempted suicide bombing at the Port Authority Bus Terminal on December 11
