= Metropolitan Correctional Center, New York =

Federal detention facility in Manhattan, New York

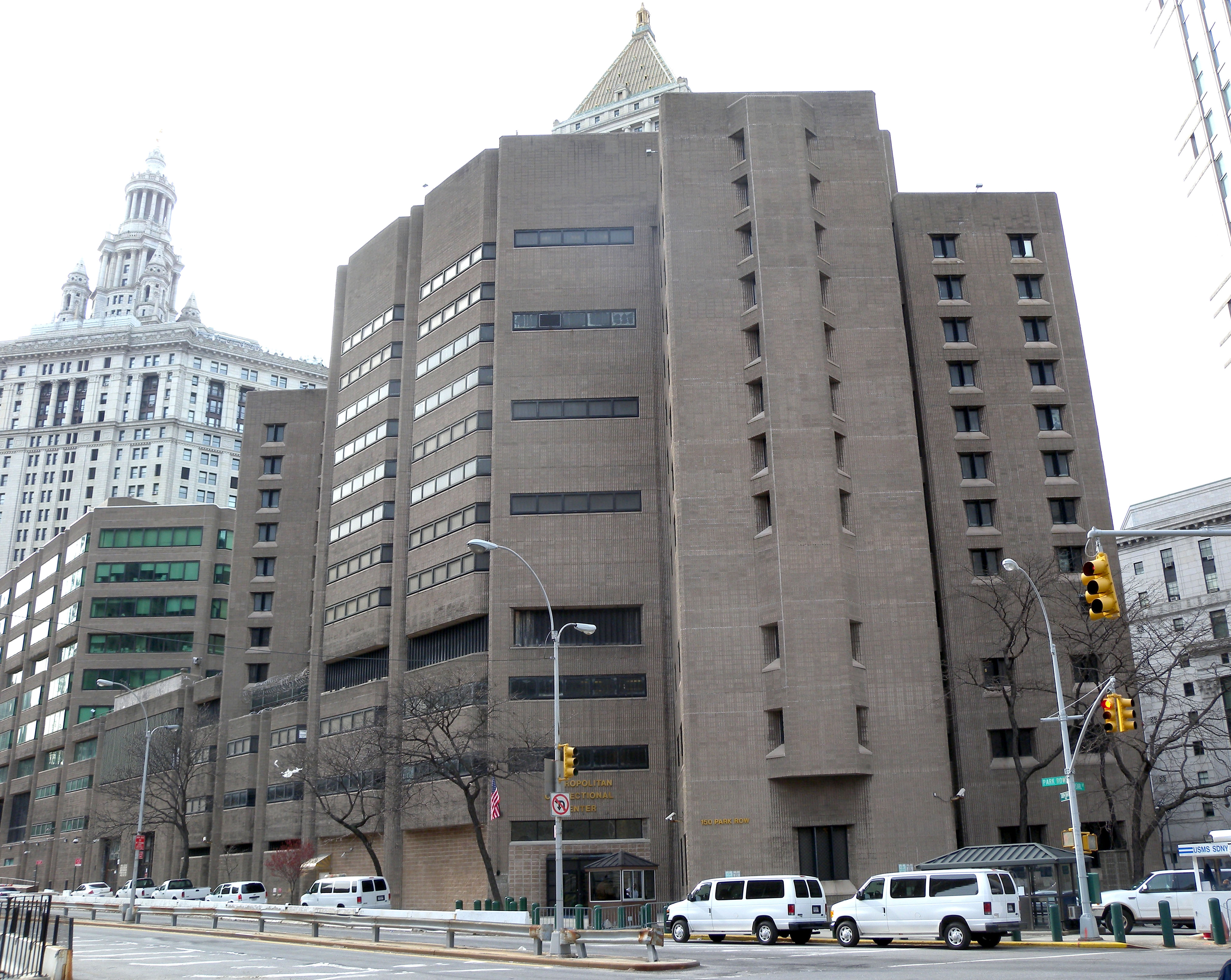
- Interactive map of Metropolitan Correctional Center, New York
- Location: Manhattan, New York City; 40°42′47″N 74°00′07″W
- Status: Inactive since 2021
- Security class: Administrative facility
- Population: 0
- Opened: 1975
- Managed by: Federal Bureau of Prisons
- Warden: Marti Licon-Vitale
- Website: Official website

The Metropolitan Correctional Center, New York (MCC New York) is a temporarily-closed United States federal administrative detention facility in the Civic Center of Lower Manhattan, New York City. It is located on Park Row behind the Thurgood Marshall United States Courthouse at Foley Square. It is operated by the Federal Bureau of Prisons, a division of the United States Department of Justice.

MCC New York holds male and female prisoners of all security levels. Most prisoners held at MCC New York have pending cases in the United States District Court for the Southern District of New York. MCC New York also holds prisoners serving brief sentences.

The Los Angeles Times stated that the prison is often referred to as the "Guantanamo of New York", and The New York Times stated that its administrative segregation units had severe security measures.

== History ==
Opened in 1975 in the Civic Center neighborhood of Lower Manhattan, MCC New York was the first high-rise facility to be used by the Bureau of Prisons. The jail was technically an extension of the Thurgood Marshall United States Courthouse, to which it was connected via a footbridge. Prisoners were assigned to one of 10 separate, self-contained housing units, resulting in little movement within the facility. In 2002, it was widely reported that MCC New York was severely overcrowded.

Numerous high-profile individuals have been held at MCC New York during court proceedings, including Gambino crime family bosses John Gotti and Jackie D'Amico, drug dealer Frank Lucas, Ponzi scheme fraudster Bernie Madoff, terrorists Omar Abdel Rahman and Ramzi Yousef, sex offender Jeffrey Epstein, and weapons trafficker Viktor Bout. After being extradited to the United States, Mexican drug lord Joaquín "El Chapo" Guzmán was housed in the facility.

On August 26, 2021, the Federal Bureau of Prisons announced that the prison would be temporarily closed because of its deteriorating condition. At the time of the announcement, 233 prisoners were held there. They were moved to other prisons while the department dealt with the problems.

== Facility ==
The correctional center is housed in a 12-story high-rise building located at 150 Park Row in the Civic Center neighborhood. In 2017, it had 796 inmates, both male and female, which is far more than its design capacity of 449. The facility has one female wing; seven General Population male wings, six of which feature cells and one is a dorm; one Special Housing Unit (SHU); and one maximum security unit. Each unit takes up two stories. All General Population units feature a gym (no weights), a kitchen (microwaves, hot water, ice), and five TV sets (one in the gym and four in the common area). Offices, classes, and computers are located on the unit's second floor. The jail is chronically understaffed.

Inmates in the 10-South wing are locked inside single-man cells 23 hours a day that are continuously monitored by CCTV cameras and have lights on at all times. Prisoners are kept isolated: their cells are equipped with showers, and the only time they're taken outside their cells is for exercise in an indoor cage. No outdoor recreation is permitted. Most 10-South prisoners are subject to special administrative measures, which severely restrict their communication with other prisoners and with the outside world.

The 9-South wing is a designated SHU. It houses inmates that violated prison rules; new arrivals that have not been medically cleared for General Population yet; and inmates in Protective Custody (PC). Both inmates in a cell are cuffed at the back through a food slot every time the cell door is to be opened. Inmates are escorted to the shower three times a week, always cuffed. The wing has leaky plumbing that results in prisoners encountering pools of standing water and sewage, and it also has rodent and cockroach infestations.

== Notable former inmates ==
Inmate Name	Register Number	Photo	Status	Details
Omar Abdel-Rahman	34892-054		Transferred to FMC Butner. Died of natural causes on February 18, 2017 while serving a life sentence plus 15 years.	Leader of the terrorist organization al-Gama'a al-Islamiyya; convicted in 1995 of seditious conspiracy for masterminding a foiled plot to bomb high-profile targets in New York City, including the United Nations, the Lincoln Tunnel, the Holland Tunnel, and the George Washington Bridge in what is known as the New York City landmark bomb plot, as well as conspiring to assassinate Egyptian President Hosni Mubarak.
Abu Hamza al-Masri	67495-054		Transferred to ADX Florence. Serving a life sentence under the name Mostafa Kamel Mostafa.	Egyptian cleric and former associate of deceased Al-Qaeda leader Osama bin Laden; extradited from the UK in 2012; convicted in 2014 of masterminding the 1998 kidnapping of Westerners in Yemen and conspiring to establish a terrorist training camp in Oregon in 1999.
Abu Anas al-Libi	Unknown		Died in custody at New York-Presbyterian Hospital on January 2, 2015 while awaiting trial.	High-ranking Al-Qaeda operatives; indicted in 2000 on conspiracy charges stemming from Al Qaeda's 1998 bombings of two US embassies in East Africa, which killed 224 people.
Khalid al-Fawwaz	67497-054		Transferred to USP Victorville. Serving a life sentence.	High-ranking Al-Qaeda operatives; indicted in 2000 on conspiracy charges stemming from Al Qaeda's 1998 bombings of two US embassies in East Africa, which killed 224 people.
Michael Avenatti	86743-054		Transferred to Long Beach Residential Reentry Management. Serving a 19-year sentence; scheduled for release on September 8, 2028.	Convicted in New York of attempting to extort Nike and honest services fraud related to his client; also facing two other pending trials relating to tax evasion, filing false tax returns and allegations of defrauding clients including Stormy Daniels.
Viktor Bout	91641-054		Transferred to USP Marion. Released into Russian custody in a prisoner exchange on December 12, 2022 after serving ten years of a 25-year sentence.	Russian arms dealer; convicted in 2011 of conspiring to kill Americans and supplying anti-aircraft missiles and other weapons to FARC, a Marxist group on the U.S. State Department list of Foreign Terrorist Organizations.
Daryl Campbell	75951-054		Transferred to Brooklyn MDC. Serving a 35-year sentence; scheduled for release on June 5, 2058.	Podcaster convicted of manslaughter after fatally shooting Troy Ave's bodyguard in 2016.
Jeffrey Epstein	76318-054		Died in custody of suicide by hanging in his cell on August 10, 2019 while awaiting trial.	Charged with the sex trafficking of underage girls. It was the first recorded suicide at MCC in 21 years.
Ahmed Khalfan Ghailani	02476-748		Transferred to ADX Florence, and then to USP McCreary. Serving a life sentence.	Al-Qaeda terrorist convicted for his role in the bombing of embassies in Kenya and Tanzania. He was on the FBI Most Wanted Terrorists list from its inception in October 2001. In 2004, he was captured and detained by Pakistani forces in a joint operation with the United States, and was held until June 9, 2009, at Guantanamo Bay detention camp.
John Gotti	18261-053		Transferred to MCFP Springfield. Died in 2002 while serving a life sentence.	Boss of the Gambino Crime Family in New York City from 1985 to 1992; convicted of murder, murder conspiracy, loansharking, illegal gambling, obstruction of justice, bribery, and tax evasion in 1992.
Salvatore Gravano	Unknown		Released in 1994 after serving less than one year of a five year sentence.	Former underboss of the Gambino Crime Family; turned government witness and testified against boss John Gotti. Placed in the Federal Witness Protection Program in return for turning government witness in 1991.
Joaquín Guzmán	89914-053		Transferred to ADX Florence. Serving a life sentence plus 30 years.	Sinaloa Cartel leader known as "El Chapo". Escaped twice from high-security prisons in Mexico before his capture in 2016; he was extradited to the United States in 2017 and convicted of drug trafficking and conspiracy to commit murder.
Patrick Ho	76101-054		Released from custody on June 8, 2020.	Hong Kong businessman charged with violating the Foreign Corrupt Practices Act and money laundering. In March 2019, he was sentenced to three years in prison for bribing the leaders of Chad and Uganda to secure advantages for CEFC China Energy.
Bernie Madoff	61727-054		Transferred to FCI Butner. Died in custody on April 14, 2021 after serving 11 years of a 150-year sentence.	Former financier; pleaded guilty in 2009 to fraud, money laundering, perjury and theft for perpetrating the largest Ponzi scheme in US history, robbing thousands of investors of over $65 billion over 20 years; the story was featured on the CNBC television program American Greed.
Paul Manafort	35207-016		Transferred to home confinement in May 2020. Released from custody on December 23, 2020 after being pardoned by President Donald Trump.	Former lobbyist, political consultant, lawyer, and chairman of the 2016 Donald Trump presidential campaign. Sentenced to 60 months in prison for lobbying violations, bank fraud, and tax fraud. Pardoned by Trump on December 23, 2020.
Ahmad Khan Rahimi	78312-054		Transferred to ADX Florence. Serving a life sentence.	Perpetrator of the 2016 New York and New Jersey bombings. Convicted in federal court of use of weapons of mass destruction and bombing a public place.
Sayfullo Habibullaevich Saipov	79715-054		Transferred to ADX Florence. Serving ten concurrent life sentences plus 260 years.	Perpetrator of the 2017 New York City truck attack, in which he killed eight people and injured thirteen others. Convicted in 2023 of murder, assault, and attempted murder in support of ISIS as well as providing material support to a foreign terrorist organization.
Ross Ulbricht	18870-111		Transferred to USP Florence High, then to USP Tucson. Released on January 21, 2025 after being pardoned by President Donald Trump.	Creator and operator of Silk Road, a darknet market website known for selling narcotics and other illicit goods. Originally sentenced to life in prison for drug trafficking, conspiracy to commit computer hacking, conspiracy to traffic in false identity documents, and conspiracy to launder money.
Akayed Ullah	79827-054		Transferred to ADX Florence. Serving a life sentence.	Convicted for the 2017 bombing of a New York City subway station, injuring four people (including Ullah), on behalf of ISIS.
Ramzi Yousef	03911-000		Transferred to ADX Florence. Serving a life sentence plus 240 years.	Convicted in 1994 of terrorism conspiracy and other charges in connection with the 1993 World Trade Center bombing, which killed six people and injured more than 1,000 others, and for the murder of the passenger killed when Yousef planted a bomb on Philippine Airlines Flight 434. Yousef was also convicted in 1996 of planning Project Bojinka, a foiled plot conceived by senior Al-Qaeda member Khalid Sheikh Mohammed to bomb twelve planes in a 48-hour period.
John Zancocchio	48744-080		Held in MCC New York awaiting trial; released on July 31, 2018.	Alleged Bonanno family consigliere charged with racketeering conspiracy involving loansharking, extortion, wire fraud, mail fraud, narcotics trafficking, and conspiracy to commit murder. Zancocchio was found not guilty on March 14, 2019.
Chuck Zito	12032-054		Transferred to FCI Lewisburg. Released from federal custody on April 13, 1990.	President of the New York Nomads chapter of the Hells Angels; pleaded guilty to conspiracy to distribute methamphetamine in 1986.

== See also ==
- Federal Bureau of Prisons
- Incarceration in the United States
- List of United States federal prisons
