= Lower Manhattan attack =

The Lower Manhattan attack may refer to several attacks that have occurred in Lower Manhattan, New York City, over the years:

- Wall Street bombing, 1920
- 1975 Fraunces Tavern bombing
- 1993 World Trade Center bombing
- September 11 attacks, 2001
- 2017 New York City truck attack
