= 1985 Rome and Vienna airport attacks =

1985 terror attacks by Palestinian nationalists

Rome and Vienna airport attacks
- Part of the Arab–Israeli conflict
- Aftermath in a fast food restaurant in the Leonardo da Vinci International Airport after the attack

- Locations of the incidents in Rome, Italy and Vienna, Austria
- Location: Fiumicino, Italy; Schwechat, Austria
- Date: 27 December 1985; 9:15 am (UTC+1)
- Target: Israeli targets in Leonardo da Vinci Airport (Rome) and Vienna International Airport (Vienna)
- Attack type: Shootings, bombings
- Weapons: Assault rifles Grenades
- Deaths: 19 (+4 terrorists)
- Injuries: 138 (+1 terrorist)
- Perpetrator: Abu Nidal Organization (purported)

The Rome and Vienna airport attacks were two major terrorist attacks carried out on 27 December 1985. Seven Arab terrorists attacked two airports in Rome, Italy, and Vienna, Austria, with assault rifles and hand grenades. Nineteen civilians were killed and over a hundred were injured before four of the terrorists were killed by El Al Security personnel and local police, who captured the remaining three.

== The attacks ==
=== Rome attack ===
At 08:15 GMT, four Palestinian gunmen walked to the shared ticket counter for Israel's El Al Airlines and Trans World Airlines at Leonardo da Vinci-Fiumicino Airport outside Rome, Italy, fired assault rifles and threw grenades. They killed 16 and wounded 99, including American diplomat Wes Wessels, before three of the attackers were killed by El Al security, while the remaining one, Mohammed Sharam, was wounded and captured by the Italian police. The dead included General Donato Miranda Acosta, Mexican military attache, and his secretary, Genoveva Jaime Cisneros.

==== Victims ====
- Donato Miranda Acosta, Mexican citizen, 53 years old.
- Dimitrios Antonopoulos, Greek citizen, 73 years old.
- John Buonocore, US citizen, 20 years old.
- Frederick Cage, US citizen, 31 years old.
- Genoveva Jaime Cisneros, Mexican citizen, 25 years old.
- Francesco Della Scala, Italian citizen, 57 years old.
- Mustaph Diedda, Algerian citizen, 21 years old.
- Parthenia Fotiadi, Greek citizen 24 years old.
- Don Malend, American citizen, 31 years old.
- Meletios Adam, Greek citizen, 58 years old.
- Natasha Sophie Simpson, American citizen, 12 years old.
- Unidentified Israeli security agent.
- Mexican Military Attaché in Roma.

=== Vienna attack ===
Minutes later, at Schwechat Airport (Vienna International Airport) in Vienna, Austria, three terrorists carried out a similar attack. Hand grenades were thrown into crowds of passengers queuing to check in for a flight to Tel Aviv, killing two people instantly and wounding 39 others. A third victim died on 22 January 1986, of hand grenade wounds sustained in the attack. First response came from several Austrian police officers, who opened fire on the terrorists. They were supported by two plainclothes El Al security guards who helped to repel the attackers. Over 200 bullets were fired during the fight. The terrorists seized a Mercedes outside the terminal and fled, with Austrian police and El Al security guards giving chase. They killed one terrorist and captured the other two several miles from the airport after a short car chase and gun battle.

=== Aftermath ===
In all, the two strikes killed 19, including a child, and wounded around 140. Some contemporary reports claimed the gunmen originally intended to hijack El Al jets at the airports and blow them up over Tel Aviv; others concluded that the attack on waiting passengers was the original plan and that the Frankfurt airport was meant to be hit as well.

The attacks came after increased security due to recent hijackings and official Interpol warnings that airports might be targeted by terrorists during the holiday season.

== Perpetrators ==
Italian authorities stated that receipts uncovered on the terrorists indicated that they had entered Italy a few weeks earlier and had stayed in hotels near Rome. They all had Moroccan passports. It was also reported that a note in Arabic was found on the body of one of the attackers, addressed to ''Zionists'' and announcing, ''the war has begun.'' The note was reportedly signed, ''the martyrs of Palestine.''

Israeli authorities first blamed the attacks on the Palestine Liberation Organization (PLO), but its leader, Yasser Arafat, denied the accusations and denounced the strikes. The PLO expressed "indignation at the criminal act" and asserted that the attacks were coordinated as part of a "plot against the Palestinian cause", intending to force Austria and Italy into severing ties with the Palestinians. PLO officials recalled that Arafat had recently pledged that coordinated armed Palestinian resistance would be confined to Israel and the occupied territories.

Responsibility for the two attacks was later claimed by the Abu Nidal Organization (ANO) in retaliation for Operation Wooden Leg, the Israeli bombing of PLO headquarters in Tunis on 1 October 1985. Libya was accused by the US of funding the terrorists who carried out the attacks; although they denied the charges, they did praise the assaults. According to published reports, sources close to Abu Nidal said Libyan intelligence supplied the weapons and the ANO's head of the Intelligence Directorate's Committee for Special Missions, Dr. Ghassan al-Ali, organized the attacks. Libya denied these charges as well, notwithstanding that it claimed they were "heroic operations carried out by the sons of the martyrs of Sabra and Shatila." Italian secret services blamed Syria and Iran.

The surviving terrorist in the Rome airport attack, a Syrian-born Palestinian, Mahmoud Ibrahim Khaled (Khalid Ibrahim), aged 18 at the time of the attack, was sentenced to 30 years imprisonment in 1988. He was released early on good behavior in June 2010, was provided with an Italian residence permit, and was living and working in Rome as of early 2011. He was employed, and had a girlfriend. In an interview with Il Messaggero, he condemned terrorism, expressed remorse for the attacks, and said that he prays for God's forgiveness. In 1987, an Austrian court sentenced the two surviving terrorists in the Vienna airport attack to life imprisonment.

== See also ==
- Pan Am Flight 110
- 2002 Los Angeles International Airport shooting
- Terrorism in the European Union
