= Diversity Immigrant Visa =

Immigration lottery for entry into the US

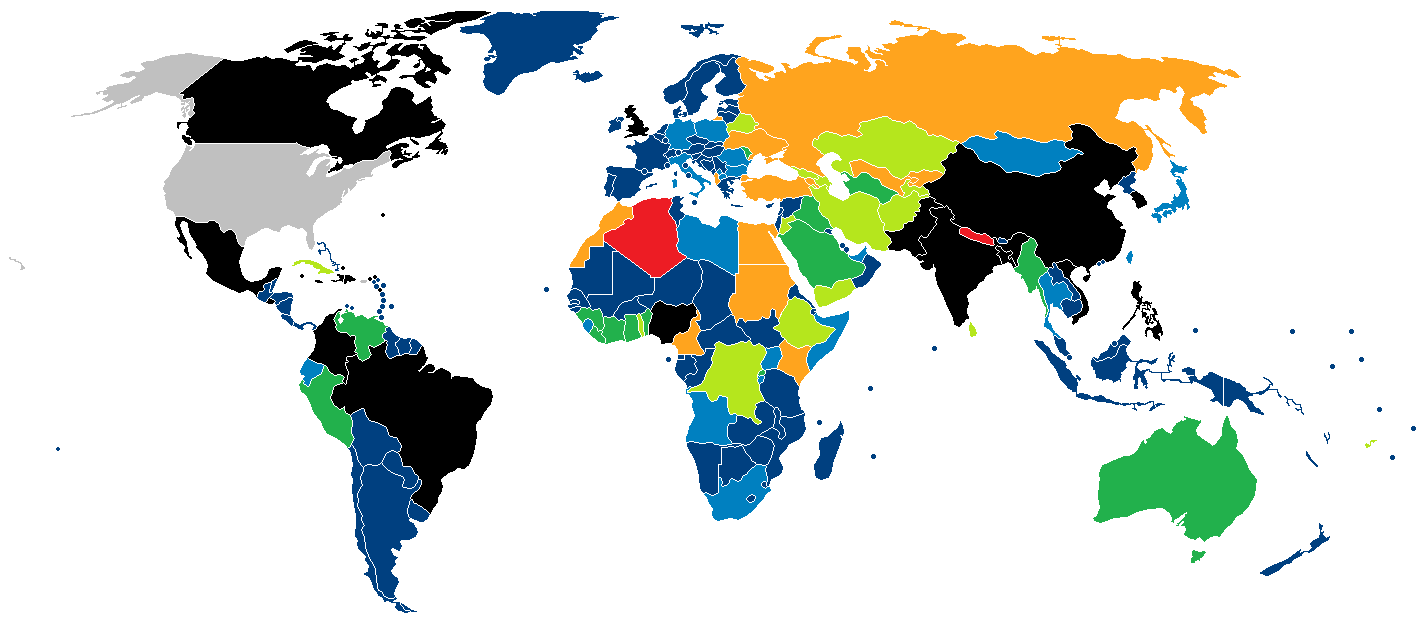
New immigrants to the United States (2020–2024), in diversity category, by country of birth: >10,000 5,000–10,000 2,000–5,000 1,000–2,000 / 500–1,000 <500 Ineligible United States and its territories

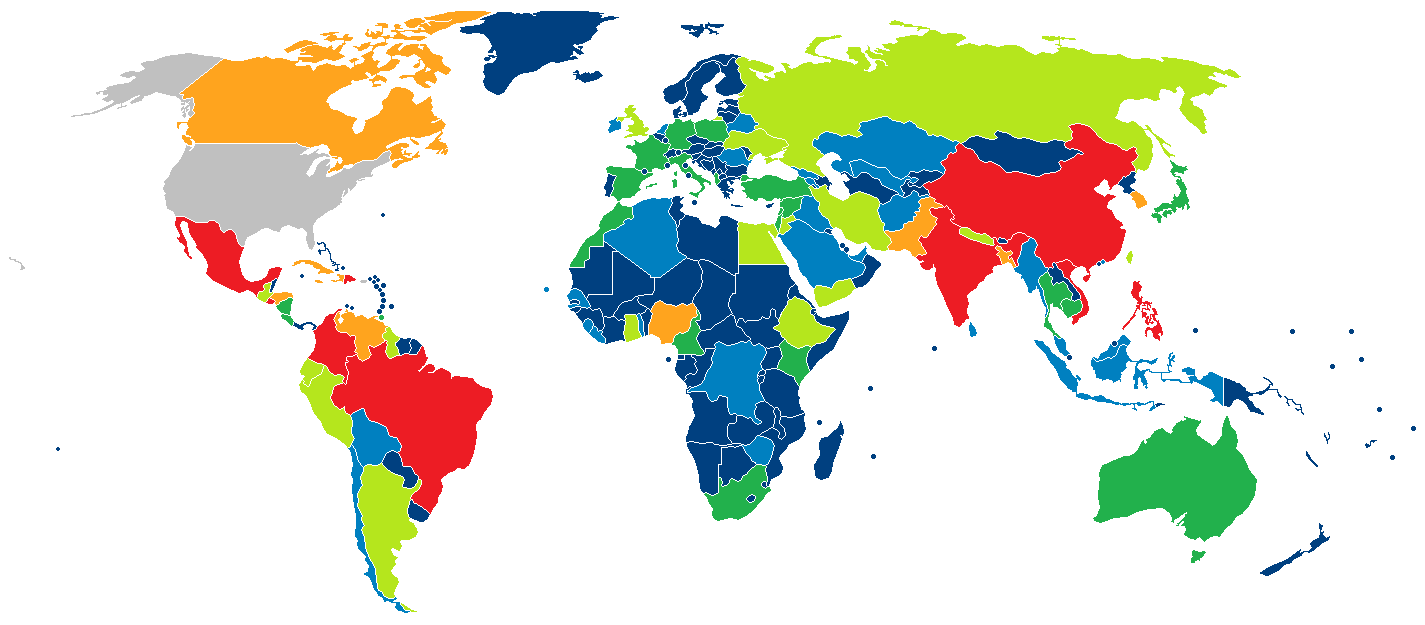
New immigrants to the United States (2020–2024), in family and employment categories, by country of birth: >100,000 50,000–100,000 20,000–50,000 10,000–20,000 / 5,000–10,000 <5,000 United States and its territories

The Diversity Immigrant Visa program, also known as the green card lottery, is a United States government lottery program for receiving an immigrant visa followed by a permanent resident card. The Immigration Act of 1990 established the current and permanent Diversity Visa (DV) program.

The lottery is administered by the Department of State and conducted under the Immigration and Nationality Act (INA). It provides up to 55,000 immigrant visas annually and aims to diversify the immigrant population in the United States, by selecting applicants from countries with low numbers of immigrants in the previous five years. More than 22 million people apply for the lottery each year, which means that fewer than 1 in 400 applicants receive visas.

Applicants enter the lottery by completing a form on the Department of State website.

Attempts have been made to end the program since 2005.

== History ==
=== Legislative and administrative history ===
Starting in 1986, the United States established several temporary immigrant visa programs outside of the usual immigration preferences (family members or by employment). The first program was NP-5, run from 1987 to 1989, where a limited number of visas was issued on a first-come, first-served basis. The second program was OP-1, run through a lottery from 1989 to 1991 and available for natives of countries with low levels of recent immigration to the United States. The third program, AA-1, from 1992 to 1994, was available for natives from a select group of countries that had been "adversely affected" by earlier immigration laws. Intentionally and in practice, people from Ireland and Northern Ireland benefited disproportionately from these programs. They were also known as the Donnelly, Berman and Morrison visas, respectively, after the sponsoring congressmen. The Government of Ireland has actively supported the various lottery bills and similar legislation since their inception.

The Donnelly visa benefited "several thousand Irish" (almost 4,000) and the Berman visa had some 500 Irish beneficiaries. Under the three-year Morrison program (1992–94), by far the largest in size, those born in Ireland or Northern Ireland received a set-aside of 40% of all diversity visas, for a total of 48,000 set aside visas out of 120,000. Natives or citizens of Poland, via the sheer volume of applicants, received the second largest number of visas. The United Kingdom came in a distant third with some 6,000 visas in the Morrison program.

The Immigration Act of 1990 was passed with bipartisan support and signed by President George H. W. Bush. The legislation established the current and permanent Diversity Visa (DV) program, where 55,000 immigrant visas are available in an annual lottery. The lottery aims to diversify the immigrant population in the United States, by selecting applicants mostly from countries with low numbers of immigrants to the United States in the previous five years.

From fiscal year 1999, the number of visas in the DV program was reduced by up to 5,000, to partially compensate the number of immigrants under the NACARA program, and from fiscal year 2025, also to compensate the number of immigrants under the National Defense Authorization Act for Fiscal Year 2024. As a result, the number of visas in the DV program was reduced to 50,000 from fiscal years 1999 to 2019, about 54,800 from 2020 to 2024, and about 51,600 in 2025 and 2026.

The first DV lottery, for fiscal year 1995, was named DV-1. For fiscal years 1996 to 1999, the name was in the format DV-YY, where YY was the last two digits of the year. Since fiscal year 2000 the lotteries have been named in the format DV-YYYY, with the full year number. The year in the name refers to the fiscal year when the immigrant visas will be given, which starts in October of the previous calendar year, and the entry period for the lottery occurs almost a year earlier. Therefore, there is a two-year difference between the lottery name and its entry period. For example, for DV-2017 (fiscal year starting in October 2016), the entry period was in 2015.

Initially, the DV lottery was administered entirely by mail, and only winners were notified. The entry form moved to an online system starting in DV-2005, but still only winners were notified, by mail. Starting in DV-2010, all applicants are able to verify online whether they were selected. Notification of winners also by mail continued until DV-2011, but since DV-2012 it is done exclusively online.

In DV-2012, a computer error caused a non-random selection of lottery applicants, leading the Department of State to cancel the initial result. About 22,000 applicants had already been notified and were disappointed to find that their selection was canceled. The Department of State later ran a new selection after correcting the error.

Starting in 2019, for DV-2021, applicants had to hold a valid passport and provide its number on the lottery entry form. This requirement reduced the number of applicants by more than half compared to previous years. In 2022, the requirement was removed after a federal court found that the Department of State had not followed the proper procedure, with a public notice and comments, before implementing it. In 2025, the Department of State issued a public notice accepting comments to restore the passport requirement.

In DV-2025 and DV-2026, the lottery was initially run without updating the list of eligible countries, so it incorrectly excluded the United Kingdom (except Northern Ireland) from both years and incorrectly included Cuba in DV-2026. After an applicant filed a lawsuit complaining about the error, the Department of State selected applicants from the United Kingdom for both years, and notified selected applicants from Cuba in DV-2026 that they were ineligible.

Initially there was no fee to enter the lottery, and only applicants selected in the lottery were charged to continue the process. In 2025, the Department of State added a fee of US$1 to enter the lottery, while maintaining the fee for selected applicants unchanged.

=== Criticism and repeal efforts ===
Criticism of the program has focused on instances of fraud, racism and the random nature of the lottery, as well as criminal or terrorist actions perpetrated by certain lottery winners.

In 2002, Hesham Mohamed Hadayet, an Egyptian immigrant who maintained residency in United States through his wife's diversity visa, killed two people and injured four others at Los Angeles International Airport before being shot to death by an El Al security guard. This led to criticism of the lottery as a security threat.

Several attempts have been made to eliminate the lottery. In December 2005, the United States House of Representatives voted 273–148 to add an amendment to the border enforcement bill H.R. 4437 abolishing the DV. Opponents of the lottery said it was susceptible to fraud and was a way for terrorists to enter the country. The Senate never passed the bill. In March 2007, Congressman Bob Goodlatte (R-VA) introduced H.R. 1430, which would eliminate the Diversity Visa program. In June 2007, the U.S. House passed H.R. 2764 to eliminate funding for the program, and the Senate did likewise in September.

However, the final version of this bill with amendments, signed into law on December 26, 2007, did not include the removal of funds for the program. Although H.R. 2764 was an appropriation bill and could only cut funds for the lottery during one fiscal year, this was the first time that both the House and the Senate passed a bill to halt the Diversity Visa program.

Rep. Goodlatte reintroduced his Security and Fairness Enhancement for America Act (formerly H.R. 1430, now H.R. 2305) on May 7, 2009. The bill would have amended the Immigration and Nationality Act to eliminate the diversity immigrant program completely, but did not pass. Rep. Sheila Jackson-Lee (D-TX) introduced the Save America Comprehensive Immigration Act of 2009 (H.R. 264) on January 7, 2009. The bill would have doubled the number of diversity visas available to 110,000 yearly. This bill did not pass. A comprehensive analysis of DV lottery issues was prepared in 2011 by Congressional Research Service.

In 2013, the so-called "Gang of Eight" - a bi-partisan group of eight United States Senators - introduced a bill that would have comprehensively reformed the immigration system. The bill would have repealed the Diversity Immigrant Visa program. The legislation passed the Senate, but was defeated in the Republican-controlled House of Representatives amid Republican opposition.

In 2017, Sayfullo Habibullaevich Saipov, who had immigrated from Uzbekistan on a diversity visa in 2010, killed eight and injured eleven when he drove his truck down a bike path in Lower Manhattan. In response, President Donald Trump, who had earlier called for a return to a "merit-based" immigration system, called for an end to the program. Following Trump's call to end the program, White House Press Secretary Sarah Huckabee Sanders, indicated that diversity visa lottery recipients lack thorough vetting, something PolitiFact rated as false, noting that all recipients of the visa undergo background checks, security screenings, and interviews by consular officers before arrival in the United States.

In December 2025, by order from President Trump, Secretary of State Marco Rubio and Secretary of Homeland Security Kristi Noem suspended the issuance of diversity visas and green cards, in response to a shooting at Brown University, whose suspect had previously immigrated under the program. In August 2026, a federal court canceled the suspension.

== Process ==
=== Requirements ===
To enter the lottery, applicants must be chargeable to an eligible country. The country of chargeability is the applicant's country of birth, with two exceptions: the applicant may claim the spouse's country of birth instead if desired, or a parent's country of birth if neither parent was born in the applicant's country of birth and neither parent legally resided there when the applicant was born. The applicant's country of residence or nationality is irrelevant to the lottery. In addition, applicants must have completed at least a high school education or at least two years of work experience in an occupation which requires at least two other years of training or experience.

Applicants enter the lottery by completing a form on the Department of State website. The form asks for the applicant's name, gender, date and place of birth, country of chargeability, digital photograph, mailing address, country of residence, telephone number, email address, education level, and marital status; as well as the name, gender, date and place of birth, and digital photograph of the applicant's spouse and unmarried children under age 21 who are not U.S. citizens or U.S. permanent residents. In 2025, the Department of State added a fee of US$1 to enter the lottery.

Applicants selected in the lottery must also pay a fee to continue the process. To qualify for the immigrant visa, they must also satisfy general requirements applicable to all immigrants, mainly related to health, criminal background and means of support.

=== Ineligible countries ===
Those chargeable to a country that was the origin of more than 50,000 immigrants to the United States via family and employment categories in the previous five years are not eligible to receive a diversity visa. For DV-2026 (the most recent lottery, with entry period in 2024), those chargeable to the following countries were ineligible: Bangladesh, Brazil, Canada, China (mainland and Hong Kong), Colombia, Cuba, Dominican Republic, El Salvador, Haiti, Honduras, India, Jamaica, Mexico, Nigeria, Pakistan, Philippines, South Korea, Venezuela, and Vietnam.

The limit of 50,000 immigrants refers only to people who immigrated via family and employment categories, and does not include other categories such as refugees, asylum seekers, or previous diversity immigrants. For this reason, Afghanistan, Ecuador, Guatemala and Nepal were not on the ineligible list as of 2025, despite being the origin of over 50,000 total immigrants in the previous five years.

==== Changes ====
The first program was in fiscal year 1995, and the following 12 countries were ineligible from the start: Canada, China (mainland), Dominican Republic, El Salvador, India, Jamaica, Mexico, Philippines, South Korea, Taiwan, United Kingdom and its dependent territories (except Northern Ireland and Hong Kong), and Vietnam. Since then, Bangladesh, Brazil, Colombia, Cuba, Haiti, Honduras, Nigeria, Pakistan and Venezuela have been added to the ineligible list, Taiwan and the United Kingdom have been removed from it, and Ecuador, Guatemala, Peru, Poland and Russia have been added and later removed from the ineligible list, reflecting shifting levels of immigration from these countries.

Macau was ineligible as part of China only for DV-2002, whose entry period (October 2000) was after the transfer of sovereignty of Macau from Portugal to China (December 1999) but before enactment of the Macau Policy Act (December 2000), which specified that U.S. law would treat Macau as it did before the transfer. Hong Kong was considered as a separate country for the lottery and eligible from the start, but became ineligible as part of China from DV-2022.

Historical eligibility for the Diversity Immigrant Visa lottery, by fiscal year
Country	1990s					2000s										2010s										2020s						
Country	5	6	7	8	9	0	1	2	3	4	5	6	7	8	9	0	1	2	3	4	5	6	7	8	9	0	1	2	3	4	5	6
Bangladesh	Yes																		No													
Brazil	Yes													No																		
Canada	No																															
China (Note: Including Macau only for DV-2002, and Hong Kong only from DV-2022.)	No																															
Colombia	Yes	No																														
Cuba	Yes																															No
Dominican Republic	No																															
Ecuador	Yes														No									Yes								
El Salvador	No																															
Guatemala	Yes														No					Yes							No		Yes			
Haiti	Yes					No																										
Honduras	Yes																											No				
India	No																															
Jamaica	No																															
Mexico	No																															
Nigeria	Yes																				No											
Pakistan	Yes							No																								
Peru	Yes													No													Yes					
Philippines	No																															
Poland	Yes			No				Yes					No						Yes													
Russia	Yes										No					Yes																
South Korea	No																															
Taiwan	No							Yes																								
United Kingdom (Note: Excluding Northern Ireland. Including dependent territories except Hong Kong.)	No																														Yes	
Venezuela	Yes																												No			
Vietnam	No																															
Others	Yes																															

=== Geographical distribution ===
Regions and eligible countries for the Diversity Visa lottery: Eligible / Ineligible / Eligible / Ineligible; / North America / / Asia; / South America / / Oceania; / Europe / / United States and its territories; / Africa

The visas are distributed among six regions: Africa, Asia, Europe, North America, Oceania, and South America. Cyprus, Turkey, and all post-Soviet states are included in the region of Europe, even though some of them are geographically in Asia. The region of North America consists only of Canada and the Bahamas. Mexico, Central America and other Caribbean countries are included in the region of South America.

Dependent territories are treated as part of their respective sovereign countries, and disputed territories are allocated as recognized by the United States. For example, Bermuda is treated as part of the United Kingdom under Europe, the Gaza Strip is considered part of Egypt under Africa, and the West Bank is considered part of Jordan under Asia. However, there are some exceptions: Northern Ireland and Taiwan are treated as separate countries, and Macau is considered part of Portugal under Europe (even after its sovereignty returned to China in 1999).

Each region that was the origin of more than one sixth of the total number of immigrants to the United States via family and employment categories in the previous five years is considered a "high-admission region" (currently South America and Asia), and each region that was the origin of less than one sixth is a "low-admission region" (currently North America, Europe, Africa and Oceania). The proportion of diversity visas given to the group of low-admission regions is set as the proportion of recent immigrants from the group of high-admission regions (currently about 80%), and vice versa. Among regions of the same group, the diversity visas are allocated proportionally to their population, excluding ineligible countries (those that were the origin of more than 50,000 immigrants in the previous five years).

Within each region, the visas are not allocated among individual countries. All applicants from the same region are selected randomly as a whole, for the number of visas allocated for that region, but with the limitation that no single country may receive more than 7% of the total diversity visas (3,850).

Although only up to 55,000 diversity visas are available each year, the lottery selects more than 100,000 applicants. The reason for the larger selection is to ensure that all available diversity visas are eventually given each year, as some applicants are expected to fail general immigration requirements or may decide to withdraw and not to continue the process. As a result, some lottery winners who have received notifications might not obtain visas.

It is also possible that some visas remain available after all initially selected applicants are reviewed. In this case, additional applicants are selected later. For this reason, applicants who were not initially selected in the lottery should keep checking their status online periodically, until the end of the respective fiscal year.

== Statistics ==
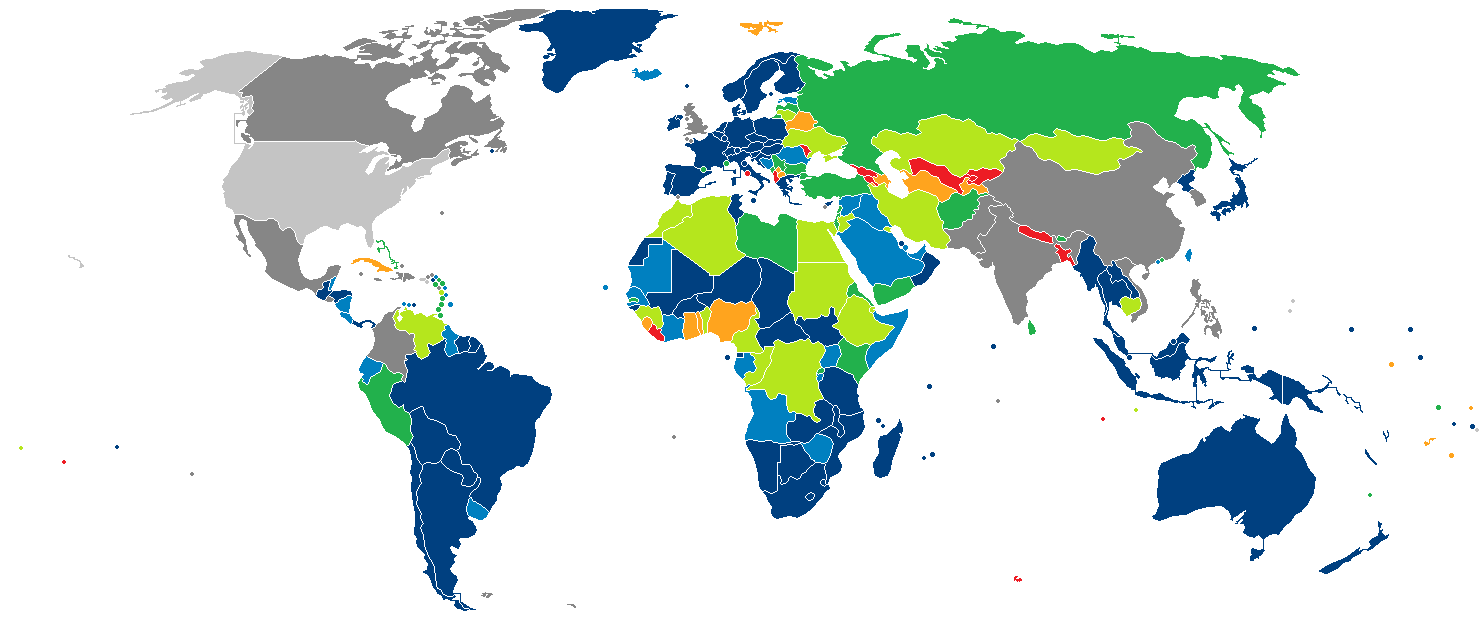
Applicants (including dependents) to the Diversity Visa lottery (for most recent eligible year with available data), as a percentage of each country's population: >2.0% 1.0–2.0% 0.5–1.0% 0.2–0.5% / 0.1–0.2% <0.1% United States and its territories Not eligible for any year with available data

Applicants (not including dependents)
DV year	Qualified entries							Disqualified entries
DV year	Africa	Asia	Europe	North America	Oceania	South America	Total	Disqualified entries
2026							20,822,624	
2025							19,927,656	
2024							22,185,619	
2023							9,570,291	
2022							7,336,302	
2021	3,100,982	1,281,046	2,014,089	937	16,672	327,402	6,741,128	
2020	8,145,390	1,952,489	4,072,324	1,445	22,722	528,428	14,722,798	
2019	7,832,894	1,871,824	4,349,555	1,506	23,201	273,033	14,352,013	
2018	7,746,722	2,505,838	4,029,967	1,898	29,845	377,988	14,692,258	
2017	6,672,971	2,200,641	3,284,670	1,951	30,133	246,824	12,437,190	
2016	5,936,031	2,014,130	3,069,646	2,170	28,641	340,528	11,391,146	
2015	4,818,431	1,564,534	2,835,004	1,830	24,110	145,189	9,389,098	
2014	5,272,185	1,339,518	2,614,381	1,832	26,380	119,996	9,374,292	
2013	4,657,512	1,055,433	2,103,591	1,752	22,410	100,634	7,941,332	
2012	4,405,638	8,515,565	1,728,796	2,134	23,571	92,955	14,768,659	
2011	4,209,668	6,166,632	1,510,874	2,204	22,182	90,018	12,001,578	
2010	3,539,362	4,663,357	1,250,553	1,596	19,613	59,530	9,534,011	
2009	2,780,946	4,996,568	1,255,078	1,778	22,425	90,545	9,147,340	
2008	2,590,647	2,473,602	1,251,859	1,489	22,133	115,437	6,455,167	
2007	2,472,729	1,725,702	1,099,703	1,184	19,491	246,753	5,565,562	
2006							6.3 million	
2005							5.9 million	
2004							7.3 million	2.9 million
2003							6.2 million	2.5 million
2002							10 million	3 million
2001							11 million	2 million
2000							8 million	2.5 million
1999							3.4 million	2.4 million
1998							4.7 million	1.3 million
1997							6.5 million	1.1 million
1996							4.5 million	2.2 million
1995							6.5 million	1.5 million

Applicants (including dependents)
DV year	Africa	Asia	Europe	North America	Oceania	South America	Total
2022							13,191,296
2021	4,877,931	2,353,280	3,915,557	1,672	28,072	654,195	11,830,707
2020	11,315,826	3,548,165	7,185,456	2,748	39,608	1,090,751	23,182,554
2019	10,877,791	3,289,665	7,620,677	2,864	39,102	594,954	22,425,053
2018	10,714,881	4,445,328	7,068,792	3,541	48,988	807,083	23,088,613
2017	9,063,669	3,867,613	5,820,808	3,581	49,517	539,398	19,344,586
2016	8,161,205	3,516,123	5,111,888	4,263	48,155	731,730	17,573,364
2015	6,586,302	2,720,578	4,731,871	3,585	39,884	315,667	14,397,887
2014	7,500,543	2,384,168	4,434,210	3,657	45,120	266,272	14,633,970
2013	6,783,699	1,863,169	3,672,464	3,356	37,224	217,443	12,577,355
2012	6,304,219	10,102,185	3,022,473	3,717	38,962	200,712	19,672,268
2011	5,812,174	7,870,896	2,593,039	3,793	37,674	193,932	16,511,508
2010	5,105,302	6,175,452	2,154,539	2,624	33,743	126,168	13,597,828
2009	4,372,560	6,401,172	2,174,677	3,193	40,964	192,447	13,185,013
2008	4,150,759	3,506,073	2,120,883	2,647	40,260	243,694	10,064,316
2007	3,901,093	2,732,805	1,910,383	1,968	34,834	489,144	9,070,227

Selected applicants (including dependents)
DV year	Africa	Asia	Europe	North America	Oceania	South America	Total
2026	53,939	23,381	44,733	23	3,178	4,262	129,516
2025	55,942	23,198	43,197 (Note: Additional applicants from the United Kingdom (except Northern Ireland) were selected later.)	19	4,053	4,651	131,060
2024	55,030	27,960	50,161	15	4,450	5,331	142,947
2023	49,119	24,044	40,065	16	2,503	3,515	119,262
2022	49,003	24,001	39,999	16	2,501	3,501	119,021
2021	53,649	25,408	45,002	29	2,815	5,501	132,404
2020	31,562	15,941	30,794	20	1,378	4,189	83,884
2019	38,247	15,619	30,006	18	1,538	2,182	87,610
2018	49,392	15,997	41,706	15	3,863	4,995	115,968
2017	38,500	13,499	28,500	10	1,450	1,951	83,910 (Note: Additional 7,700 applicants were selected later.)
2016	45,034	15,002	27,011	16	1,500	3,000	91,563
2015	58,000	20,002	40,000	14	3,499	3,999	125,514
2014	61,943	23,270	46,588	23	4,215	4,620	140,659
2013	52,080	16,045	33,088	16	2,193	2,206	105,628
2012	50,000	15,002	31,001	15	2,001	2,002	100,021
2011	51,004	14,999	30,999	18	1,600	2,001	100,621
2010	54,003	15,001	29,803	18	1,803	1,982	102,610
2009	53,979	14,002	27,921	12	1,801	1,893	99,608
2008	52,824	14,142	26,149	17	1,713	1,845	96,690
2007	43,999	11,929	21,938	12	1,398	3,097	82,373
2006	44,415	11,473	24,980	12	2,115	4,438	87,433
2005	45,143	13,804	34,610	14	1,720	4,991	100,282
2004	50,547	19,628	35,868	12	1,312	3,790	111,157
2003	39,138	14,169	29,226	13	1,200	3,407	87,153
2002	40,141	15,337	30,003	15	1,223	3,272	89,991
2001	39,028	14,773	31,496	19	1,300	3,813	90,429
2000	42,422	15,990	46,051	36	2,302	6,621	113,422
1999	34,371	11,819	37,993	14	1,444	4,105	89,746
1998	38,477	13,126	39,272	15	1,533	4,496	96,919
1997	37,920	10,038	42,747	17	1,490	4,471	96,683
1996	36,458	12,777	44,440	37	1,586	4,411	99,709
1995	64,189	25,354	92,716	23	2,787	9,475	194,544

Portion of applicants who were selected
DV year	Africa	Asia	Europe	North America	Oceania	South America	Total
2022							0.90%
2021	1.10%	1.08%	1.15%	1.73%	10.03%	0.84%	1.12%
2020	0.28%	0.45%	0.43%	0.73%	3.48%	0.38%	0.36%
2019	0.35%	0.47%	0.39%	0.63%	3.93%	0.37%	0.39%
2018	0.46%	0.36%	0.59%	0.42%	7.89%	0.62%	0.50%
2017	0.42%	0.35%	0.49%	0.28%	2.93%	0.36%	0.43%
2016	0.55%	0.43%	0.53%	0.38%	3.11%	0.41%	0.52%
2015	0.88%	0.74%	0.85%	0.39%	8.77%	1.27%	0.87%
2014	0.83%	0.98%	1.05%	0.63%	9.34%	1.74%	0.96%
2013	0.77%	0.86%	0.90%	0.48%	5.89%	1.01%	0.84%
2012	0.79%	0.15%	1.03%	0.40%	5.14%	1.00%	0.51%
2011	0.88%	0.19%	1.20%	0.47%	4.25%	1.03%	0.61%
2010	1.06%	0.24%	1.38%	0.69%	5.34%	1.57%	0.75%
2009	1.23%	0.22%	1.28%	0.38%	4.40%	0.98%	0.76%
2008	1.27%	0.40%	1.23%	0.64%	4.25%	0.76%	0.96%
2007	1.13%	0.44%	1.15%	0.61%	4.01%	0.63%	0.91%

Diversity visas issued and adjustments of status
Region, country or territory	2024	2023	2022	2021	2020	2019	2018	2017	2016	2015	2014	2013	2012	2011	2010	2009	2008	2007	2006	2005	2004	2003	2002	2001	2000	1999	1998	1997	1996	1995
Africa	22,632	21,176	19,215	5,801	6,017	20,336	20,532	19,211	20,706	19,686	22,703	23,607	13,582	24,015	24,745	24,648	22,960	18,046	19,548	19,118	17,146	19,227	16,404	18,081	16,998	18,413	16,727	18,928	20,512	20,314
Asia	9,851	9,804	11,693	4,498	4,055	6,079	6,290	7,650	8,898	7,570	8,500	9,785	6,481	9,167	8,824	7,759	7,335	7,151	7,402	6,462	6,310	6,557	6,346	6,801	5,263	6,485	7,461	6,757	6,164	6,864
Europe	18,950	22,265	21,806	5,795	7,643	17,897	20,434	20,516	15,207	19,811	18,904	17,296	13,093	16,378	16,083	14,241	14,788	12,633	15,626	19,330	21,721	22,323	18,056	17,837	22,385	25,685	24,228	26,078	24,505	24,289
North America (Note: The only eligible country in North America is The Bahamas. Canada is not eligible for the program.)	10	7	12	21	13	8	2	3	5	7	2	16	3	2	13	1	5	6	9	10	12	6	8	16	17	4	7	9	10	6
Oceania	1,138	863	1,195	631	543	592	824	766	532	844	761	838	562	578	639	605	710	541	831	769	692	675	625	801	787	797	704	712	707	800
South America (Note: The region of South America also includes eligible countries in Central America and the Caribbean.)	1,973	1,878	1,961	2,166	854	977	1,631	1,830	1,370	1,459	1,472	1,029	742	978	1,008	782	835	1,699	2,729	2,462	2,163	2,024	1,929	1,914	2,265	2,731	2,438	2,543	2,264	2,785
Total	54,554	55,993	55,882	18,912	19,125	45,889	49,713	49,976	46,718	49,377	52,342	52,571	34,463	51,118	51,312	48,036	46,633	40,076	46,145	48,151	48,044	50,812	43,368	45,450	47,715	54,115	51,565	55,027	54,162	55,058
Afghanistan	1,017	573	723	87	165	265	231	144	192	28	95	59	43	25	66	46	32	16	25	9	25	8	30	96	21	64	57	56	69	132
Albania	1,161	1,568	2,054	270	1,296	2,284	2,630	2,436	1,506	1,910	1,571	994	528	965	1,645	2,033	2,057	1,229	1,564	2,279	2,207	2,035	2,086	3,483	3,428	3,850	3,706	3,850	2,487	672
Algeria	2,408	3,846	2,380	814	783	1,649	1,346	996	1,277	1,093	971	1,058	343	846	797	798	823	338	476	420	300	343	572	441	501	673	553	321	669	511
Andorra	0	0	0	0	0	0	0	0	0	2	0	0	0	0	0	0	0	0	0	0	0	0	0	0	0	0	0	0	0	0
Angola	199	255	293	17	9	60	20	12	37	8	10	13	7	15	6	14	4	4	6	2	2	5	2	3	1	1	1	11	10	19
Antigua and Barbuda	1	3	0	2	0	1	0	1	0	4	6	6	0	1	6	1	0	1	1	1	4	0	0	0	2	1	0	1	7	2
Argentina	55	84	106	92	11	49	32	36	30	52	73	32	37	57	91	62	60	45	58	69	102	143	96	59	139	147	85	94	92	49
Armenia	1,093	2,328	1,308	133	373	1,313	1,662	1,566	1,000	1,556	1,272	903	644	1,013	1,001	950	837	567	484	581	531	449	329	363	378	530	472	1,090	1,331	766
Aruba	0	0	0	0	0	0	1	0	0	0	0	0	1	1	0	4	6	2	0	0	0	2	0	0	0	1	0	1	0	2
Australia	158	98	500	221	263	340	507	398	331	486	406	433	292	275	285	187	238	174	318	331	172	215	99	157	211	218	121	132	103	191
Austria	6	8	18	15	9	4	14	34	10	48	24	42	34	69	56	54	30	30	29	38	35	43	36	46	61	75	84	97	86	139
Azerbaijan	776	521	720	188	189	822	508	434	204	289	190	190	149	222	207	217	163	77	111	157	199	164	153	141	175	181	207	181	256	232
Bahamas	10	7	12	21	13	8	2	3	5	7	2	16	3	2	13	1	5	6	9	10	12	6	8	16	17	4	7	9	10	6
Bahrain	0	3	4	2	2	3	0	1	2	2	2	4	10	2	1	4	0	1	0	1	5	6	1	4	4	5	0	2	0	5
Bangladesh	ineligible	ineligible	ineligible	ineligible	ineligible	ineligible	ineligible	ineligible	ineligible	ineligible	ineligible	ineligible	295	3,090	3,017	2,663	2,286	3,518	3,421	2,542	1,837	755	1,101	1,556	1,559	1,882	3,347	3,362	2,943	3,288
Barbados	2	0	0	0	0	0	0	2	0	6	8	0	4	6	14	3	2	4	3	3	1	2	1	5	6	7	9	5	10	10
Belarus	835	1,052	863	503	361	929	828	801	568	868	844	848	285	684	734	780	769	517	499	531	556	623	465	512	505	415	405	286	304	259
Belgium	9	11	18	11	6	16	27	42	13	34	24	39	47	26	54	39	32	20	15	25	21	26	21	25	50	76	47	68	101	122
Belize	0	0	0	0	0	0	2	3	0	0	1	12	1	8	3	5	7	3	0	0	0	1	0	3	15	4	2	8	0	2
Benin	432	274	266	58	92	364	237	237	282	193	182	230	82	220	223	198	183	121	139	84	43	59	22	26	25	21	30	29	14	7
Bhutan	97	78	80	18	5	20	7	7	9	1	7	8	4	4	0	5	7	0	2	1	2	3	0	0	0	0	0	1	0	0
Bolivia	42	14	29	19	4	7	12	10	24	23	26	33	28	30	76	53	79	36	94	50	30	49	41	14	21	30	22	50	61	41
Bosnia and Herzegovina	23	33	61	15	14	23	47	84	48	77	39	30	44	33	37	62	31	40	42	41	34	30	13	34	47	37	35	70	83	112
Botswana	3	0	4	0	0	2	0	3	1	4	2	1	0	5	9	0	10	1	1	3	2	2	6	4	5	0	1	5	0	4
Brazil	ineligible	ineligible	ineligible	ineligible	ineligible	ineligible	ineligible	ineligible	ineligible	ineligible	ineligible	ineligible	ineligible	ineligible	ineligible	ineligible	ineligible	232	160	231	107	206	99	211	300	232	219	213	219	194
Brunei	0	0	1	0	0	0	2	0	0	0	1	1	0	1	0	0	1	0	0	1	2	2	0	0	0	0	1	0	0	0
Bulgaria	44	87	142	82	109	230	343	540	614	834	1,026	965	456	653	571	753	1,093	1,328	1,711	2,583	2,470	2,796	1,925	2,416	2,818	3,733	3,545	2,224	772	1,355
Burkina Faso	119	94	45	7	24	95	110	138	132	122	120	223	103	117	109	92	117	31	53	19	10	7	0	4	6	2	3	4	1	0
Burundi	616	92	140	43	50	141	97	75	64	47	37	28	11	28	42	22	9	2	16	5	13	2	0	1	1	5	3	1	7	7
Cambodia	96	66	166	51	69	86	121	198	266	152	334	399	188	168	132	120	92	89	52	35	56	47	49	75	50	34	10	5	26	32
Cameroon	2,050	1,408	1,705	653	460	1,661	1,626	1,214	1,625	1,455	1,289	1,619	847	1,706	1,581	1,530	1,190	748	804	626	495	526	460	353	348	682	387	546	344	312
Cape Verde	10	20	0	0	3	3	1	2	0	12	2	7	0	10	0	8	0	2	0	0	0	0	2	2	0	0	35	69	112	66
Central African Republic	8	3	8	0	0	7	4	2	8	3	1	3	0	2	11	3	0	0	1	2	1	2	3	2	0	4	0	5	11	0
Chad	215	102	136	25	12	22	18	10	18	15	9	10	3	16	6	10	7	7	3	9	6	3	5	17	3	8	2	8	7	5
Chile	10	13	12	20	7	14	24	13	1	10	24	12	6	16	11	31	14	28	26	13	9	3	10	6	25	38	32	36	42	24
Cocos (Keeling) Islands	1	0	0	0	0	0	0	0	0	0	0	0	0	0	0	0	0	0	0	0	0	0	0	0	0	0	0	0	0	0
Colombia	ineligible	ineligible	ineligible	ineligible	ineligible	ineligible	ineligible	ineligible	ineligible	ineligible	ineligible	ineligible	ineligible	ineligible	ineligible	ineligible	ineligible	ineligible	ineligible	ineligible	ineligible	ineligible	ineligible	ineligible	ineligible	ineligible	ineligible	2	ineligible	318
Comoros	4	3	0	0	0	5	1	1	0	0	0	1	0	2	5	2	1	2	3	1	0	0	0	0	0	0	0	0	1	1
Cook Islands	0	0	0	0	0	0	0	0	0	0	0	0	0	0	0	0	0	3	0	0	0	0	0	0	0	0	0	0	0	0
Costa Rica	22	27	3	15	6	8	10	13	10	6	25	20	2	12	17	2	3	6	12	18	7	8	1	9	42	29	19	16	6	26
Croatia	10	6	14	17	13	12	23	27	22	30	41	20	34	20	29	36	18	29	22	27	43	52	19	36	68	111	92	119	169	213
Cuba	1,129	809	612	517	361	103	187	384	536	474	302	193	70	231	140	190	256	109	364	294	402	314	503	456	579	1,123	880	1,014	358	166
Curaçao	0	0	0	0	0	0	2	0	0	0	0	4	2	1	—N/a	—N/a	—N/a	—N/a	—N/a	—N/a	—N/a	—N/a	—N/a	—N/a	—N/a	—N/a	—N/a	—N/a	—N/a	—N/a
Cyprus	3	4	5	0	1	3	5	8	8	8	7	3	2	2	8	14	5	5	9	7	3	15	5	8	29	22	14	24	28	32
Czech Republic	16	10	7	11	10	28	41	20	28	38	41	30	23	34	42	37	81	26	42	75	85	125	53	58	91	79	82	115	108	124
Democratic Republic of the Congo	488	973	903	592	478	3,096	2,874	2,669	2,778	2,641	2,442	2,235	1,221	1,522	924	601	511	317	354	296	67	288	169	154	141	112	88	76	86	97
Denmark	2	5	6	2	1	8	11	21	14	17	21	20	17	17	34	12	23	14	16	17	17	20	8	27	31	50	48	53	60	108
Djibouti	100	40	77	35	13	29	43	32	33	18	13	18	8	18	9	11	15	5	5	2	3	8	2	4	5	3	8	6	10	7
Dominica	2	2	1	1	0	4	0	3	4	2	6	11	9	10	15	21	3	4	2	6	5	8	1	15	18	16	13	8	11	6
Ecuador	221	219	163	102	62	82	287	ineligible	ineligible	ineligible	ineligible	ineligible	ineligible	ineligible	ineligible	ineligible	113	75	138	131	391	181	176	348	137	131	140	224	234	281
Egypt	2,627	2,714	2,147	447	1,297	3,312	3,466	3,580	2,855	3,456	3,500	3,383	2,013	3,268	3,253	3,651	3,310	3,527	3,538	3,511	1,726	982	1,106	1,284	1,525	1,952	1,910	1,930	2,087	3,081
Equatorial Guinea	0	0	0	1	5	1	2	0	0	0	0	0	0	0	2	0	1	0	1	0	0	1	0	1	2	3	2	0	0	0
Eritrea	53	35	57	15	11	116	139	81	149	186	173	245	144	381	368	392	302	194	162	168	94	142	96	311	113	130	354	652	279	484
Estonia	8	12	10	2	2	9	24	13	10	21	17	23	12	21	13	16	19	16	14	19	26	33	21	22	49	65	26	46	51	60
Eswatini	0	0	0	0	0	0	1	0	5	0	0	0	1	3	0	2	0	1	2	3	0	0	0	0	1	1	1	2	0	1
Ethiopia	1,373	585	621	67	339	1,696	2,106	2,560	2,143	2,469	2,543	2,393	1,419	3,536	3,774	3,690	3,549	3,248	3,502	3,492	3,659	3,784	3,222	3,464	1,482	2,728	2,163	3,051	3,272	3,539
Faroe Islands	0	0	0	0	0	1	0	0	0	0	0	0	0	0	0	—N/a	—N/a	—N/a	—N/a	—N/a	—N/a	—N/a	—N/a	—N/a	—N/a	—N/a	—N/a	—N/a	—N/a	—N/a
Fiji	869	676	537	292	216	139	184	214	130	185	218	254	174	174	232	291	313	273	336	281	410	317	459	488	412	461	478	460	538	494
Finland	12	13	15	5	4	18	21	29	22	29	16	25	35	40	34	22	9	13	31	26	29	15	15	14	25	61	80	77	189	157
France	83	107	119	70	57	208	257	258	211	346	326	228	186	275	272	241	308	197	188	184	159	215	147	160	292	429	333	291	343	508
French Guiana	0	0	0	0	0	—N/a	—N/a	—N/a	—N/a	—N/a	—N/a	—N/a	—N/a	0	0	0	0	0	0	0	0	0	0	0	0	0	0	0	0	1
French Polynesia	0	0	0	0	0	0	0	0	0	0	0	1	1	0	0	0	0	0	0	1	2	4	0	0	1	0	0	3	0	2
French Southern and Antarctic Lands	0	0	0	0	0	0	0	0	0	0	0	0	0	0	0	0	0	0	0	1	0	0	0	0	0	0	0	0	0	0
Gabon	29	19	20	8	3	16	7	13	9	12	18	6	10	7	7	5	18	9	8	5	2	20	5	0	3	2	3	2	10	3
Gambia	11	22	40	3	6	16	20	15	6	13	7	11	11	14	15	26	7	12	24	22	3	4	4	18	13	12	41	38	77	66
Georgia	1,130	768	1,290	265	399	662	676	548	368	507	345	411	293	461	441	360	284	221	225	179	314	193	122	136	104	190	137	133	264	148
Germany	127	245	309	88	92	203	311	284	293	535	497	584	595	860	964	910	817	536	540	572	510	472	454	757	1,191	1,617	1,195	1,074	1,038	998
Ghana	576	659	355	229	111	640	777	803	432	526	1,460	1,895	1,689	2,460	2,660	1,912	1,868	978	1,209	1,134	805	1,610	1,809	1,125	1,972	1,798	2,057	2,720	3,850	2,265
Greece	19	45	51	8	19	59	71	96	54	98	79	54	30	42	43	76	84	55	54	62	58	41	39	38	66	73	42	76	127	171
Grenada	0	0	0	0	0	1	0	6	1	2	6	1	7	2	4	1	1	2	1	2	0	0	3	0	8	2	6	6	13	31
Guadeloupe	—N/a	—N/a	—N/a	—N/a	—N/a	—N/a	—N/a	—N/a	—N/a	—N/a	—N/a	—N/a	—N/a	0	0	0	2	0	0	0	5	0	1	0	2	2	0	0	0	2
Guatemala	64	32	ineligible	ineligible	11	19	35	13	9	20	44	ineligible	ineligible	ineligible	ineligible	ineligible	30	13	9	4	5	5	11	17	33	46	82	103	75	170
Guinea	255	343	377	41	38	300	155	205	293	262	264	257	113	185	268	86	109	35	49	20	23	18	25	38	24	53	87	55	64	76
Guinea-Bissau	3	8	10	0	1	3	0	1	0	2	0	7	0	1	0	0	0	0	0	4	2	1	1	0	0	0	0	0	0	3
Guyana	5	7	1	1	0	6	8	2	4	14	6	16	7	30	32	19	7	7	29	12	15	21	17	9	29	52	47	47	63	167
Haiti	ineligible	ineligible	ineligible	ineligible	ineligible	ineligible	ineligible	ineligible	ineligible	ineligible	ineligible	ineligible	ineligible	ineligible	ineligible	ineligible	ineligible	ineligible	ineligible	ineligible	ineligible	ineligible	ineligible	ineligible	ineligible	87	69	46	72	181
Honduras	ineligible	ineligible	ineligible	46	20	15	49	30	26	31	38	24	23	26	26	10	14	5	11	6	10	9	3	21	23	17	53	34	71	68
Hong Kong	ineligible	ineligible	ineligible	153	58	46	56	18	55	34	46	40	10	27	23	32	48	37	49	50	88	113	109	79	101	203	215	375	250	328
Hungary	36	29	65	50	33	38	84	83	79	121	103	112	80	125	65	138	82	67	87	118	71	122	57	93	100	144	168	172	251	226
Iceland	0	0	5	4	0	0	1	9	1	11	10	15	15	13	30	9	4	7	6	1	7	9	8	7	20	10	22	29	51	32
Indonesia	29	45	106	85	58	63	64	41	45	44	68	66	100	89	122	122	156	148	152	111	213	399	329	223	447	161	152	98	89	71
Iran	1,823	1,049	2,024	244	131	298	318	2,106	2,788	2,661	2,386	3,802	2,428	2,023	1,854	1,117	841	839	543	450	363	365	785	525	313	334	383	326	280	281
Iraq	314	412	650	30	86	264	297	150	146	23	49	66	36	57	37	50	88	48	32	19	37	16	57	61	34	57	41	45	34	41
Ireland	4	2	15	10	3	21	37	31	36	50	44	52	76	87	61	51	51	50	55	76	113	157	65	86	204	318	367	459	518	481
Israel	15	5	52	40	26	64	49	34	35	20	58	74	45	41	30	43	47	38	50	40	109	66	87	58	28	68	45	24	56	36
Italy	66	77	161	120	66	141	162	244	194	289	282	157	207	186	167	161	128	86	91	90	74	126	50	56	128	280	274	262	282	413
Ivory Coast	241	272	383	144	76	424	386	442	510	377	376	325	156	297	230	215	194	138	103	89	62	117	42	70	72	58	133	119	140	102
Japan	81	104	331	237	135	223	164	117	194	143	269	287	216	177	199	207	282	231	246	264	450	633	447	259	293	431	322	297	230	134
Jordan	417	480	713	542	266	330	254	96	176	72	181	122	62	87	72	95	25	37	52	29	27	51	79	43	47	104	72	28	46	71
Kazakhstan	981	1,310	865	325	392	576	514	460	243	460	325	316	237	236	201	200	172	108	135	159	251	242	268	263	255	259	256	129	217	82
Kenya	2,651	812	1,157	278	393	1,207	1,220	1,014	1,116	903	1,216	1,281	752	1,918	2,420	2,365	2,187	1,333	1,807	1,786	1,993	2,272	1,487	1,014	897	884	835	505	544	862
Kiribati	8	0	0	0	0	0	1	0	3	3	0	0	2	0	0	2	2	0	2	0	0	0	0	0	0	0	0	0	0	0
Kosovo	208	342	295	114	113	232	230	318	164	146	95	126	71	83	91	50	2	—N/a	—N/a	—N/a	—N/a	—N/a	—N/a	—N/a	—N/a	—N/a	—N/a	—N/a	—N/a	—N/a
Kuwait	61	64	106	52	37	51	81	45	59	29	58	66	31	25	29	10	22	14	5	13	14	16	19	22	20	24	12	14	19	16
Kyrgyzstan	1,848	1,888	1,394	358	149	383	383	223	135	286	235	189	182	147	130	122	132	81	80	94	116	138	61	67	60	81	46	24	33	34
Laos	4	7	11	0	7	0	1	0	0	0	0	2	0	0	3	1	0	6	0	3	7	6	2	4	1	0	9	1	4	1
Latvia	32	29	26	23	19	23	34	22	31	30	57	57	22	70	36	41	19	35	53	58	88	98	98	96	120	112	110	97	82	118
Lebanon	18	107	209	107	26	77	44	41	72	52	58	87	94	56	46	83	77	54	54	44	27	34	49	56	34	43	53	37	38	56
Lesotho	0	0	0	0	0	0	4	0	0	0	3	0	4	0	1	0	0	0	0	0	0	0	0	0	2	0	0	1	0	0
Liberia	546	393	531	46	89	653	1,249	997	1,553	1,744	1,754	1,231	786	1,003	848	831	580	507	388	309	488	439	461	314	539	503	663	570	423	320
Libya	93	286	192	59	24	72	47	115	127	72	51	82	60	44	70	56	23	11	19	16	2	55	13	16	28	19	43	11	40	56
Liechtenstein	0	0	0	0	0	0	0	0	0	0	0	0	0	1	0	0	0	0	0	0	0	0	0	0	0	0	0	1	4	0
Lithuania	29	60	73	43	35	109	106	96	91	167	156	141	129	167	133	106	128	192	353	638	1,385	2,039	1,139	958	901	823	1,020	484	525	436
Luxembourg	0	0	0	0	0	0	0	2	0	0	0	3	3	2	0	0	3	0	0	1	0	1	1	1	0	4	0	4	9	2
Macau	0	4	4	0	0	1	1	1	8	17	3	4	6	2	8	3	11	1	5	6	1	2	ineligible	2	7	54	53	85	157	141
Madagascar	12	7	14	7	3	16	9	2	29	9	17	23	3	17	15	27	13	5	10	4	10	10	0	8	4	15	4	19	14	13
Malawi	13	16	12	2	0	7	5	10	0	11	15	16	1	13	17	13	20	4	13	12	15	15	16	10	17	34	14	46	23	17
Malaysia	24	17	34	18	21	30	38	30	48	14	38	20	27	48	41	30	39	31	22	48	57	98	68	43	40	45	58	36	60	45
Maldives	0	0	0	0	0	4	0	0	0	0	0	0	0	0	0	0	0	0	0	0	0	0	0	0	0	0	0	0	0	0
Mali	24	35	46	6	5	25	34	15	39	23	21	29	20	23	38	43	34	22	20	8	6	11	6	11	20	19	44	53	51	60
Malta	3	0	0	1	1	1	0	0	0	0	0	0	4	0	5	0	0	0	2	0	4	6	0	2	9	6	3	3	1	15
Marshall Islands	0	0	0	0	0	0	0	0	0	0	1	0	4	0	0	0	0	0	0	0	0	0	0	0	0	0	0	0	0	0
Martinique	—N/a	—N/a	—N/a	—N/a	—N/a	—N/a	—N/a	—N/a	—N/a	—N/a	—N/a	—N/a	—N/a	0	0	1	4	2	0	0	0	0	0	0	4	1	0	2	1	0
Mauritania	54	98	86	6	7	17	13	13	6	6	0	7	3	12	2	8	3	1	7	3	6	2	8	10	11	7	5	3	2	4
Mauritius	0	0	6	1	2	5	3	2	11	16	6	4	7	24	20	21	22	3	2	4	15	11	8	10	16	20	22	15	27	32
Micronesia	0	0	0	0	0	1	0	0	0	0	0	0	0	0	0	0	0	0	0	0	0	0	0	0	0	0	0	0	0	0
Moldova	238	358	481	168	226	626	574	1,369	1,189	1,566	1,211	906	684	582	399	273	279	163	152	193	325	244	173	151	198	185	166	102	192	153
Monaco	0	0	0	0	2	1	0	0	0	0	4	0	0	0	0	0	1	0	0	0	1	0	0	0	0	1	0	0	0	1
Mongolia	84	153	196	197	114	143	160	97	157	55	79	116	91	209	108	129	199	70	112	42	19	34	40	16	4	9	13	0	0	3
Montenegro	10	17	33	5	10	20	14	13	7	6	11	11	5	4	11	4	8	29	1	—N/a	—N/a	—N/a	—N/a	—N/a	—N/a	—N/a	—N/a	—N/a	—N/a	—N/a
Morocco	2,358	2,773	2,559	1,126	719	1,132	1,011	1,080	1,115	912	864	894	376	987	1,782	2,004	2,129	1,672	1,831	2,243	1,753	2,045	1,205	3,365	2,180	2,294	1,255	1,270	383	769
Mozambique	1	0	1	0	4	1	0	3	0	1	5	0	2	0	3	1	0	1	0	0	2	3	2	6	3	0	0	4	7	11
Myanmar	531	662	422	96	82	210	125	148	140	88	200	267	197	253	282	371	113	95	463	292	192	237	462	384	329	276	232	204	140	141
Namibia	4	0	6	0	4	0	4	5	3	7	0	7	2	4	0	10	0	0	3	5	2	3	0	1	3	3	3	0	2	4
Nauru	0	1	0	0	0	0	0	0	0	0	0	0	0	6	0	0	0	1	1	0	0	0	0	0	0	0	0	0	0	0
Nepal	3,036	3,375	3,345	1,372	2,085	2,795	3,307	3,477	3,247	3,370	3,504	3,377	1,953	2,017	1,936	1,615	2,073	1,191	1,457	1,789	1,775	1,754	521	283	87	159	168	102	82	74
Netherlands	5	5	14	13	17	27	19	31	40	46	71	35	61	52	80	103	68	45	52	51	40	52	25	27	61	102	100	124	186	241
Netherlands Antilles	—N/a	—N/a	—N/a	—N/a	—N/a	—N/a	—N/a	—N/a	—N/a	—N/a	—N/a	—N/a	—N/a	0	1	12	3	2	6	11	1	3	5	0	6	7	1	6	6	7
New Caledonia	4	0	0	0	0	0	0	0	0	0	1	0	0	0	0	0	0	2	0	0	0	0	0	1	0	0	0	0	0	0
New Zealand	37	58	119	104	53	92	115	127	66	149	132	131	87	109	80	84	117	70	118	131	79	118	62	132	113	93	82	80	51	79
Nicaragua	33	58	14	53	7	5	4	3	5	4	2	28	7	22	20	26	14	8	7	9	10	15	0	9	8	22	48	75	135	116
Niger	28	10	33	7	8	22	21	6	15	15	18	18	3	20	20	21	42	20	26	13	11	18	15	12	8	10	2	6	10	2
Nigeria	ineligible	ineligible	ineligible	ineligible	ineligible	ineligible	ineligible	ineligible	ineligible	ineligible	2,467	3,274	1,887	2,810	2,834	3,275	3,425	3,183	3,271	2,528	3,335	3,386	2,694	2,854	3,262	3,008	3,008	3,750	3,858	3,852
Norfolk Island	0	0	0	0	0	0	0	0	0	5	0	0	0	0	0	—N/a	—N/a	—N/a	—N/a	—N/a	—N/a	—N/a	—N/a	—N/a	—N/a	—N/a	—N/a	—N/a	—N/a	—N/a
North Korea	0	0	0	1	1	0	1	0	0	0	0	0	0	0	0	0	0	5	0	0	3	2	0	0	3	0	1	2	3	12
North Macedonia	114	188	224	61	61	194	284	235	206	263	183	148	68	177	150	205	219	163	151	183	106	123	111	133	169	210	209	172	256	106
Northern Ireland	0	0	2	0	0	3	2	4	6	15	18	14	15	17	10	13	3	16	20	31	24	26	5	18	27	52	54	47	79	100
Norway	3	4	8	0	3	2	12	9	3	4	0	16	9	12	12	11	10	17	19	9	8	14	5	8	23	32	35	23	90	100
Oman	5	15	17	3	2	8	5	6	4	1	2	1	2	0	2	1	5	1	1	3	0	2	0	3	4	0	0	1	3	1
Pakistan	ineligible	ineligible	ineligible	ineligible	ineligible	ineligible	ineligible	ineligible	ineligible	ineligible	ineligible	ineligible	ineligible	ineligible	ineligible	ineligible	ineligible	ineligible	ineligible	ineligible	ineligible	ineligible	ineligible	2,484	1,469	2,109	1,772	1,365	1,426	1,823
Palau	0	0	0	0	1	0	0	0	0	0	0	0	0	0	3	0	0	0	0	0	0	2	0	0	2	0	0	0	0	0
Panama	2	0	4	4	6	0	4	0	1	5	7	5	7	5	17	9	5	6	10	4	13	3	5	6	27	17	9	10	15	13
Papua New Guinea	0	6	10	2	2	4	0	1	0	1	2	9	0	1	8	12	2	5	0	3	0	7	3	1	6	3	2	0	0	1
Paraguay	7	3	0	0	6	5	1	2	2	2	1	4	6	4	17	3	5	7	2	7	8	2	0	7	2	19	12	3	11	7
Peru	345	575	119	653	ineligible	ineligible	ineligible	ineligible	ineligible	ineligible	ineligible	ineligible	ineligible	ineligible	ineligible	ineligible	ineligible	922	1,566	1,406	863	810	813	571	401	411	355	293	434	468
Poland	95	120	192	92	37	215	277	287	327	412	500	829	ineligible	ineligible	ineligible	ineligible	ineligible	ineligible	2,090	2,957	3,256	2,899	2,631	ineligible	ineligible	ineligible	ineligible	3,838	3,849	3,851
Portugal	2	7	13	7	4	5	25	15	11	29	27	20	16	17	9	16	12	8	6	15	22	28	9	16	24	36	74	168	227	576
Qatar	35	43	60	11	5	24	26	9	16	15	15	14	3	0	0	0	1	0	6	0	3	0	3	3	2	4	2	1	1	0
Republic of the Congo	67	77	136	50	37	166	100	42	50	49	55	47	12	45	34	20	43	27	25	18	3	6	5	8	5	10	5	3	0	6
Réunion	—N/a	—N/a	—N/a	—N/a	—N/a	—N/a	—N/a	—N/a	—N/a	—N/a	—N/a	—N/a	—N/a	0	0	1	0	1	0	0	1	0	0	0	0	0	0	0	0	0
Romania	78	127	188	106	94	242	199	321	342	539	498	423	589	482	366	343	876	893	1,258	1,515	1,147	1,425	953	1,899	2,460	3,268	3,026	2,667	1,933	2,727
Russia	2,436	2,988	2,784	414	947	2,506	2,175	1,812	1,401	2,028	1,928	1,680	1,096	1,552	1,095	ineligible	ineligible	ineligible	ineligible	ineligible	1,333	1,521	1,275	1,494	2,564	2,209	2,013	1,937	2,165	2,581
Rwanda	379	658	661	155	115	338	277	161	242	199	139	158	43	64	65	32	44	19	16	15	8	5	6	40	5	42	17	15	20	10
Saint Kitts and Nevis	0	0	0	0	0	0	0	0	0	1	0	5	3	0	2	2	2	0	2	0	1	0	1	1	1	0	2	0	0	0
Saint Lucia	3	3	0	0	0	0	9	10	1	5	15	9	1	9	7	4	2	1	1	1	0	2	2	0	4	5	7	3	6	4
Saint Vincent and the Grenadines	0	0	0	0	0	0	0	0	2	3	5	9	1	4	5	3	1	0	0	0	1	0	1	1	5	6	6	4	2	7
Samoa	0	4	1	1	0	1	4	0	0	0	0	0	2	4	9	2	11	1	5	2	6	0	0	3	6	4	2	0	1	2
São Tomé and Príncipe	0	0	0	0	0	0	0	0	0	0	0	0	0	0	0	0	0	0	0	0	0	0	0	0	0	0	0	3	0	0
Saudi Arabia	229	205	450	117	143	262	218	111	124	89	109	88	56	41	34	37	29	13	18	19	7	16	25	34	43	40	17	5	12	13
Senegal	62	117	109	10	13	83	94	98	139	104	109	91	51	128	128	163	104	71	74	66	33	60	58	98	47	120	142	181	264	392
Serbia	110	104	152	23	67	213	245	314	213	216	206	171	120	156	158	211	351	261	13	—N/a	—N/a	—N/a	—N/a	—N/a	—N/a	—N/a	—N/a	—N/a	—N/a	—N/a
Serbia and Montenegro	—N/a	—N/a	—N/a	—N/a	—N/a	—N/a	—N/a	—N/a	—N/a	—N/a	—N/a	—N/a	—N/a	—N/a	—N/a	—N/a	—N/a	—N/a	252	201	205	208	109	279	373	304	407	400	489	812
Seychelles	0	0	4	0	0	1	0	0	0	3	0	0	1	0	0	3	0	2	3	0	0	0	3	0	1	0	0	0	0	0
Sierra Leone	251	293	207	70	13	172	119	340	383	354	449	719	287	317	314	547	438	206	175	138	159	146	810	776	830	373	500	867	1,026	429
Singapore	5	6	17	6	8	11	8	9	12	2	32	6	14	12	11	14	21	8	17	13	27	45	37	26	20	15	10	10	13	1
Sint Maarten	0	2	3	0	0	0	0	0	0	1	0	0	0	0	—N/a	—N/a	—N/a	—N/a	—N/a	—N/a	—N/a	—N/a	—N/a	—N/a	—N/a	—N/a	—N/a	—N/a	—N/a	—N/a
Slovakia	10	8	21	4	8	13	26	31	26	44	36	36	17	37	43	45	67	96	128	213	217	290	190	228	194	277	253	465	419	406
Slovenia	2	2	2	5	2	4	3	12	8	5	1	4	2	2	5	7	6	4	1	1	9	2	4	1	8	10	5	18	17	16
Solomon Islands	0	0	0	0	0	0	0	0	0	0	0	0	0	0	0	0	0	0	0	0	2	0	0	0	0	0	0	0	0	0
Somalia	501	253	82	4	0	2	11	56	104	59	46	78	28	52	71	70	40	21	42	61	38	98	211	376	644	347	285	226	301	351
South Africa	91	116	266	106	38	180	175	215	182	197	217	319	225	309	303	301	235	151	164	161	132	342	265	201	406	367	467	369	694	953
South Sudan	14	3	18	3	2	4	10	6	11	1	0	0	0	0	—N/a	—N/a	—N/a	—N/a	—N/a	—N/a	—N/a	—N/a	—N/a	—N/a	—N/a	—N/a	—N/a	—N/a	—N/a	—N/a
Spain	25	31	96	47	38	77	85	108	101	183	183	95	75	86	80	75	56	49	35	61	29	52	25	17	56	80	96	107	151	222
Sri Lanka	391	883	583	438	225	331	360	160	324	201	301	296	217	336	441	548	466	299	259	286	287	592	403	261	162	270	312	281	187	200
Sudan	1,814	1,980	1,704	249	403	1,548	1,680	1,174	1,833	1,191	965	436	308	569	557	592	502	279	359	384	223	511	611	861	1,133	1,425	888	699	1,002	692
Suriname	0	2	0	0	0	0	0	0	2	2	4	3	1	0	3	1	2	3	0	0	0	7	1	4	7	9	3	6	5	25
Sweden	4	8	11	9	8	11	33	53	46	48	35	62	62	43	54	46	50	61	50	46	43	72	35	56	115	160	126	140	284	234
Switzerland	4	14	20	15	10	13	20	35	31	56	61	40	50	69	79	96	71	44	72	58	78	93	50	79	176	251	272	394	202	209
Syria	143	137	240	84	36	83	55	128	164	134	138	91	72	67	37	53	40	16	20	17	10	28	31	43	22	23	49	26	56	23
Taiwan	77	114	301	178	142	180	174	160	167	103	215	160	158	214	231	251	275	275	266	252	577	1,091	1,344	ineligible	ineligible	ineligible	ineligible	ineligible	ineligible	ineligible
Tajikistan	1,596	1,676	723	243	159	919	698	419	239	339	248	209	152	182	121	80	66	33	27	32	54	35	63	26	80	56	44	42	26	51
Tanzania	72	122	66	21	10	50	39	46	32	60	28	51	62	81	65	137	72	81	122	104	83	191	137	115	137	197	106	185	214	322
Thailand	176	444	142	51	36	60	32	19	31	26	19	31	22	36	32	49	45	37	46	60	63	119	155	90	69	65	64	31	45	20
Timor-Leste	0	0	0	0	0	0	0	0	0	0	0	0	0	0	0	1	0	0	0	0	0	—N/a	—N/a	—N/a	—N/a	—N/a	—N/a	—N/a	—N/a	—N/a
Togo	888	871	838	186	208	757	664	504	688	547	565	514	281	526	507	483	469	468	458	1,084	1,314	1,434	564	441	328	199	256	120	100	40
Tonga	65	18	28	11	8	15	13	24	1	15	2	11	1	9	22	27	27	14	51	21	23	16	2	20	37	18	19	40	14	33
Trinidad and Tobago	25	23	16	18	8	6	29	17	20	53	62	45	43	53	103	76	48	55	60	34	32	28	30	52	209	139	184	106	164	253
Tunisia	94	102	136	60	38	47	62	63	100	38	40	49	26	42	68	53	43	46	47	46	38	33	60	42	74	66	81	50	95	88
Turkey	1,186	1,476	1,330	588	708	1,387	1,821	1,386	796	1,245	1,084	712	899	993	1,058	1,041	972	755	709	826	1,192	1,180	702	590	669	931	1,520	1,613	1,556	1,404
Turkmenistan	492	381	547	235	61	177	157	93	75	105	106	70	72	85	77	59	78	40	44	46	50	41	18	22	23	26	45	21	23	5
Tuvalu	0	0	0	0	0	0	0	2	0	0	0	0	0	0	0	0	0	0	0	0	0	0	0	0	0	0	0	0	0	0
Uganda	647	218	206	69	64	133	177	92	166	171	184	204	111	211	158	170	152	122	96	98	73	100	100	66	62	112	113	143	189	196
Ukraine	1,142	1,787	2,636	938	1,101	2,062	2,653	2,040	1,787	1,313	1,770	1,844	1,439	1,676	1,807	1,714	1,914	3,333	3,119	3,309	3,191	2,935	3,395	2,443	3,491	3,461	2,657	1,982	2,195	2,147
United Arab Emirates	51	95	85	50	71	78	64	31	28	40	36	40	41	22	5	11	3	13	10	6	11	7	22	33	29	15	8	2	18	6
Uruguay	5	4	0	2	5	7	9	8	8	5	9	1	3	4	8	7	12	2	4	3	21	20	13	5	16	8	5	10	18	19
Uzbekistan	2,830	2,398	2,413	89	314	823	2,058	3,199	2,378	2,524	3,032	3,385	3,212	3,596	3,356	2,388	2,274	1,067	958	926	975	787	614	442	449	338	256	183	232	177
Vanuatu	0	2	0	0	0	0	0	0	1	0	0	0	0	0	0	0	0	0	0	0	0	0	0	0	0	0	0	0	0	0
Venezuela	ineligible	ineligible	881	621	340	645	929	1,274	684	735	802	560	476	448	391	253	155	125	169	158	126	187	101	85	208	133	129	126	140	137
Yemen	1,092	662	625	228	13	70	28	267	397	171	200	195	66	40	33	51	22	21	22	23	17	12	91	37	28	45	36	20	34	10
Zambia	49	37	30	11	4	12	14	17	20	33	18	39	18	48	41	38	65	42	27	26	39	60	55	61	56	47	77	98	55	60
Zimbabwe	99	132	142	70	3	28	54	44	85	47	32	68	42	89	65	96	47	29	84	69	47	47	51	43	37	44	30	66	117	117

== Deceptive agencies ==
The only way to enter the Diversity Visa lottery is by completing and sending the electronic form available at the U.S. Department of State website during the registration period. There are numerous companies and websites that charge a fee in order to complete the form for the applicant. The Department of State and the Federal Trade Commission have warned that some of these businesses falsely claim to increase someone's chances of winning the lottery, or that they are affiliated with the U.S. government.

There have also been numerous cases of fraudulent emails and letters which falsely claim to have been sent by the Department of State and that the recipient has been granted a permanent resident card. These messages prompt the recipients to transfer a "visa processing fee" as a prerequisite for obtaining a "guaranteed" green card. The messages are sometimes sent to people who never participated in the lottery and can look trustworthy as they contain the recipient's exact name and contact details and what appears to be a legal notice.

The Department of State has issued a warning against the scammers. It notes that any email claiming the recipient to be a winner of the lottery is fake because the Department has never notified and will not notify winners by email. The Department has urged recipients of such messages to notify the Internet Crime Complaint Center about the scam.

The office of inspector general has identified multiple problems with the lottery in several countries, including Ukraine, Ghana, and Albania in embassy inspection reports.

According to testimony from Stephen A. Edson before the House Judiciary Committee, "in Bangladesh, for example, one agent is reported to have enrolled an entire phone book so that he could then either extort money from winning applicants who had never entered the program to begin with or sell their winning slots to others."

== Impact ==
=== Economic ===
Labor economists and others have credited the Diversity Visa program for providing economic benefits to the United States and enhancing the competitiveness of the U.S. labor force.

Research by Lewis and several other economists shows that diverse and low-skilled immigrants lift the wages of native-born workers, as those immigrants are less substitutable to native-born workers.

Charles Kenny, an economist at the Center for Global Development, noted that research by Harvard economist Alberto Alesina found that countries with a higher share of foreign-born populations tended to have more innovation and higher incomes.

=== Security ===
In 2004, the State Department's deputy inspector general warned that there were security risks to granting visas to winners from countries with ties to terrorism. A 2007 Government Accountability Office report however found no evidence that recipients of diversity visas posed a threat.

According to PolitiFact, "there is at least one documented example of an individual who migrated through the diversity visa system and was later arrested on terrorism-related charges. But it is unclear that the diversity lottery has historically been used as a strategic entry point for terrorists."

The uncle of Akayed Ullah, the man who set off a bomb on a New York City Subway platform in 2017, won a diversity lottery, which enabled him to bring his nephew to the United States under the family reunification provisions of the Immigration and Nationality Act of 1965.

Experts on immigration note that the chances of winning the lottery are low and those who do win the lottery still have to undergo background checks and vetting, which makes the diversity lottery program a poor choice for immigrants considering launching terrorist attacks in the United States.

According to the Cato Institute, immigrants from the countries with the highest percentage of diversity visas have vastly lower incarceration rates than native-born Americans. The Cato Institute also points out that the number of people who have come to the United States through the Diversity Visa Lottery and who have subsequently committed terrorism is in the single digits, out of a grand total of millions of total Diversity Visa Lottery winners over the decades.
