= List of terrorist incidents in New York City =

New York City, the largest and most populous city in the United States, has been the target of numerous acts of terrorism throughout the 20th and 21st centuries. The city, in particular, was one of the targets of the September 11 attacks, the single deadliest terrorist attack in history, which saw the destruction of the World Trade Center and the loss of 2,753 lives. The most recent fatal terrorist incident was a vehicle-ramming attack in Lower Manhattan, which killed eight people and injured eleven on October 31, 2017.

== Incidents ==
=== 20th century ===
Date	Method	Perpetrator	Motive	K	I	Description
July 4, 1914	Bombing	Premature explosion of bombs stored by Anarchist Black Cross	Planned to blow up John D. Rockefeller's home in Tarrytown, New York	4	20	A large quantity of dynamite, and a lot of guns in a backpack which was apparently being used to construct a bomb to blow up John D. Rockefeller's Tarrytown home, exploded prematurely at a new seven-story model tenement on Lexington Avenue in East Harlem, Manhattan, killing three conspirators and another renter who was not part of the bomb plot.
September 16, 1920	Bombing (animal-borne)	Unknown; suspected to be Galleanist anarchists	Possible revenge for the arrests of Sacco and Vanzetti and/or the deportation of Luigi Galleani	38	143	A bomb exploded on September 16, 1920, in the Financial District of Manhattan, New York City. The blast killed 38 people and seriously injured 143, and the total number of injured was in the hundreds. The bombing was never solved, although investigators and historians believe the Wall Street bombing was carried out by Galleanists (Italian anarchists), a group responsible for a series of bombings the previous year.
1940 to 1956	Bombings	George Metesky	Resent toward old workplace injury	0	15	Between 1940 and 1956, Metesky planted at least 33 bombs, of which 22 exploded, injuring 15 people. He had been angry and resentful about events surrounding a workplace injury suffered years earlier.
July 27 to November 12, 1969	Bombings	Sam Melville	Anti-war activism	0	20	Melville committed a series of eight bombings on various buildings in New York City in 1969. Most of these bombs detonated during the night and did not injure anyone, but one bombing occurred on the 8th floor of the Marine Midland Building in the Financial District on August 20, 1969, injuring 20 people.
March 6, 1970	Bombing	Weather Underground	Planned to blow up sites in the New York area as part of opposition to Vietnam War	3	2	On March 6, 1970, a bomb being assembled by American radical left group Weather Underground accidentally exploded at West 11th Street in Greenwich Village, Manhattan, killing three members and injuring two other members.
January 24, 1975	Bombing	FALN	Retaliation for bombing in Mayagüez, Puerto Rico	4	50+	A bomb planted in Fraunces Tavern in the Financial District exploded on January 24, 1975, killing four people and injuring more than 50 others. The Puerto Rican freedom fighters "Fuerzas Armadas de Liberación Nacional Puertorriqueña" (Armed Forces of Puerto Rican National Liberation, or FALN), which had executed other bomb incidents in New York in the 1970s, claimed responsibility. No one had been prosecuted for the bombing as of April 17, 2013.
December 29, 1975	Bombing	Unknown	Unknown	11	74	A bomb near the TWA baggage reclaim terminal in LaGuardia Airport in East Elmhurst, Queens, killed 11 and seriously injured 74. The bombing was never solved, with several suggested perpetrators, although investigators and historians believe that Croatian nationalists were the most likely.
September 11, 1976	Bombing	Croatian nationalists	Sought Croatian independence from Yugoslavia	1	30	A group of Croatian nationalists planted a bomb in a coin locker at Grand Central Terminal on September 11, 1976. The group also hijacked TWA Flight 355. After stating their political demands, they revealed the location and provided the instructions for disarming the Grand Central Terminal bomb. The disarming operation was not executed properly and the resulting explosion wounded over 30 and killed one NYPD bomb squad specialist.
August 3, 1977	Bombing	FALN	Sought Puerto Rican independence from United States	1	7	Two bombs exploded in Manhattan office buildings. The first bomb exploded in the offices of the US Department of Defense at 9:37am, but the bomb had been detected and people moved to safety. There were no injuries. The second bomb exploded about an hour later in the offices of Mobil Oil Corporation - killing one person and injuring seven. TV stations and newspapers had been contacted that morning with warnings that bombs had been placed in more offices throughout Manhattan leading to the evacuation of 100,000 office workers throughout the borough.
February 26, 1993	Truck bombing	Ramzi Yousef, Eyad Ismoil, other co-conspirators	Islamic terrorism	6	1,042	On February 26, 1993, a 1,336-pound (606 kg) urea nitrate–hydrogen gas enhanced device was detonated at the World Trade Center by Ramzi Yousef and Eyad Ismoil, with the intent of sending the North Tower (Tower 1) crashing into the South Tower (Tower 2), thus bringing both towers down and killing tens of thousands of people. in vengeance for America's support for Israel against Palestine. It failed to do so but killed six people and injured over a thousand.
March 1, 1994 February 23, 1997	Shooting Shooting	Rashid Baz Ali Hassan Abu Kamal	Islamic Terrorism Palestinian nationalism (Islamic terrorism)	1 2	3 6	On March 1, 1994, Ari Halberstam was shot on the Brooklyn Bridge while riding in a School Bus with Hebrew lettering. Ari Halberstam was declared dead from this attack on March 6, 1994. 3 other students were injured in the gun fire. On February 23, 1997, Kamal, a 69-year-old Palestinian teacher, opened fire on the observation deck of the Empire State Building in Midtown Manhattan The gunman killed one person and wounded six others before taking his own life with a gunshot to the head.

=== 21st century ===
Date	Method	Perpetrator	Motive	K	I	Description
September 11, 2001	Aircraft hijacking suicide attack	Al-Qaeda	Islamic terrorism	2,996	6,000+	American Airlines Flight 11 and United Airlines Flight 175, respectively, hijacked and flown into buildings one and two (the "Twin Towers") of the World Trade Center. The towers subsequently collapsed due to structural weakening from the impact and subsequent fire. The attack remains the deadliest terrorist attack in world history.
March 6, 2008	Bombing	Unknown	Unknown	0	0	Improvised explosive device detonated in front of a United States Armed Forces recruiting station in Times Square. A bicycling-riding suspect was captured on videotape stopping outside the recruiting station, setting the bomb and lighting the fuse, but the perpetrator was never found, despite an offer of a $115,000 reward from the FBI and New York Police Department for information leading to the arrest and conviction of the perpetrator. The FBI said in 2015 that the case may be connected to two other unsolved bombings in New York City, both involving bicycle-riding suspects: at the British consulate (2005) and the Mexican consulate (2007).
May 20, 2009	Attempted bombing and military attack	"Newburgh Four"	Islamic terrorism, antisemitism	0	0	Four men arrested in connection to a plot to shoot down military airplanes at Stewart Air National Guard Base in Newburgh, New York, and bomb two synagogues in the Bronx suburb of Riverdale.
May 1, 2010	Attempted bombing	Faisal Shahzad	Islamic terrorism	0	0	Failed car bombing of Times Square, after the device failed to detonate and was disarmed after its discovery. Shahzad was implicated and arrested two days later.
October 23, 2014	Stabbing attack	Zale H. Thompson	Islamic terrorism	1	3	Hatchet attack on four New York City Police Department (NYPD) officers in Jamaica, Queens; two officers were injured in the attack, while a passer-by was injured and the perpetrator killed in the ensuing shoot-out.
December 20, 2014	Shooting	Ismaaiyl Abdullah Brinsley	Anti-police sentiment	3	0	Ambush of two NYPD officers, Rafael Ramos and Wenjian Liu. Done out of hatred of police following the murders of Eric Garner and Michael Brown by police officers. The suspect committed suicide after the killings.
April 2, 2015	Attempted bombing	Asia Siddiqui and Noelle Velentzas	Islamic terrorism	0	0	Siddiqui and Velentzas, former roommates in Jamaica, Queens, were arrested for conspiring to carry out a pressure cooker bombing in New York City, in support of Al-Qaeda in the Arabian Peninsula and the ISIL. They were caught as part of an FBI counter-terrorism sting operation. Both pleaded guilty in 2019 to "teaching and distributing information pertaining to the making and use of an explosive, destructive device, and weapon of mass destruction, intending that it be used to commit a federal crime of violence." Siddiqui was sentenced to 15 years in January 2020.
June 13, 2015	Attempted bombing	Munther Omar Saleh, Fareed Mumuni, third undisclosed	Islamic terrorism	0	0	Saleh, Mumuni, and third unnamed conspirator arrested in connection to a plot to carry out a pressure cooker bombing in New York City in support of the Islamic State.
September 17, 2016	Bombing	Ahmad Khan Rahimi	Islamic terrorism	0	31	Rahimi, who was inspired by Osama bin Laden and Anwar al-Awlaki, placed two shrapnel-filled pressure cooker bombs in Chelsea, Manhattan. The first bomb detonated, causing a massive blast in which 30 people were injured by shrapnel. The second bomb failed to explode. Hours earlier, a bomb that Rahimi placed along a race route in Seaside Park, New Jersey. Before being captured by police, Rahimi also planted a backpack full of explosives at a New Jersey Transit station in Elizabeth, New Jersey. Rahimi was convicted by a federal jury of all charges against him for the New York bombs, involving attempted murder, aggravated assault, and weapons offenses. He was given a second life sentence in New Jersey state court for a shootout in which he attempted to kill New Jersey police officers.
March 20, 2017	Stabbing attack	James Harris Jackson	White supremacy	1	0	James Harris Jackson fatally stabbed Timothy Caughman, an African American man, in Hell's Kitchen, with a replica of a Roman sword. Caughman was the intended first victim of a Jackson's planned rampage targeting African American men. Jackson, however, turned himself to police after Caughman's murder instead. In a manifesto, Jackson wrote that he intended to precipitate an apocalyptic "Racial World War" on God's orders "to eliminate the Negro races from the face of the earth." Jackson pleaded guilty to murder and was sentenced to life imprisonment without parole.
October 31, 2017	Vehicle-ramming attack	Sayfullo Saipov	Islamist terrorism inspired by ISIL	8	12	Sayfullo Habibullaevic Saipov drove a rented pickup truck into cyclists and runners on the Hudson River Park's bike path in Lower Manhattan, New York City. The attack killed eight people, six of whom were foreign tourists, and injured eleven others. After crashing the truck into a school bus, Saipov exited, apparently wielding two guns (later found to be a paintball gun and a pellet gun). He was shot in the abdomen by a policeman and arrested. A flag and a document indicating allegiance to the terrorist group Islamic State of Iraq and the Levant (ISIL) were found in the truck.
December 11, 2017	Attempted suicide attack	Akayed Ullah	Islamic terrorism	0	4	Akayed Ullah—a Bangladeshi electrician living in Brooklyn—attempted a suicide bombing in a passageway between the Times Square–42nd Street and 42nd Street–Port Authority Bus Terminal stations, armed with wires, a pipe bomb, and 9-volt battery. The improvised weapon malfunctioned; Ullah was seriously injured himself and four people were wounded. In 2018, he was convicted in federal court of six offenses, including using a weapon of mass destruction and bombing a public transportation system. Ullah had become radicalized by consuming ISIL propaganda.
April 12, 2022	Mass shooting	Frank Robert James	Black supremacy	0	29	On the morning of April 12, 2022, Frank Robert James is accused of committed a mass shooting on a northbound N train on the New York City Subway in Sunset Park, Brooklyn, New York, United States. The attacker allegedly put on a gas mask, threw two smoke grenades onto the floor of a train car, and opened fire with a Glock 17 9 mm handgun as the train approached the 36th Street station. On January 3, 2023, James entered a guilty plea to 10 counts of committing a terrorist attack, and one count of discharging a firearm
