= 2002 Los Angeles International Airport shooting =

Terrorist attack at the airline ticket counter of Israel's El Al

Coordinates: 33.942°N 118.414°W

- Los Angeles International Airport (California) Los Angeles International Airport (the United States)
- Location: Los Angeles International Airport, California, U.S.
- Date: July 4, 2002; 24 years ago 11:30 a.m. (PDT; UTC-7)
- Target: Passengers and employees of Israeli airline El Al
- Attack type: Mass shooting, terrorism
- Weapons: Glock 21 .45 caliber semi-automatic pistol; Glock 9mm semi-automatic pistol; Knife
- Deaths: 3 (including the perpetrator)
- Injuries: 5 (4 from gunfire)
- Perpetrator: Hesham Mohamed Hadayet
- Motive: Anger towards American support for Israel, Jihadism

On July 4, 2002, a mass shooting occurred at Los Angeles International Airport in Los Angeles, California, United States. In the attack, 41-year-old Hesham Mohamed Hadayet killed two people and wounded four at the ticket counter of El Al, Israel's national airline, before being fatally shot by an El Al security guard.

== Attack ==
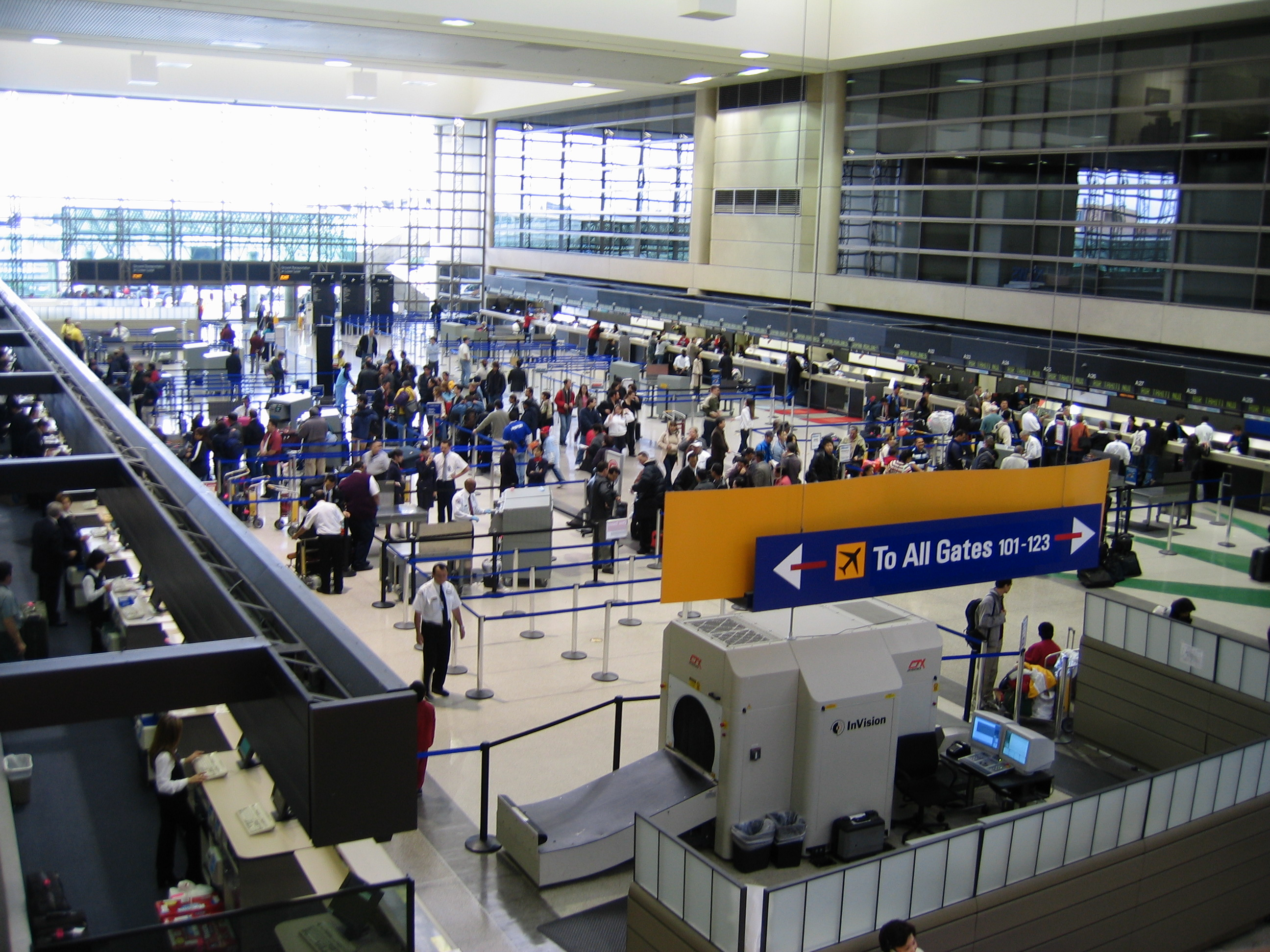
Check-in counters at the LAX terminal, where the incident happened

On July 4, 2002, at around 11:30 a.m., Hadayet approached the El Al ticket counter inside the Tom Bradley International Terminal at the Los Angeles International Airport, pulled out two Glock pistols and started shooting at the 90 passengers standing in the line. Initially, Hadayet killed 25-year-old Customer Service Agent Victoria Hen, standing behind the counter, with a gunshot to the chest. Hadayet opened fire at the passengers as they huddled nearby and killed 46-year-old bystander Yaakov Aminov with a shot to the abdomen. In addition, he injured four other bystanders.

The gunman used a .45 caliber handgun in the shooting. In addition, he had a 9mm handgun, a 6-inch knife and additional loaded magazines for both guns.

After the gunman fired ten bullets at the crowd, one of El Al's security guards, who was unarmed, managed to knock him down. Meanwhile, El Al's security officer, Chaim Sapir, ran to the scene but was stabbed by the assailant with a knife. Despite this, Sapir managed to draw his pistol and shoot the gunman in the chest, killing him.

== Perpetrator ==
Hesham Mohamed Hadayet (July 4, 1961 – July 4, 2002), a 41-year-old Egyptian national, was identified as the assailant. He emigrated to the United States in 1992, arriving on a tourist visa but applied for political asylum. The Immigration and Naturalization Service denied his asylum request in 1995, but the Post Office returned a letter notifying him as undeliverable. No further efforts appear to have been made to locate and deport him. Shortly before his scheduled 1997 deportation, his wife won the Diversity Immigrant Visa lottery, enabling both to become legal residents.

In Egypt, he had been arrested for being a member of Al-Jama'a al-Islamiyya, an Islamist group. He denied the accusation to U.S. immigration authorities. He said he was a member of Asad ibn al-Furat Mosque Association, a group that aimed to "understand truly and apply Islamic law in the 20th century under any circumstances."

Hadayet had a green card (through the Diversity Visa Lottery), which allowed him to work as a limousine driver and to apply for United States citizenship after five years. He was married and had at least one child. At the time of the shooting, Hadayet was living in Irvine, California. He committed the shooting on his 41st birthday.

== Aftermath ==
In September 2002, federal investigators concluded that Hadayet hoped to influence U.S. government policy in favor of the Palestinians and that the incident was a terrorist act, although he didn't seem to be connected to any terrorist organisation. They also inferred that he had been further influenced by the fact that his limousine business was failing, his marriage was going badly, and he felt lonely after his wife and children had left for Egypt.

== See also ==
- 1996 Timika shooting
- 1985 Rome and Vienna airport attacks
- 2013 Los Angeles International Airport shooting
- Fort Lauderdale airport shooting
- List of attacks on Jewish institutions in the United States
- List of homicides in California
