= 2017 New York City Subway bombing =

Terrorist attack on the New York City Subway

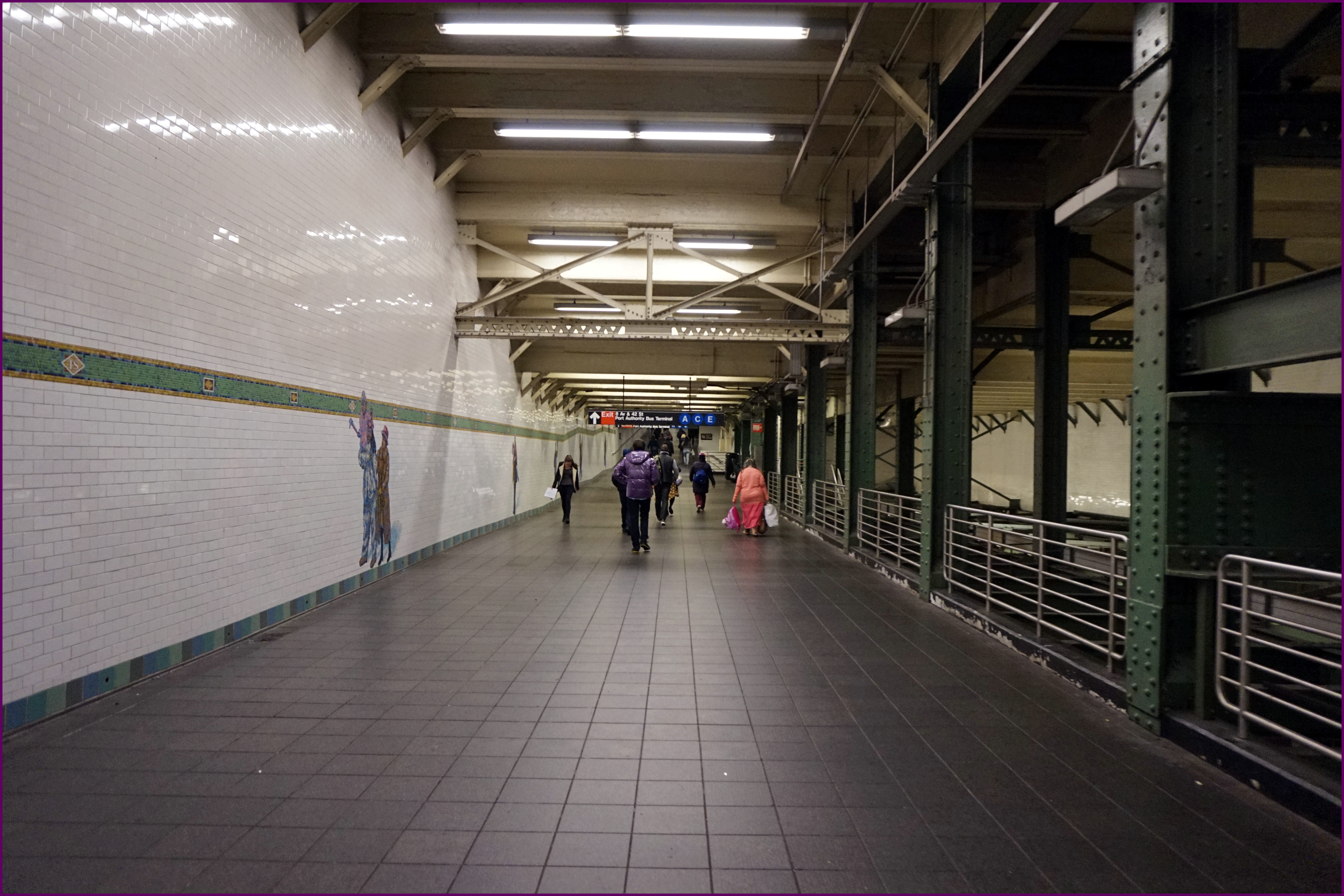
- The passageway near where the bomb detonated, pictured in 2014
- Location: 40.75634°N 73.98983°W; Corridor between the Times Square–42nd Street and 42nd Street–Port Authority Bus Terminal stations, New York City, United States
- Date: December 11, 2017
- Attack type: Attempted suicide bombing, Terrorism
- Deaths: 0
- Injuries: 4 (including the perpetrator)
- Perpetrator: Akayed Ullah
- Motive: Support for the Islamic State, Islamic extremism; Reaction to Gaza-Israel conflict
- Verdict: Life imprisonment without the possibility of parole
- Convictions: Possessing a criminal weapon Making terrorist threats

On December 11, 2017, a pipe bomb partially detonated in a corridor between the Times Square–42nd Street and 42nd Street–Port Authority Bus Terminal subway stations adjoining the Port Authority Bus Terminal in Midtown Manhattan, New York City, United States, injuring four people including the bomber. Mayor Bill de Blasio described the incident as "an attempted terrorist attack". The bomber, 27-year-old Bangladeshi national Akayed Ullah, was convicted in 2018 and sentenced to life in prison in 2021.

== Bombing ==
At approximately 7:20 a.m., during morning rush hour, a pipe bomb partially detonated in an underground corridor connecting the New York City Subway's Times Square–42nd Street and 42nd Street–Port Authority Bus Terminal stations, between the Seventh and Eighth Avenue subway lines. There were four non-life-threatening injuries.

The suspected bomber was taken to Bellevue Hospital for treatment. According to the city's fire department commissioner, the suspect suffered burns to his hands and torso while three bystanders had "ringing ears and headaches". The bombing severely disrupted subway service for several hours, leading to lower-than-normal ridership that day.

== Perpetrator ==
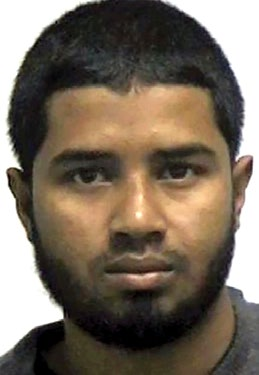
Akayed Ullah

After the incident, the Port Authority Police Department (PAPD) arrested a "would-be suicide bomber" armed with a pipe bomb (which was filled with sugar and Christmas tree lights) and a battery pack. The suspect was identified as 27-year-old Brooklyn resident Akayed Ullah (born March 25, 1990).

Ullah is a permanent U.S. resident. His uncle won a diversity visa lottery which enabled him to bring Ullah to the United States under the family reunification provisions of the Immigration and Nationality Act of 1965. He was a licensed cab driver from March 2012 to March 2015.

One year after he arrived in the U.S., his father died. He subsequently converted to Salafism and pressured his family to pray regularly and adopt conservative religious beliefs. Ullah's wife and child live in Bangladesh, where he kept books by Muhammad Jasimuddin Rahmani, the spiritual leader of extremist group Ansarullah Bangla Team which is linked to the terror group al-Qaeda in the Indian Subcontinent. Ullah had at times frequented the Masjid Nur Al Islam, a mosque in Kensington, Brooklyn, which was placed on the NYPD Intelligence Division's "Mosques of Interest" list in 2004. Four members of the mosque are also on the NYPD's "Most Dangerous" list. He wrote handwritten notes on his passport, including "O AMERICA, DIE IN YOUR RAGE." He had posted a warning on Facebook, "Trump you failed to protect your nation", before the attack. Prosecutors allege he told police after the blast "I did it for the Islamic State."

After being questioned, Ullah reportedly said he was "following ISIS on the internet and reading Inspire magazine". Through online instructions, he learned how to make the explosive device. A law enforcement source told CNN that Ullah said he carried out the attack in response to recent Israeli actions in Gaza over Donald Trump's recognition of Jerusalem as Israel's capital.

The Associated Press, however, reported law enforcement sources told them he was retaliating against U.S. military aggression. Authorities believed he also sought reprisal for American air attacks on Muslims in Syria and elsewhere. According to statements by law enforcement officials, reported in The New York Times, he chose the Times Square area because of its Christmas-themed advertising. During court proceedings, Ullah denied being an ISIS sympathizer, saying he "was angry with Donald Trump because he said he will bomb the Middle East and protect his nation".

== Legal proceedings ==
He was charged with possessing a criminal weapon, making terrorist threats and supporting an act of terrorism. On November 6, 2018, he was found guilty on all counts. He was scheduled to be sentenced on April 5, 2019. His sentencing was delayed to April 22, 2021, when he was sentenced to life imprisonment plus 30 years. He is currently imprisoned at ADX Florence.

== Reaction ==
President Donald Trump said, "There have now been two terrorist attacks in New York City in recent weeks carried out by foreign nationals here on green cards. The first attacker came through the visa lottery, the second came through chain migration. We’re going to end both of them." He called for the end of the Diversity Immigrant Visa and chain migration after this attack, and had made a similar statement following the October 31, 2017, truck attack in Lower Manhattan.

The Bangladeshi consulate in New York City condemned the attack and reiterated the Bangladeshi government policy of zero tolerance against terrorism. Bangladeshi-Americans in New York City denounced the attack, as well as President Trump's suggestion to end chain migration. Bangladesh's Counterterrorism Police stated that they did not find a link between Ullah and domestic terrorist groups in Bangladesh. The counterterrorism police also said that they had placed his family members under surveillance after the attack.

== See also ==
- List of terrorist incidents in December 2017
- List of terrorist incidents in New York City
