= 2017 New York City truck attack =

Attack in Manhattan, New York, US

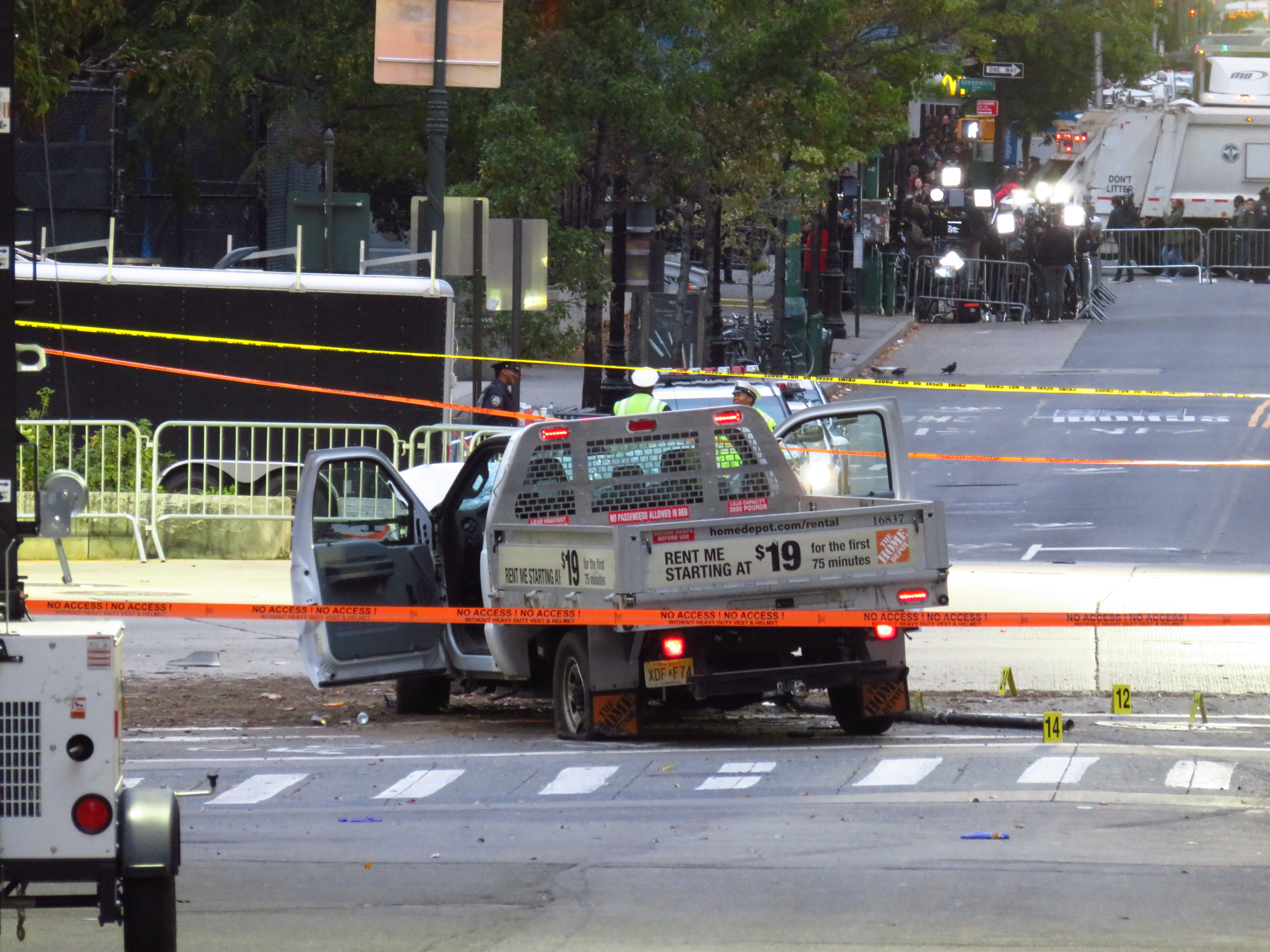
- Rental truck used in the attack, seen the morning after
- Location: 40.7173°N 74.0131°W; Along West Street in Manhattan, New York, U.S.
- Date: October 31, 2017; 9 years ago 3:05 p.m. – 3:10 p.m. (EDT)
- Target: Bicyclists and pedestrians
- Attack type: Vehicle-ramming attack, mass murder, terrorism
- Weapon: Ford Super Duty pickup truck
- Deaths: 8
- Injuries: 14 (including the perpetrator)
- Perpetrator: Sayfullo Habibullaevic Saipov
- Motive: Islamist terrorism inspired by ISIL

On October 31, 2017, Sayfullo Habibullaevic Saipov drove a rented pickup truck into cyclists and runners for about one mile (1.6 kilometers) of the Hudson River Park's bike path alongside West Street from Houston Street south to Chambers Street in Lower Manhattan, New York City. The vehicle-ramming attack killed eight people, six of whom were foreign tourists, and injured thirteen others.

After crashing the truck into a school bus, Saipov exited, apparently wielding two guns (later found to be a paintball gun and a pellet gun). He was shot in the abdomen by a policeman and arrested. A Black Standard and a document indicating allegiance to the terrorist group Islamic State of Iraq and the Levant (ISIL) were found in the truck.

A federal grand jury indicted 29-year-old Saipov, who had immigrated to the United States from Uzbekistan in 2010, with eight murders in the aid of racketeering, twelve attempted murders in the aid of racketeering, destruction of a motor vehicle and providing material support for a terrorist organization. Following the 2002 Los Angeles International Airport shooting, this was the second terrorist attack by a person who participated in the Diversity Immigrant Visa program. After the attack, anti-vehicle bollards were installed on the Hudson River Park bike path. Saipov was convicted and sentenced to life imprisonment in 2023.

== Attack ==
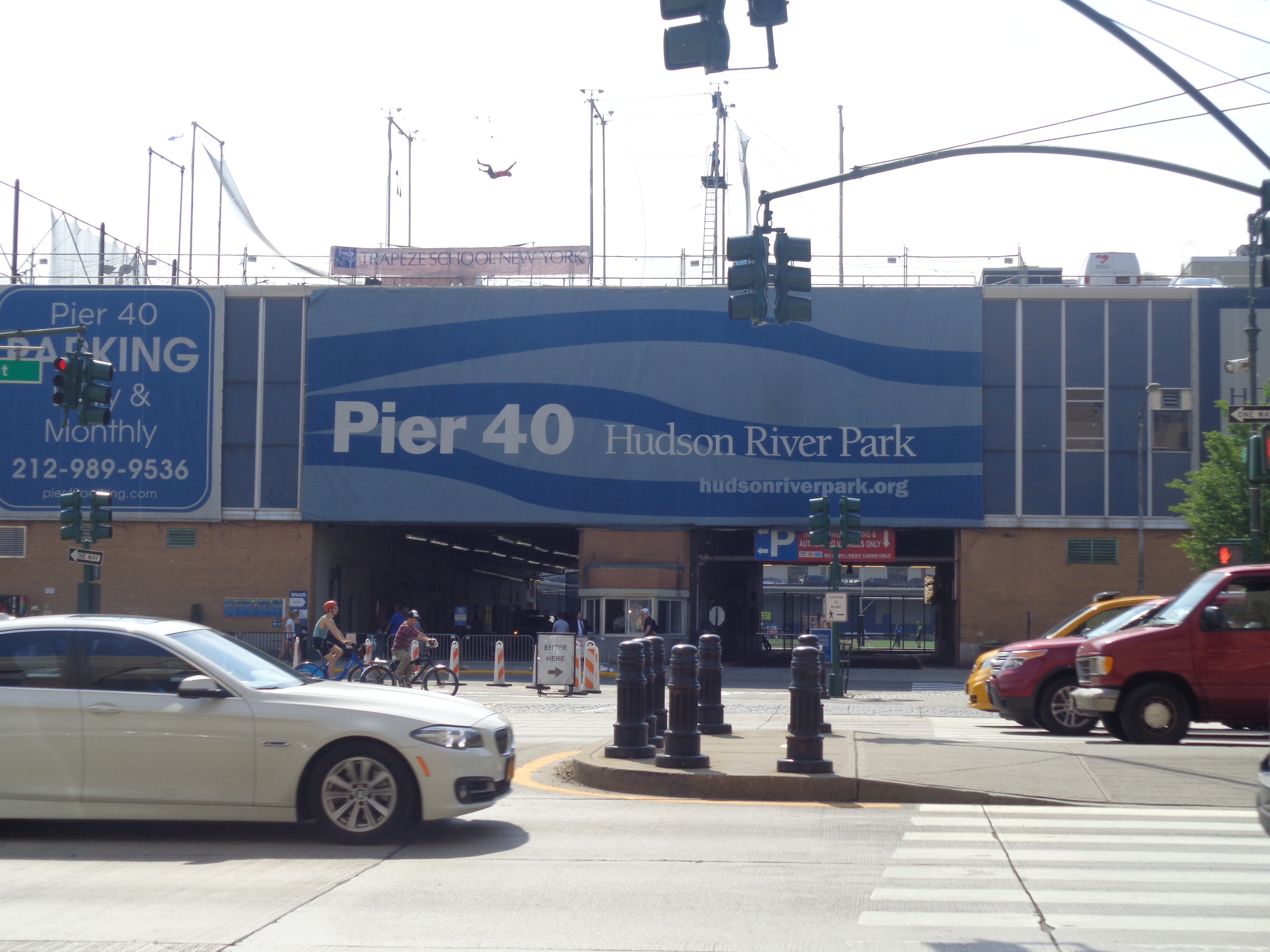
Pier 40, where the incident started

At 2:06 p.m. EDT on October 31, 2017, a man rented a pickup truck at a Home Depot in Passaic, New Jersey. At 2:43 p.m., he crossed the George Washington Bridge and entered Manhattan, proceeding south down the West Side Highway. At 3:04 p.m. at Houston Street near Pier 40, he swerved right into the Hudson River Greenway, a protected bike lane of Hudson River Park that runs parallel to West Street. As Saipov drove onto the bike lane, his truck was driving approx. 31 mph. Just moments after driving onto the bike path, he fatally struck a female Belgian tourist who was biking with her mother and sister. He then struck three out of four members of a different Belgian family who were biking just ahead of the first family. The three family members struck would survive, though the mother would later undergo a double amputation of her legs due to injuries resulting from the collision.

He encountered another female bicyclist but barely missed her. He subsequently struck another female bicyclist and left her severely injured. The next set of victims were 10 Argentinian tourists bicycling down the lane in two columns of five cyclists each. Saipov struck all 10 people, killing all five cyclists in the left column and injuring the five cyclists in the right column. He then sideswiped a female bicyclist who was cycling northward. She witnessed the Argentinian tourists being struck and tried to get out of the path of the truck, but nonetheless suffered a broken foot and several other minor injuries. At this point, Saipov accelerated to a speed of 57 mph. His next victim was a man from New Jersey who was riding a Citi bike during his work break and was fatally run over. Just after killing the man from New Jersey, Saipov swerved and struck a male teacher from Stuyvesant High School who was about to enter the lane on a Citi bike. He was thrown into the air and suffered minor injuries. Just ahead of the teacher, Saipov fatally struck a final bicyclist, whose body was violently thrown into the air. In total, Saipov killed eight people and wounded 11 other cyclists on the aforementioned one mile (1.6 km) portion of the trail.

Saipov accelerated to a speed of 66 mph. He tried swerving left to return to the main road. In the process, he drove onto the median, spreading dirt everywhere, hit a sign, knocked over a traffic light, then crashed into a school bus that was transporting students with special needs. Two out of the four people on the bus were injured. The truck stopped near the corner of Chambers Street and West Street, close to Stuyvesant High School. The driver tried retrieving his three knives only for them to be out of reach for him after the crash. He exited the truck and ran, zigzagging, while brandishing weapons that were later found to be a paintball gun and a pellet gun. Police said he shouted "Allahu Akbar" as he stepped out of the vehicle. He was shot in the abdomen by New York City Police Department officer Ryan Nash, taken into custody, and transported to Bellevue Hospital for medical care.

It was the fifteenth vehicular attack in North America and Europe by jihadist terrorists since 2014, according to New America, a nonpartisan research institution. To date, these attacks had killed a total of 142 people. The incident was considered the deadliest terrorist attack in New York City since the September 11 attacks of 2001, which occurred blocks away from the location of the One World Trade Center and National September 11 Memorial & Museum.

== Victims ==
Eight people were killed in the attack, which injured another twelve, including the suspect and two children. Two of the dead were Americans: Darren Drake, a 32-year-old man from New Milford, New Jersey, and Nicholas Cleves, a 23-year-old man from Manhattan. The other six were foreign nationals; five tourists were from Argentina, and the sixth was from Belgium. The five Argentine victims (Diego Enrique Angelini, Ariel Erlij, Hernan Ferruchi, Hernan Diego Mendoza and Alejandro Damian Pagnucco) were all aged 47 or 48. They had been part of a group of 10 former classmates at San Martín Polytechnic, a high school in the city of Rosario, Argentina, celebrating their 30th graduation anniversary to fulfill a promise made to one another when they graduated. The Belgian victim was Ann-Laure Decadt, a 31-year-old mother of two from Staden on vacation in New York City.

A sixth member of the Argentine group was hospitalized at NewYork–Presbyterian Hospital. Two other Belgians were in critical condition. One surviving victim required the amputation of two limbs.

== Perpetrator ==
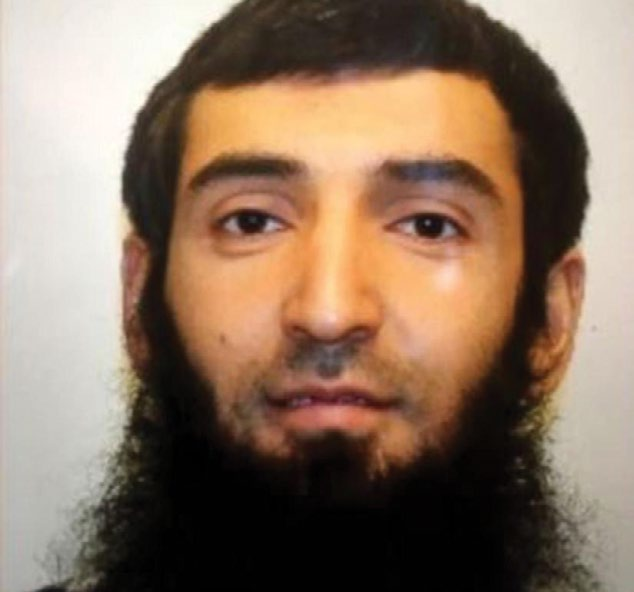
Sayfullo Habibullaevic Saipov

The perpetrator, 29-year-old Sayfullo Habibullaevic Saipov, was born in Tashkent, Uzbekistan, then a part of the Soviet Union, on February 8, 1988, and lived most of his life in the districts of Beltepa and Uchtepa. Saipov was the eldest of four children and his parents' only son. In 2005, he graduated from a professional college and studied at the Tashkent Financial Institute from 2005 to 2009, before working as an accountant.

Saipov entered the United States under a Diversity Immigrant Visa in 2010 and is a permanent resident in the U.S. He resided in Stow, Ohio, before moving to Tampa, Florida, and then Paterson, New Jersey. He worked in New Jersey as an Uber driver for six months. Public records show he held a commercial truck license. Acquaintances said Saipov had a bad temper that cost him driving jobs. He was issued traffic citations in Maryland in 2011, in Pennsylvania in 2012 and 2015 and in Missouri in 2016, where records showed he was driving a tractor-trailer. In 2015, federal agents interviewed Saipov about his contacts with two suspected terrorists, but a case was not opened against him.

An acquaintance of Saipov since 2010 described him as a "little aggressive", and not very religious when he arrived in the U.S. A friend in Ohio said he was prone to getting into fights and misunderstandings. An imam at the mosque Saipov attended in Tampa said Saipov was devoted to outward observances of Islam and was very critical of American policies regarding Israel. In Paterson, Saipov lived behind and regularly prayed at a local mosque, Masjid Omar (which had been a subject of surveillance by an NYPD dragnet surveillance program on Muslims), during the three months preceding the attack.

One of Saipov's sisters in Uzbekistan, who was in regular contact with him, said he had recently expressed a desire to return to his home country, but that he never had any grievances against the U.S. She also said their mother visited Saipov twice, with the second visit occurring earlier that year, and never noticed any signs of radicalization from him.

=== ISIL influence ===
Early reports suggested Saipov was "self-radicalized". John Miller, the deputy commissioner of the New York Police Department, said Saipov carried out his attack in the name of Islamic State of Iraq and the Levant (ISIL), a jihadist militant group fighting in the Iraqi and Syrian civil wars, and appeared to have followed "almost exactly to a T" the group's advice on social media on how to carry out vehicular attacks. The ISIL flag and a document indicating allegiance to ISIL were found in the truck. White House Press Secretary Sarah Huckabee Sanders said the Trump administration considers him an "enemy combatant."

While in custody, Saipov waived his Miranda rights and told police he deliberately chose Halloween to commit the attack and had made a test drive near the route, renting a truck on October 22 for that purpose. According to a criminal complaint, he thought there would be more civilians on the street then, and had been planning the attack for about a year. He also planned on continuing his attack on the Brooklyn Bridge. The complaint stated that he was particularly motivated by a video of Abu Bakr al-Baghdadi questioning the American Muslim response to Muslims killed in Iraq. Investigators found other ISIL images and videos on his electronic devices. He requested to display the ISIL flag in his hospital room and, according to the complaint, "stated that he felt good about what he had done."

== Legal proceedings ==
On November 1, 2017, federal prosecutors charged Saipov with providing material support for terrorism that has caused at least one death. He did not enter a plea during his appearance in federal court. The charges were supplemented on November 21 to include eight counts of murder in aid of racketeering, twelve counts of attempted murder in aid of racketeering, one count of providing material support for terrorism, and one count of violence and destruction of a motor vehicle resulting in death. On November 28 he pleaded not guilty to all charges of murder and terrorism. On January 17, 2018, in a letter to Judge Vernon Broderick, the defense said Saipov would plead guilty to all counts and serve life in prison if the death penalty option was made unavailable. Broderick later scheduled Saipov's trial for October 7, 2019.

Jury selection began in October 2022, and Saipov was found guilty on all murder charges on January 26, 2023. On February 14, 2023, the sentencing phase began for Saipov, with the prosecution seeking the death penalty in his case. The jury was unable to agree on the death penalty for any of the charges against Saipov. Saipov was sentenced to eight consecutive life without parole terms plus two concurrent life terms plus 260 years on May 17, 2023. He is currently incarcerated at ADX Florence.

== Aftermath ==
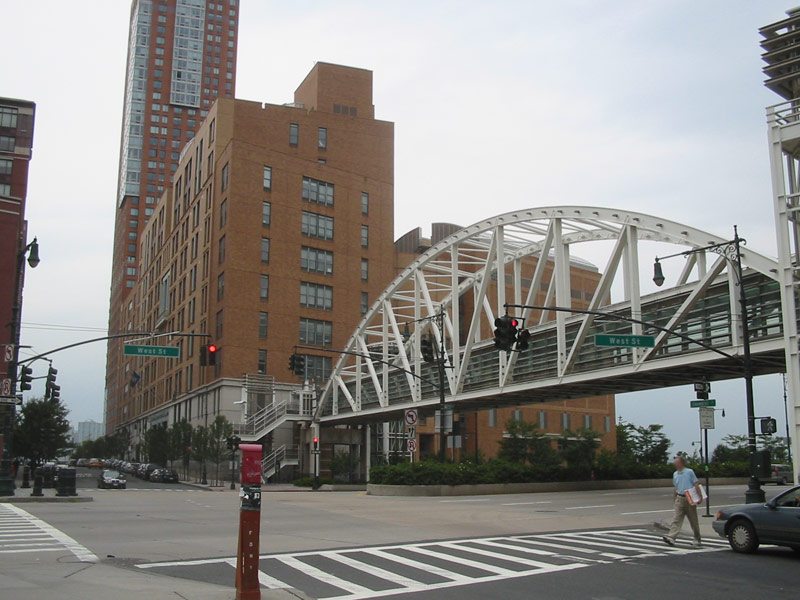
The intersection of Chambers and West Streets, where the attack ended. Stuyvesant High School, at left, was placed on lockdown after reports of gunshots.

Stuyvesant High School, PS 89 Liberty School, and IS 289 Hudson River Middle School were placed in lockdown after reports that shots were heard nearby, for up to three hours following the incident. Several nearby streets were closed to the public, including West, Chambers and Murray Streets, to conduct an investigation, causing traffic jams throughout lower Manhattan. Vehicle and pedestrian activity resumed when the truck was towed the day after the attack.

President Donald Trump ordered the Department of Homeland Security to "step up" its "Extreme Vetting Program". On Twitter, he called for Saipov to be executed, and initially stated that he wanted Saipov to be detained at the Guantanamo Bay detention camp. This prompted pleas from Saipov's sister to not execute him immediately and to give him "time" and a "fair trial". Trump later retracted the latter statement and said Saipov would be tried in New York criminal court instead. New York City Mayor Bill de Blasio called the attack a "particularly cowardly act of terror". New York State Governor Andrew Cuomo said, "New York is an international symbol of freedom and democracy. We are proud of it, that also makes us a target." He also directed One World Trade Center's spire to be lit up in red, white, and blue, the colors of the American flag, to memorialize the victims of the attacks.

This was the second terrorist attack allegedly committed by a winner of the Diversity Immigrant Visa lottery, following the 2002 Los Angeles International Airport shooting committed by Hesham Mohamed Hadayet, an Egyptian. Trump called for the termination of the Diversity Immigrant Visa lottery program. He then ordered the Department of Homeland Security to "step up" the DHS's vetting policy. He cast blame on Chuck Schumer, a Democratic Party senator representing New York, sarcastically calling the lottery scheme "a Chuck Schumer beauty". The program was part of an immigration bill that passed both chambers of Congress with bipartisan support, followed by Republican President George H. W. Bush signing the bill into law in 1990. Schumer introduced a House Bill that helped to create the program. Schumer responded to Trump's attack, saying, "I guess it's not too soon to politicize a tragedy." He also accused Trump of dividing the country and of wanting to cut anti-terrorism funding in budget proposals. Republican Senator Jeff Flake of Arizona defended Schumer, saying the proposals of the bipartisan Gang of Eight, including him and Schumer, would have eliminated the Diversity Visa Lottery.

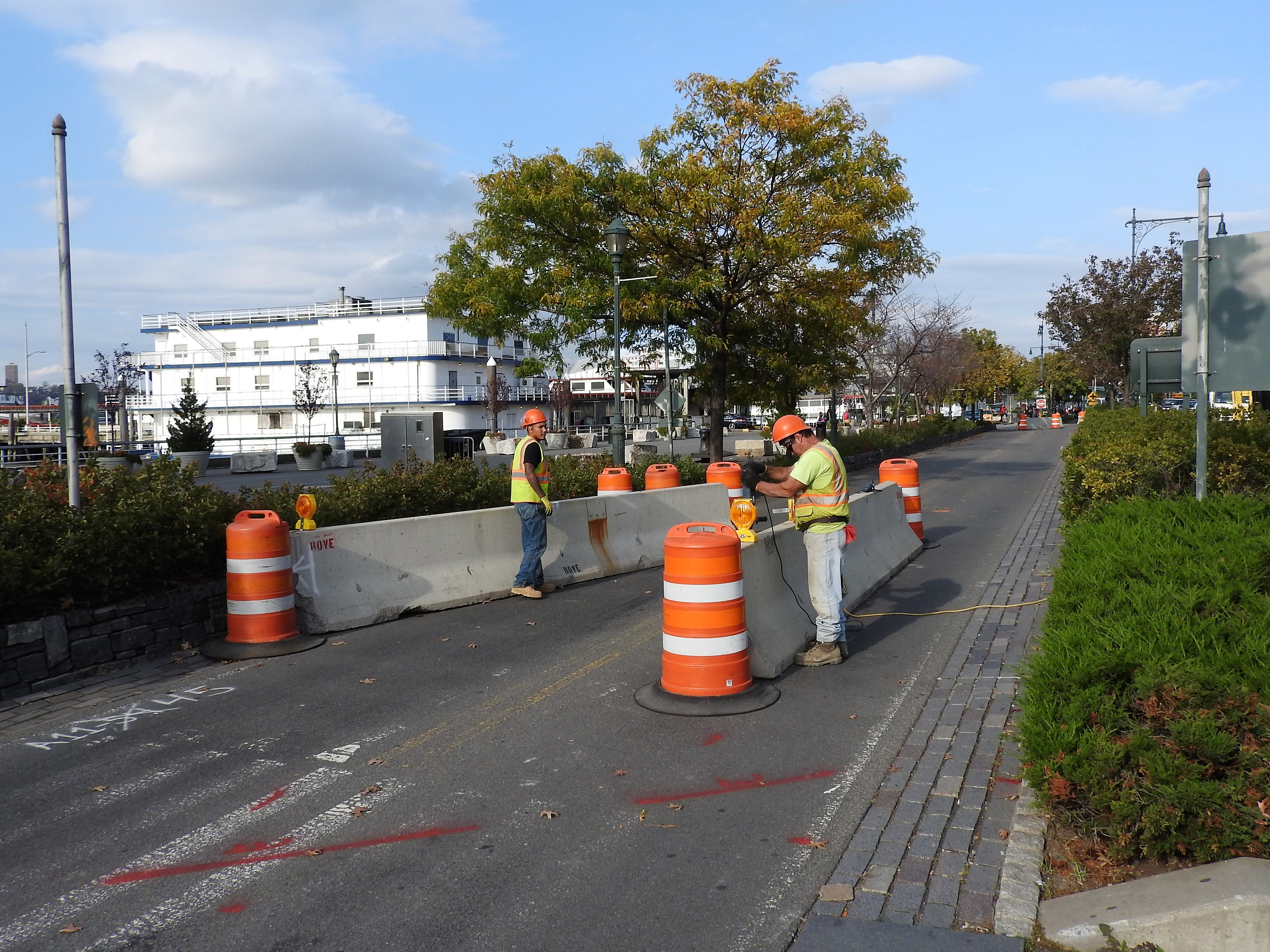
Temporary barrier installation in Midtown

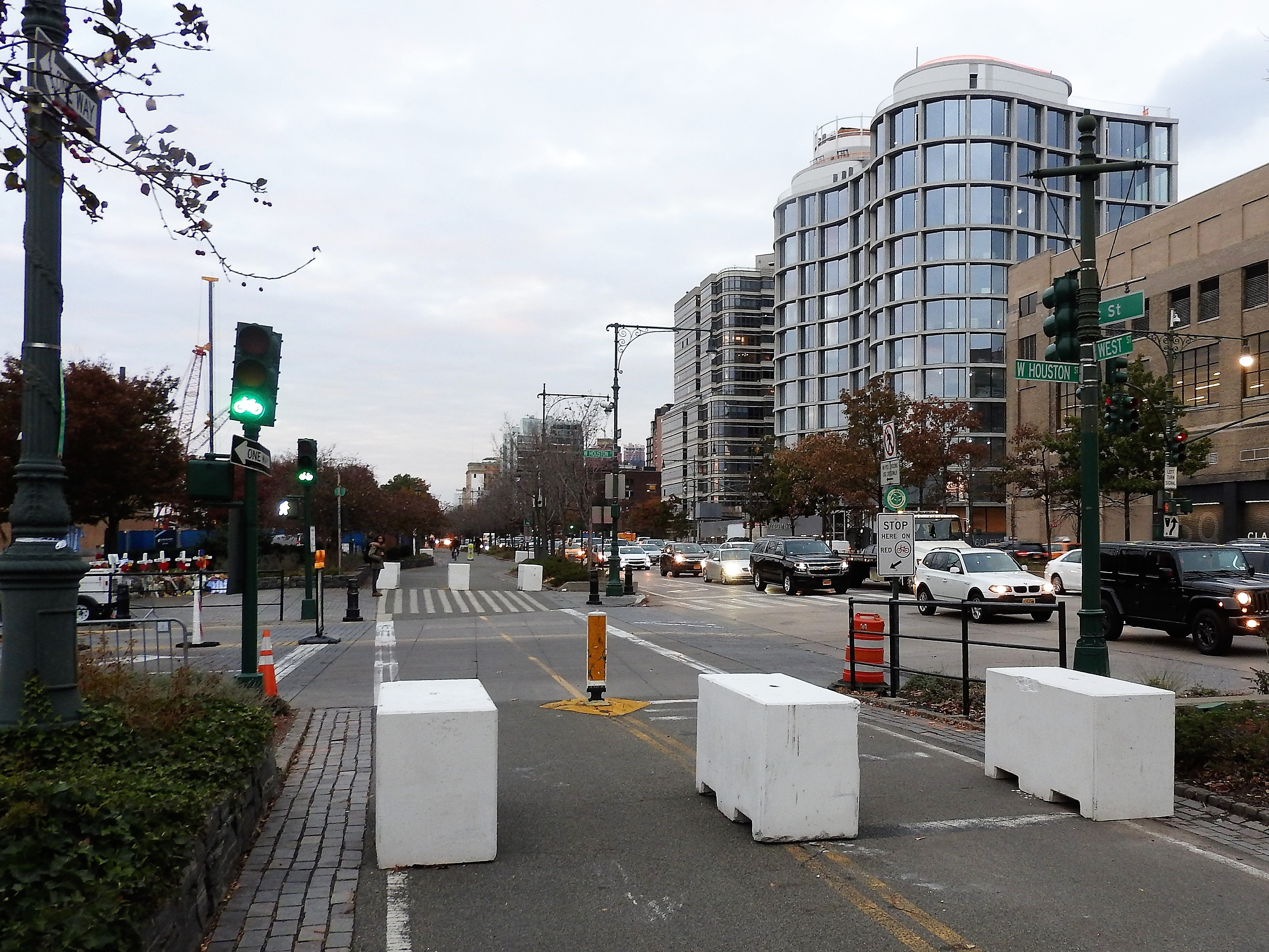
Later installation at Houston Street

After the attack, several media sources wrote about how easy it was to drive down Hudson River Park's bike lane, either by accident or on purpose. Transportation Alternatives had pushed for safety bollards ever since two vehicular incidents resulting in fatalities had occurred on the bike path in 2006, but the city ignored safety concerns and made only aesthetic fixes to the path. City and state officials also started working on a way to improve the bike lane's safety measures, and two days after the attack, the city started placing temporary concrete barriers on the path. The temporary barriers were installed by November 3 and were replaced with permanent barriers in 2019.

ISIL accepted responsibility for the attack in issue #104 of its newsletter, al-Naba, and called Saipov a "soldier of the Caliphate" who responded to its call to attack "citizens of the Crusader countries involved in the alliance against the Islamic State."

Less than four hours after the incident, the massive New York's Village Halloween Parade, which started six blocks east of the incident at Sixth Avenue, proceeded as scheduled. Both Mayor De Blasio and Governor Cuomo marched in the parade.

On November 6, a week after the attack, Argentine President Mauricio Macri and his wife Juliana Awada placed flowers at the Chambers Street site and met with Argentine survivors of the attack.

== See also ==
- 2017 in the United States
- List of terrorist incidents in 2017
- List of terrorist incidents in New York City
