= Stella Tremblay =

American politician

Stella Tremblay is an American former legislator. She represented Rockingham County from Auburn in the New Hampshire House of Representatives.

Tremblay was born in Italy and is a Mormon. She was first elected to the state legislature in 2010 (representing Rockingham District 3) and reelected in 2012 (representing Rockingham District 4). She resigned in disgrace from the legislature on June 20, 2013, after claiming that the people who had their legs blown off in the April 2013 Boston Marathon bombings were faking their injuries.

== Career ==
She was elected on the New Hampshire Republican Party ticket and served on the Children and Family Law committee.

Tremblay is an ardent proponent of the Thirteenther conspiracy theory, going so far as to co-sponsor legislation in 2013 maintaining that the District of Columbia Organic Act of 1871 unlawfully abrogated the United States Constitution by removing the Titles of Nobility Amendment, a briefly proposed but unratified amendment which would have prevented people with titles of nobility from holding public office; as such, Thirteenthers believe that the Constitution as accepted has been fraudulent since then, and Tremblay's proposed legislation sought to correct this. This claim is frequently used by members of the alt-right to claim that lawyers, through the use of the title esquire, are barred from holding public office.

=== Boston Marathon comments ===
Tremblay has maintained conspiracy theories that the 2013 Boston Marathon bombings were a black operation planned and executed by the Federal government of the United States, suggesting as evidence that the injuries sustained by Jeff Bauman (who lost both his legs in the bombing) appear to have been faked. The New Hampshire Republican Party disavowed and strongly condemned her statements.

On June 19, 2013, she circulated a document to the entire legislature reiterating her claim and adding what she stated was additional supposed evidence. She resigned the next day.
