= Somerville Auxiliary Police Department =

Volunteer police department

The Somerville Auxiliary Police Department was a volunteer police force until it was disbanded in 2018. It operated through the police department of Somerville, Massachusetts. The police chief was Henry Wagner. The department was considered one of the most active volunteer law enforcement organizations in the Commonwealth of Massachusetts and was heavily utilized in functions including cruiser patrols, traffic control, crowd control, motor vehicle accidents, fires, parades, emergency management situations, and mutual aid such as the Boston Marathon.

Somerville resident Sean Collier was a former member of the Somerville Auxiliary Police Department and held the rank of sergeant. Collier was murdered in 2013 while serving as a police officer with the Massachusetts Institute of Technology Police Department.
