= Massachusetts Institute of Technology Police Department =

Police agency

- Logo and patch of the MIT Police Department
- Common name: MIT Police

Agency overview
- Legal personality: Non-governmental: Body corporate

Jurisdictional structure
- Operations jurisdiction: United States
- Legal jurisdiction: MIT property
- General nature: Civilian police
- Specialist jurisdiction: Buildings and lands occupied or explicitly controlled by the educational institution and the institution's personnel, public entering the buildings, immediate precincts

Operational structure
- Police officers and detectives: 64 police officers and detectives
- Civilian employees: 14 civilian employees
- Agency executive: John DiFava, Chief of Police

Website
- police.mit.edu

The Massachusetts Institute of Technology Police Department (MIT Police, formerly MIT Campus Patrol) is the police agency charged with providing law enforcement to the campus of the Massachusetts Institute of Technology. The 168-acre (68.0 ha) campus extends over 1 mile (1.6 km) along the northern bank of the Charles River basin. The MIT Police is a special state police agency authorized by Massachusetts General Law.

== History ==
The Massachusetts Institute of Technology (MIT), established in 1861, is located in Cambridge, Massachusetts. In 1987, MIT had about 65 employees in its police department. In 2018 it employed 64 officers and 14 civilians. This is up from the 51 officers and 3 civilians it had in 2011.

In 1987, MIT appointed Anne P. Glavin as its Chief of Police, making her the first woman in New England to be appointed chief of a professional, armed campus police department at a major university.

In 1994, students famously "hacked" (or pranked) the MIT Police by placing a reconstruction of an MIT Police cruiser on top of the Great Dome.

=== Shooting by Boston Marathon bombing suspects ===
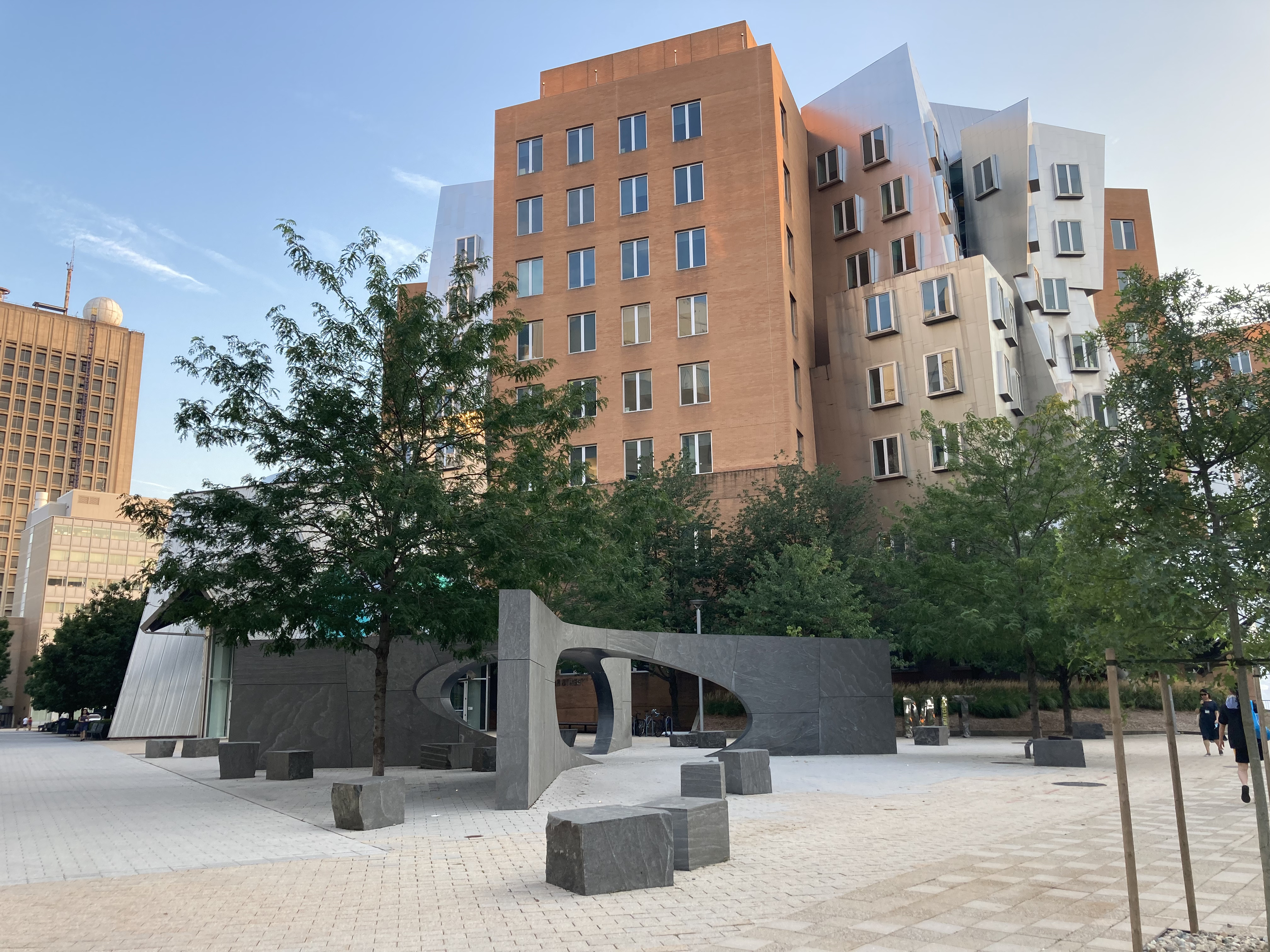
Sean Collier Memorial at MIT

On April 18, 2013, around 10:25 pm, MIT patrol officer Sean Collier, age 27, of Somerville, Massachusetts, was shot in his patrol car while sitting outside MIT's Stata Center. Collier was transported to Massachusetts General Hospital where he was pronounced dead. The Institute advised MIT community members on or near campus to stay indoors. One suspect was later shot and killed; the other was captured the next day. Police investigation suggested that the suspects shot Collier in order to further arm themselves. Some law-enforcement officials said the suspects were seeking to provoke a large-scale confrontation with police. Collier had been a member of the Somerville Auxiliary Police Department from 2006 to 2009.

One week after the shooting, Collier's open-air memorial service was attended by more than 10,000 people—including thousands of police officers from the New England region and Canada—in a ceremony hosted by the MIT community. On November 25, 2013, MIT announced the creation of the Collier Medal, to be awarded annually to "an individual or group that embodies the character and qualities that Officer Collier exhibited as a member of the MIT community and in all aspects of his life". The announcement added that "Future recipients of the award will include those whose contributions exceed the boundaries of their profession, those who have contributed to building bridges across the community, and those who consistently and selflessly perform acts of kindness".

There was a spontaneous, improvised temporary memorial to Collier on the MIT campus; the design for a permanent one at the same site was unveiled at an April 2014 ceremony commemorating the one-year anniversary of the bombings and his murder. At that occasion, Cambridge Mayor David Maher announced that the corner of Vassar Street and Main Street, near where his shooting took place, would be renamed "Officer Sean Collier Square". Representatives from his family and MIT ran in the 2014 Boston Marathon to raise money for a scholarship in his honor. His name has been inscribed in the Cambridge Police Department's memorial to its fallen officers. The permanent memorial is a granite structure resembling an open hand of peace inviting contemplation, designed by MIT Architecture Associate Professor J. Meejin Yoon. The memorial was completed, and a dedication ceremony was held on April 29, 2015.

== Operations ==
The MIT Police focus on a safe academic environment as well as emergency medical service 24 hours a day with or without MIT EMS. MIT Police uses EMT certified officers on cruiser, motorcycle, bicycle, and foot patrols. As of April 2013, John DiFava was the Chief of Police.

Specific offices/services include: Patrol; Crime Prevention Unit; Investigations; Sensitive Crimes Unit; Executive Protection; and Honor Guard.

The MIT Police derive their law enforcement authority as being sworn special state police officers under Massachusetts General Law Chapter 22C Section 63. Additionally, MIT Police Officers hold commissions as deputy sheriffs of Middlesex, Suffolk, and Norfolk Counties, giving them police powers throughout the municipalities where MIT has facilities.

== See also ==
- List of law enforcement agencies in Massachusetts
- Campus police
- Cambridge Police Department (Massachusetts)
- Somerville Auxiliary Police Department
