= Usman Khan (murderer) =

British terrorist (1991–2019)

- عثمان خان
- A 2012 photograph of Khan
- Born: 10 March 1991; Stoke, England, U.K.
- Died: 29 November 2019 (aged 28); London, England, UK
- Cause of death: Gunshot wound
- Other name: Abu Saif
- Education: Haywood High School
- Years active: 2010–2019
- Known for: 2019 London Bridge stabbings
- Allegiance: Al-Muhajiroun

Details
- Killed: 2
- Injured: 3
- Weapon: Kitchen knife

Usman Khan (10 March 1991 – 29 November 2019), also known as Abu Saif, was a British Islamic terrorist who on 29 November 2019, murdered two people near London Bridge before being subdued by civilians and fatally shot by City of London Police.

== Early life ==
Born in Stoke-on-Trent, England, to parents of Pakistani descent, Khan's education included attendance at Haywood High School. A portion of his teenage years was spent in Pakistan, where, prior to his December 2010 arrest, he visited the Federally Administered Tribal Areas, as noted in a 2013 report by the British Parliament's Independent Reviewer of Terrorism Legislation. Khan's involvement with al-Muhajiroun, a militant network based in Saudi Arabia, led to his role as a community organiser, notably arranging a Sharia conference in 2009.

== 2008 anti-terror raids ==
In 2008, following a raid on his Stoke-on-Trent residence by counter-terrorist police, Khan faced scrutiny but denied terrorist affiliations in interviews with the BBC and a local newspaper under a pseudonym. Despite a 20-month inquiry, no charges were filed against him.

== 2010 arrest and 2012 terrorism conviction ==
Upon returning from Pakistan, Usman Khan was arrested in 2010 as part of a group of nine individuals targeted by MI5’s Operation Guava. In 2012, all members of this group pleaded guilty to charges of terrorism inspired by Al-Qaeda. Their plans included bombing significant locations in the UK such as the London Stock Exchange, the Houses of Parliament, the US embassy, two rabbis at two synagogues, the Dean of St Paul's Cathedral, the home of then London Mayor Boris Johnson, as well as proposing to establish a terrorist training camp in land owned by Khan’s family in Pakistan-administered Kashmir. The group also engaged in planning meetings and made preparations for travel related to terrorist activities, with intentions to carry out further attacks in the UK upon returning from the proposed camp in Kashmir.

Khan proposed to raise funds in the UK rather than overseas, arguing that supporters in the UK earned in a day what donors in Kashmir earned in a month. He added: "On Jobseeker's Allowance we can earn that, never mind working for that." While his home was bugged by MI5, he was recorded calling non-Muslims "dogs". Following his arrest, Khan admitted travelling to the plotter's 2010 tactical meetings in Cardiff in November and in Newport in December. Khan's plans to build a terror-training camp in Kashmir never materialised and "there was no evidence that there was any real funding to build it". The group had formed in October. The terror network's organisational chart was found in Khan's home. In addition to confessing to terrorism planning, Khan admitted terrorism fundraising and possession of the Al Qaeda magazine Inspire.

Following his arrest, evidence of Khan’s advanced knowledge in field craft was noted, highlighting his significant role within the group. In 2012, he was sentenced to imprisonment for public protection and an indeterminate period in prison with a minimum term of eight years, reflecting the judge’s assessment of Khan and his associates from Stoke-on-Trent as exceptionally committed jihadists operating at a level of seriousness and effectiveness above that of their co-defendants.

== Rehabilitation and release from prison ==
Khan was originally sentenced to indefinite imprisonment for public safety. This sentence, however, was overturned in 2013 when Khan, alongside Nazam Hussain and Mohammed Shahjahan, appealed. The Court of Appeal, led by Lord Justice Leveson, re-evaluated the perceived threat level of these individuals compared to their co-defendants, resulting in a reduced sentence of 16 years with eligibility for automatic release after eight. Upon completion of this term, Khan was released from Whitemoor prison in December 2018 under standard licence conditions, which included probation supervision. Stafford Borough Council, with support from multiple agencies, arranged suitable housing following his release.

During his imprisonment, Khan engaged in the Healthy Identity Intervention Programme, aimed at rehabilitating terrorism offenders. This participation continued post-release with the Desistance and Disengagement Programme, focusing on tackling terrorism's root causes. Khan's involvement in these programmes led to his recognition as a rehabilitation "success story" by a Cambridge University programme, culminating in a case study feature. Khan later killed two people associated with the programme. After the killings, these events, a paper published in the CTC Sentinel in April 2020 described Khan and another recent terrorism recidivist as atypical examples, noting a recidivism rate of less than 5% among terrorists.

== 2019 attack ==
The terms of Khan's temporary release licence did not allow for travel to London; special permission would have been needed for him to participate in Cambridge University's Learning Together "Five Year Celebration" on the day he carried out the stabbing. Khan sat quietly during the celebration event, attending storytelling and writing workshops; even giving feedback on one. He then stabbed two Learning Together organisers in the chest, killing them, and injured three other people. He was wearing an electronic tag and a fake suicide jacket when he was shot following the stabbing.

== Burial and aftermath ==
Khan's body was taken to a mosque in Birmingham, for a ritual janazah Muslim funerary ceremony. The body was then flown to Islamabad. Khan was buried in Kajlani in Kashmir.

"Usman Khan Call 4 Justice" graffiti in support of Khan appeared on walls in his Stoke hometown after his death.

== Links to terror group ==
Khan had previously been connected to Al-Muhajiroun, the group led by Anjem Choudary. He was said to be inspired by Al-Qaeda. Khan's solicitor Vajahat Sharif claimed that Khan had become disillusioned with Al-Muhajiroun and that during his prison sentence he had repeatedly requested the help of a deradicaliser, to no avail. Sharif said that in 2018 Khan appeared to be rehabilitated, and that he may have been "re-groomed" by extremists after his release.

== Political and social debate ==
In 2012, after being convicted of offences related to a plot to bomb the London Stock Exchange, Khan was sentenced to be kept in prison for an indeterminate time. This meant that he could not be released whilst he was still considered to be a danger to the public. Following an appeal in 2013, his indeterminate sentence was quashed, and in its place he was given a 16-year prison sentence, which meant he would be entitled to automatic release on licence after having served eight years. Questions were also raised about the level of monitoring he was subject to by the authorities responsible after his release. The parole board confirmed that it had no involvement in deciding when Khan was released from prison, saying Khan "appears to have been released automatically on licence" even though he had a "serious long-term plan" and a commitment to terrorism.

Chris Phillips, former head of the UK National Counter Terrorism Security Office, commented the justice system was "playing Russian roulette" with the lives of the public. Phillips commented that the original trial judge "wanted this man in prison for a very very long time", and described Khan's release as "quite incredible". Paul Gibson, former head of counter-terrorism at the UK Ministry of Defence, supported the criticism, commenting on the release: "A lot of people will find that extraordinary."
