= 2019 London Bridge stabbings =

Stabbing attack in London, England

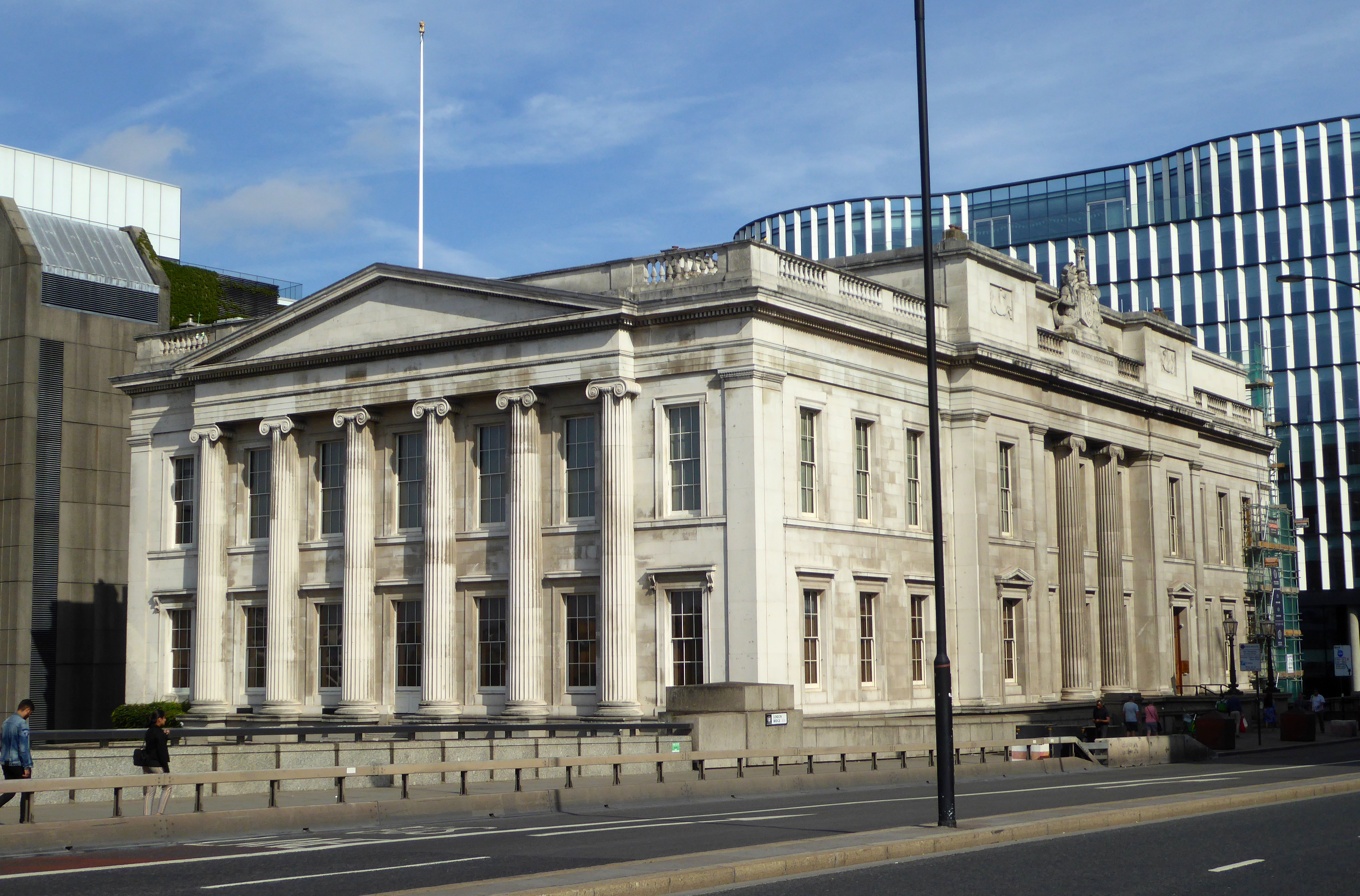
- Fishmongers' Hall, with London Bridge in the foreground. The attacker was shot near the street name plate on the bridge pier.

- Location: 51°30′33″N 0°05′15″W; Fishmongers' Hall and London Bridge, London, United Kingdom
- Date: 29 November 2019
- Target: People at Fishmongers' Hall and on London Bridge
- Attack type: Stabbing
- Weapon: Two knives
- Deaths: 3 (including the perpetrator)
- Injuries: 3
- Assailant: Usman Khan
- Defenders: Łukasz Koczocik; Darryn Frost; John Crilly; Steven Gallant
- Motive: Islamic extremism

On 29 November 2019, five people were stabbed, two of them fatally, in Central London. The attacker, Usman Khan, was fatally shot by City of London Police.

Since Khan was considered a "success story" for a Cambridge University rehabilitation programme, and was featured as a case study by the University, he was attending an offender rehabilitation conference in Fishmongers' Hall. He threatened to detonate what turned out to be a fake suicide vest and started attacking people with two knives taped to his wrists, killing two of the conference participants by stabbing them in the chest. Several people fought back, some attacking Khan with a fire extinguisher, a pike and a narwhal tusk as he fled the building and emerged on to London Bridge, where he was partially disarmed by a plain-clothes police officer. He was restrained by members of the public until additional police officers arrived, pulled away those restraining him, and shot him. Khan died at the scene.

== Background ==
A conference on offender rehabilitation was held on 29 November 2019 in Fishmongers' Hall, at the northern end of London Bridge, in the City of London, to celebrate the fifth anniversary of Learning Together, a programme run by the Cambridge Institute of Criminology to help offenders reintegrate into society following their release from prison. Learning Together was set up in 2014 by University of Cambridge academics Ruth Armstrong and Amy Ludlow from the Faculty of Law and Institute of Criminology to "bring together people in criminal justice and higher education institutions to study alongside each other in inclusive and transformative learning communities" to enable students and prisoners to work together.

Former prisoner Usman Khan had been invited to the conference as a previous participant in the programme, and although banned from entering London under the terms of his release, he was granted a one-day exemption to attend.

== Attack ==
At 13:58 on 29 November, the police were called to Fishmongers' Hall after Khan, wearing a fake suicide vest, threatened to blow up the hall. Holding two kitchen knives taped to his wrists, he began stabbing people inside the building. Several fought back, including a Polish kitchen porter, Łukasz Koczocik, who fought Khan off with an ornamental spear, a South African, Darryn Frost, who grabbed a 1.5-metre-long (4.9 ft) narwhal tusk from the wall to use as a weapon, former prisoner John Crilly, and Steven Gallant, a convicted murderer attending the conference on day release from prison, after participating in the Learning Together programme. Khan fled and began stabbing pedestrians outside on the north side of the bridge.

Several people were injured before members of the public, including a tour guide and a plain-clothes British Transport Police officer, later seen walking away with a knife, restrained and disarmed Khan on the bridge. One of the people who stepped in to fight the attacker drove him back by spraying a fire extinguisher.

Armed officers of the City of London Police arrived at 14:03 and surrounded the attacker, who at the time was being restrained by a Ministry of Justice communications worker attending the rehabilitation meeting. The officers pulled this person away to provide a clear shot, before one fired twice. At 14:10, Khan started to get up; he was then shot 10 further times by six firearms officers. Khan had not been secured after the initial shooting due to the suicide vest. Khan died at the scene.

A Transport for London bus which had stopped adjacent to the site of the shooting was found to have damage to both its front and rear windows, possibly caused, according to the Metropolitan Police, by a ricocheting bullet.

== Victims ==
Three of the victims were associated with Cambridge University's Learning Together prison-rehabilitation programme; two died and one was injured. The two who died from their stab wounds were Jack Merritt and Saskia Jones. Merritt was a 25-year-old law and criminology graduate who had studied at the University of Manchester and Cambridge University. For his master's thesis, he had written about the "overrepresentation of Black, Asian, and minority ethnic males aged 18–21 in the British Prison System." He worked as a University of Cambridge administration officer and was from Cottenham. Jones, 23 years old, was a former Anglia Ruskin University and University of Cambridge student from Stratford-upon-Avon and was the daughter of the journalist Alastair Down. Merritt was a course coordinator for Learning Together. Funeral services for Merritt and Jones were conducted on 20 December 2019.

Two other women were seriously injured, while a chef who was working at the event was stabbed but had less serious injuries.

== Perpetrator ==
The attacker was identified as Usman Khan, a 28-year-old British national from Stoke-on-Trent, of Pakistani descent. Khan appears to have left school with no qualifications after spending part of his late teens in Pakistan. He was known to police and had links to Islamist extremist groups. In December 2018 he had been automatically released from prison on licence, where he was serving a 16-year sentence for terrorism offences, and was wearing an electronic tag.

Khan had been part of a plot, inspired by Al-Qaeda, to establish a terrorist camp on his family's land in Kashmir and bomb the London Stock Exchange. The plot was disrupted by MI5 and the police, as part of MI5's Operation Guava, and Khan was given an indeterminate sentence. Of the nine men involved, Khan was the youngest at 19 and according to Mr Justice Wilkie, Khan and two others were “more serious jihadis” than the others. In 2013, his sentence was revised after an appeal, and he was ordered to serve at least 8 years of his new 16-year sentence, with a 5-year extended licence allowing recall to prison.

According to the anti-extremism group Hope not Hate, Khan was a supporter of Al-Muhajiroun, an extremist group with which scores of terrorists were involved. He was a student and a personal friend of Anjem Choudary, an Islamist and terrorism supporter. Khan had previously participated in the Learning Together programme.

Post-mortem examination showed evidence of "occasional use of cocaine" by Khan.

== Aftermath ==
The news of the attack was broadcast live on the BBC News Channel by one of its reporters, John McManus, who witnessed members of the public fighting Khan as he crossed the bridge, and heard two shots being fired by police officers. McManus said that he was certain that more than two shots were fired during the incident. The police, ambulance, and fire services attended the scene and a major incident was declared. A large police cordon was set up in the area and residents were told to stay away. Police closed both Monument Underground station and London Bridge station after the attack. The police reported that there had been no prior intelligence of the attack.

The Prime Minister, Boris Johnson, returned to Downing Street following the incident, after campaigning in his constituency for the forthcoming general election. Johnson commended the "immense bravery" of the emergency services and members of the public, and claimed that anyone involved in the attack would be "hunted down". The Mayor of London, Sadiq Khan, thanked the emergency services and members of the public who helped to restrain the attacker, saying they had shown "breathtaking heroism". The Conservative Party, Labour Party and Liberal Democrats temporarily suspended campaigning in London for the general election. A parliamentary election hustings event scheduled to be held at Great St Mary's Church in Cambridge on 30 November was cancelled and replaced by a memorial vigil for the victims of the attack.

Metropolitan Police Commissioner Cressida Dick made a statement following the attack describing events. She said there would be an increased police presence on the streets and that cordons in the London Bridge area would remain in place. An appeal was made for the public to submit any film or picture evidence or information that could assist the investigation.

In Pakistan, publication of Khan's Pakistani origins by the leading newspaper Dawn were deemed unpatriotic and defamatory, and led to demonstrations demanding that the publisher and the editor be hanged.

The Islamic State claimed responsibility for the attack. Its news agency, Amaq, claimed Usman Khan was one of its fighters. A janaza (funeral) prayer for Khan was held at a mosque in Birmingham, and he was buried in his family's ancestral village in Pakistan, following objections to his burial in the UK by local Muslims in his native Stoke.

In 2021, following an inquest, Independent Reviewer of Terrorism Legislation Jonathan Hall QC called for those involved in the planning or preparation of terrorist attacks to be given automatic life sentences. Hall stated it was "hard to underestimate how serious Usman Khan's original offence was."

In March 2023, Gallant, Crilly, Frost and Koczocik were awarded the Queen's Gallantry Medal for their actions during the attack.

In recognition of his role, Frost was sculpted by Nick Elphick in a 2026 episode of the BBC television series Extraordinary Portraits.

=== Royal prerogative of mercy ===
In October 2020, Gallant was granted the royal prerogative of mercy by the Queen on the advice of Lord Chancellor Robert Buckland, in order to bring his parole hearing forward by ten months to June 2021. The Ministry of justice said this was "in recognition of his exceptionally brave actions at Fishmongers' Hall, which helped save people's lives despite the tremendous risk to his own". The families of both Merritt and of Gallant's 2005 murder victim approved of the action due to his heroic deeds and efforts to turn his life around since the murder. The Parole Board announced on 6 July that he would be released that day.

== Investigations ==
London Bridge was closed until the early hours of the following Monday for forensic investigation of the scene. Two properties, in Stafford, where Khan lived, and in Stoke-on-Trent, were searched by police.

An inquest into the deaths of Merritt and Jones was opened on 4 December, at the Central Criminal Court in London, and was subsequently adjourned. A pre-inquest review hearing took place at the Old Bailey on 16 October 2020, before the Chief Coroner of England and Wales, Mark Lucraft QC. The Independent Office for Police Conduct opened an investigation into the shooting. In a separate investigation, Staffordshire Police came under IOPC scrutiny.

The inquest reopened on 12 April 2021, presided over by Lucraft. On 28 May 2021, the jury concluded the victims had been unlawfully killed and that insufficient monitoring of Khan, unreasonable belief in his rehabilitation, a lack of information sharing between agencies, and inadequate security planning at the event were all contributing factors in their deaths.

Khan's inquest, also overseen by Lucraft in June 2021, found that he was lawfully killed by the police.

== See also ==
- 2017 London Bridge attack
- List of terrorist incidents in London
- List of terrorist incidents in Great Britain
