= Operation Guava =

Operation Guava (Note: "Codenamed Operation Guava and featuring British radical groups, the Internet, Inspire magazine, training camps in Pakistan, prison radicalisation and a mysterious character known as "the Bengali," this case brings together a number of different strands in British jihadist terrorism") is the code name for a long-term (Note: "A long-term investigation led by British intelligence agency MI5 into a network of cells of British Muslims suspected of plotting acts of terrorism") British Security Service (MI5) operation. The operation tracked a terrorist cell, which planned "a significant terrorist plot." The Operation Guava plotters used the Al-Qaeda in the Arabian Peninsula magazine Inspire as an instruction manual for the bomb they planned to leave in a toilet stall at the London Stock Exchange. (Note: "Code-named Operation Guava, the investigation was part of a long-term effort to disrupt a domestic network [...] Key among their possessions was Inspire magazine") (Note: "plan also included a series of parcel bombs to be constructed based on instructions printed in an Al-Qaeda newsletter") The police code name for the investigation was Operation Norbury.

== Name ==
The book sources and government reports all refer to the case as "Operation Guava". Some contemporaneous (2010–2012) news reports refer to a "Christmas plot" or "London Stock Exchange bombing." Other press reports (2012–2019) use "Operation Guava".

== Plot ==
Aside from bombing the London Stock Exchange, the plotters planned the establishment of a jihadist training camp in Azad Kashmir on land owned by one of the suspects, Usman Khan. The plotters were monitored by covert listening device and found to be engaged in Holocaust denial by claiming that fewer than 100,000 Jews died in the Holocaust. Other targets included: the US Embassy in London, two rabbis each from a separate synagogue, the Dean of St Paul's Cathedral, and Boris Johnson; the plotters had procured their addresses. All the conspirators envisioned returning experienced, together with future recruits, from their Kashmiri training camp to execute terror attacks in the UK.

The conspirators further reconnoitred several additional targets, including Big Ben, the London Eye, and Westminster Abbey.

The terrorist network was composed of individuals from Birmingham, Cardiff, East London, and Stoke-on-Trent. The main focus of the East London group was to attack targets in the UK. The most active was the Stoke group, which had as primary goal to set up the terrorist camp to be disguised as a madrassa, though bombing pubs in Stoke was also discussed. The Stoke cell was described by the prosecution as having "well developed" field craft, and being concerned about being arrested on account of the other groups' naiveté. The Stoke group's sophistication disturbed authorities the most. (Note: "the authorities were much more concerned about the sophistication displayed by the Stoke branch of the gang")

== Convictions ==
The conspirators were arrested in December 2010; all nine network members pled guilty and eight were convicted of engaging in preparation for acts of terrorism.

Three of the nine (Mohammad Shahjahan, Nazam Hussein, and Usman Khan), all from Stoke, were given indefinite prison terms, on account of being considered "more dangerous than the others". Nonetheless, an appellate judge determined that this characterisation was "unfair" and their sentences were reduced to between 16 and 17 years' prison each. Mohammad Shahjahan had previously been featured in a 2010 documentary produced by the BBC about people called Mohammed, on which he was presented as a former Muslims4UK member. Usman Khan later on went on to take part in a Cambridge University rehabilitation programme where he was considered a "poster boy for Britain's anti-radicalisation strategy" and later yet perpetrated the 2019 London Bridge stabbing, (Note: "The poster boy for Britain's anti-radicalisation strategy turned up at the event with a hoax explosive device strapped to his chest") when he killed two people and wounded three more.

The 'lynchpin' of the plot was Mohammed Chowdury, (Note: "a picture has emerged of central plotter Mohammed Chowdury") also spelled Chowdhury. (Note: "The 'lynchpin' of the group was [...] Mohammed Chowdhury [...] He made the most phone calls between the group and organised meetings")

One of the plotters, Shah Rahman, was released from prison on 6 August 2021 but was later re-imprisoned for opening a secret bank account, a violation of his parole. Rahman was again released in 2025.
