= OLR =

OLR or olr may refer to:

- Operator of last resort, a UK business that operates a railway company on behalf of the government
- Outgoing longwave radiation, climate science term
- Forward Operating Base Salerno airport IATA code
- Order for lifelong restriction
- Olrat language
