= 2011 Marrakesh bombing =

Terrorist attack in Marrakesh

- Part of Insurgency in the Maghreb (2002–present)
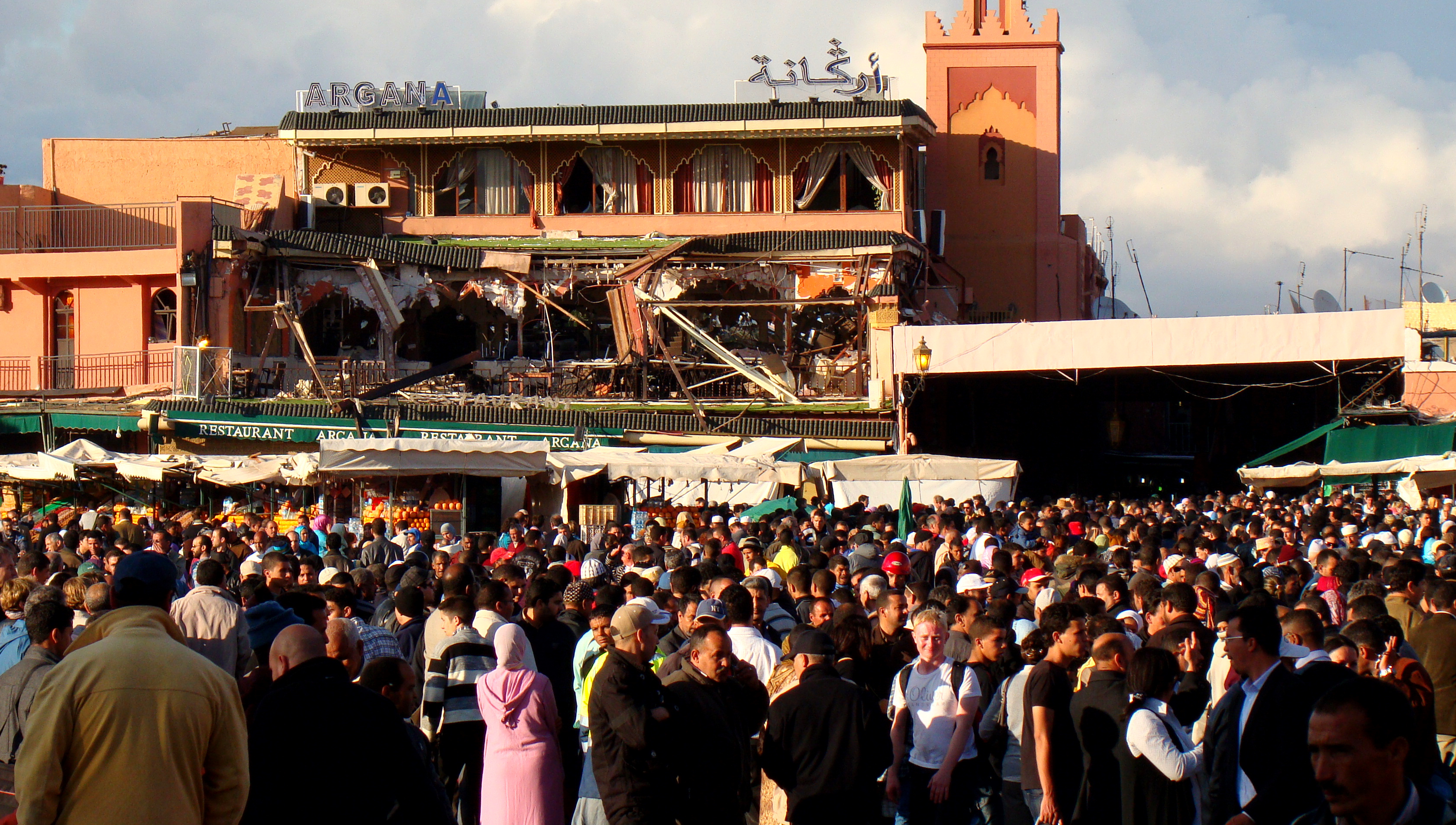
- Djemaa el Fna on the day after the bombing
- Location: 31.6265°N 7.9889°W; Cafe Argana, Jemaa el-Fnaa, Marrakesh, Morocco
- Date: 28 April 2011; 11:50 a.m. (UTC+1)
- Target: Foreign tourists in Morocco
- Attack type: Domestic terrorism, bombing, mass murder
- Weapon: Two remote-detonated TATP pressure cooker nail bombs
- Deaths: 17
- Injuries: 25
- Perpetrators: Al-Qaeda in the Islamic Maghreb (alleged, denied involvement)
- Assailant: Adil El-Atmani
- Motive: French intervention in the Middle East

The 2011 Marrakesh bombing was a domestic terrorist bombing of the Argana Cafe in Jemaa el-Fnaa, Marrakesh, Morocco, on April 28, 2011. A lone terrorist, Adil El-Atmani, planted two homemade pressure cooker bombs hidden inside of a backpack at the cafe and detonated them at 11:50 a.m., killing 17 and injuring 25. Many of the dead were tourists, including a group of French students.

El-Atmani, a 25 year-old shoe salesman, pledged allegiance to al-Qaeda in the Islamic Maghreb, who denied involvement in the attack. He was arrested six days later after a SIM card registered under his name was found in what remained of the bomb. During questioning, he said that he learned bomb-making on the Internet. A letter to the French government found on his laptop ordered the withdrawal of French troops in the Middle East, threatening to "attack targets in the heart of France" if his order was not fulfilled within the twenty days following the attack.

Adil El-Atmani was sentenced to death for the attack by an anti-terrorism court in Salé. He is awaiting execution at Moul El Bergui central prison in Safi. He was put in solitary confinement in 2017 after attempting to kill his cellmate.

== Casualties ==
Seventeen people were killed, of which fourteen died on the site, while three more succumbed to their injuries the next day. Twenty-five people were injured, four seriously, including Russian computer hacker Roman Seleznev, a portion of whose skull was blown off.

The casualties were eight French nationals, including a ten-year-old girl, an Israeli-Canadian woman and her Moroccan husband, another Moroccan citizen, a British man, a Dutchman, two Swiss citizens, a Portuguese and a Canadian.

Among the injured, fourteen were hospitalised and four were repatriated to their country the next day, while others left the hospital after receiving the necessary care.

== Responsibility ==
Morocco blamed al-Qaeda in the Islamic Maghreb for the bombing. The group has been fighting an insurgent campaign since 2002. However, al-Qaeda denied responsibility for the blast.

On 28 October 2011, in court in Rabat, Adel al-Othmani was sentenced to death for his role in the bombing. Hakim Dah received a life sentence. Four others were given four years and three were given a two-year sentence for their roles. The defendants complained that the case against them was based on confessions coerced through torture and lacked hard evidence.

== International reactions ==
Armenia – President Serzh Sargsyan sent his condolences to the King of Morocco and stated his support "in finding the culprits and bringing them to justice".

France issued a strong condemnation of the blasts; French president Nicolas Sarkozy describing them as "cruel and cowardly". Alain Juppé, the French foreign minister, denounced what it considered to be a "barbaric terrorist attack that nothing can justify", calling for "all light to be shed on this revolting crime, for those responsible to be found, tried and punished".

Germany urged that the attack "must not stop the reform process that has been initiated in Morocco", referring to the ongoing "Arab Spring".

US Secretary of State Hillary Clinton said that "the United States condemns in the strongest terms today's terrorist attack that killed and injured innocent people at a cafe in Marrakesh, Morocco. We extend our deepest sympathies to the victims of this cowardly attack and stand with the people of Morocco at this difficult time."
