= 2016 Wrocław attack =

2016 terrorist attack in Poland

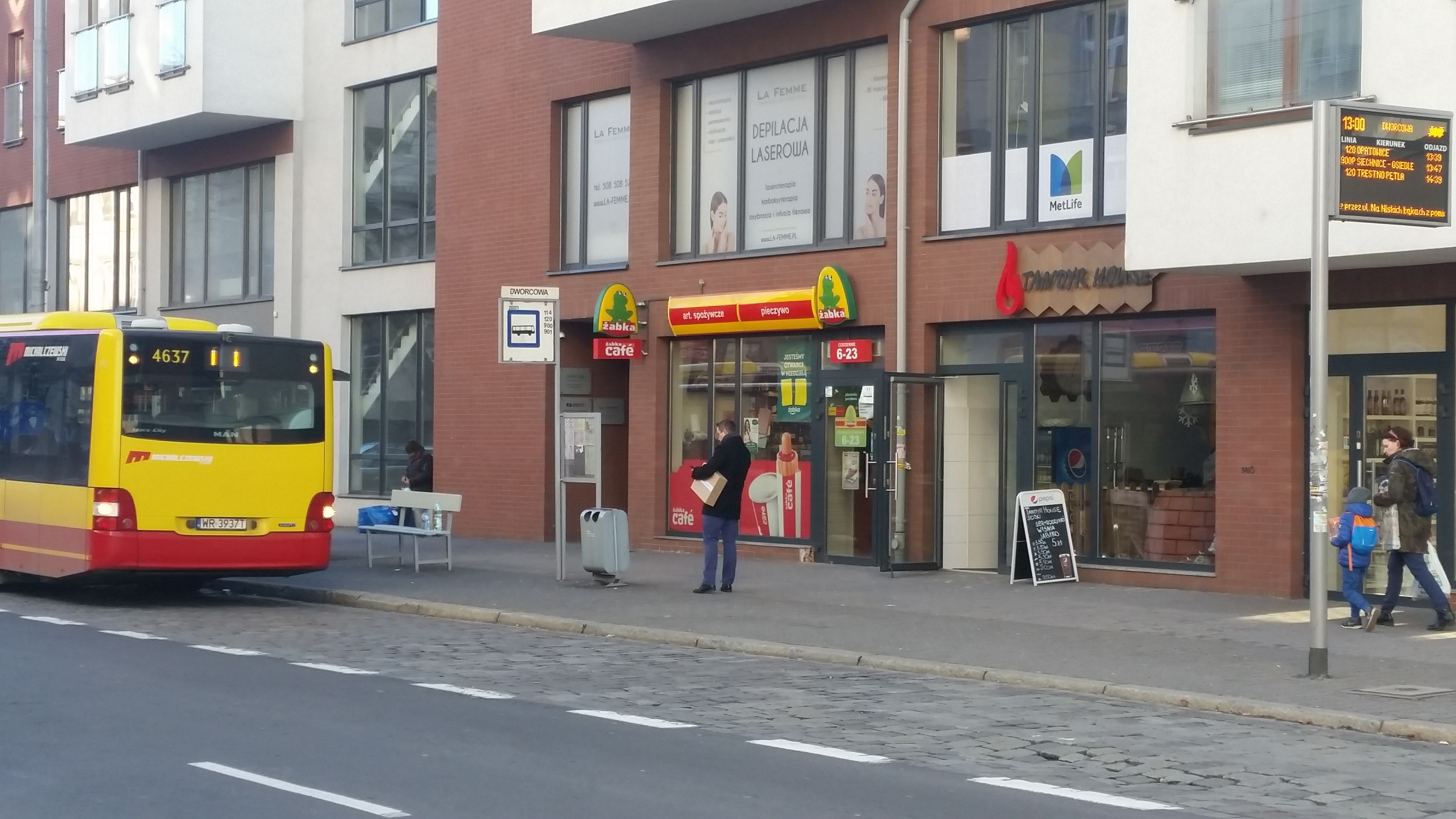
- Location: Wrocław, Poland
- Date: May 19, 2016; 10 years ago 1:43 p.m. (CET)
- Target: Civilians
- Attack type: Extortion-based terrorism
- Deaths: 0
- Injuries: 1
- Perpetrator: Paweł R.
- No. of participants: 1
- Convicted: Paweł R.

The 2016 Wrocław attack was an attempted bombing in Wrocław, Poland, in which one person was injured. Paweł R., a 22-year-old chemistry student at Wrocław University of Science and Technology, placed a homemade explosive device on a bus stopping at Kościuszko Street. Five days later, police arrested him on suspicion of carrying out the attack. During his trial, he stated that he did not intend to harm anyone.

== Attack ==
On May 19, 2016, the suspected perpetrator called emergency services and played an audio recording with a synthesised voice, stating that four bombs have been planted across the city of Wrocław. He demanded 120 kg of gold bars and threatened that the city would become a "second Brussels" if his demands were not met.

At approximately 1:30 p.m. (CET), a man boarded a bus operating on line 145. After several minutes, the bus stopped near the Wrocław Główny railway station, where he exited, leaving behind a bag next to a baby stroller. The stroller's owner, concerned about the unattended item, handed it to the bus driver. While the bus was stopped at a traffic light, the driver inspected the bag and discovered a pot with a substance resembling plasticine. Unable to reach the bus administration, he removed the package and placed it on the sidewalk near a bus stop on Ulica Tadeusza Kościuszki. At 1:43 p.m. (CET), the device exploded, injuring a bystander who sustained wounds to the hand and legs. Approximately 41 people were on board the bus at the time of the incident.

The explosive device was a homemade pressure cooker bomb, similar to the one used in the 2013 Boston Marathon bombing. It consisted of a pressure cooker of about three liters in volume, filled with an improvised explosive mixture and fitted with a homemade fuse made from an alarm clock, a battery, wires, and a shattered Christmas light bulb. The explosive material was a modified form of gunpowder, which prevented the device from detonating with full effectiveness.

== Aftermath ==
Following the attack, Polish police deployed more than 400 officers and released both a facial composite of the suspect and footage from bus security cameras.

After an investigation, police identified Paweł R., a 22-year-old chemistry student at Wrocław University of Science and Technology, as responsible for the incident. According to classmates and teachers, he was in his third year of study but had not been seen at the university for several months prior to the attack. On May 24, 2016, Polish anti-terrorist forces raided his residence in Szprotawa. Although reportedly surprised, Paweł R. complied with authorities during the arrest. During his initial interrogation, he pleaded guilty but declined to provide an explanation or motive.

Court proceedings began on March 20, 2017. Paweł R. was charged with extortion, attempted mass murder, and terrorism. In November 2017, he was sentenced to 20 years in prison. Following an appeal filed by his parents and a psychiatrist in April 2018, the sentence was reduced by five years.
