= Alastair Down (journalist) =

English journalist and broadcaster (1956–2024)

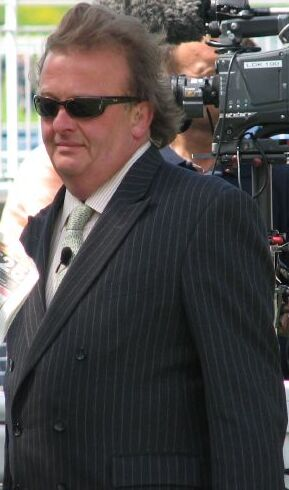
- Down in 2006
- Born: Alastair Gordon Lyell Down; 9 February 1956
- Died: 1 November 2024 (aged 68)
- Education: University of York
- Occupations: Journalist, broadcaster
- Years active: 1979–2024
- Employer: Channel 4 Racing (2001–2012)
- Political party: Liberal Democrats
- Spouse: Frances Down (m. 1988, separated)
- Children: 4 (Note: 1 deceased)
- Awards: Racing Writer of the Year (5 times)

Alastair Gordon Lyell Down (9 February 1956 – 1 November 2024) was an English journalist and broadcaster who wrote for Sporting Life and Racing Post and covered horse racing for Channel 4 Racing.

== Early life and education ==
Alastair Gordon Lyell Down was born on 9 February 1956. His father, Gordon Down, was an insurance broker, and his mother, Pam, was a gardener. He grew up in Bromley. Down graduated from Tonbridge School and later from the University of York. He said that he attended the University of York because seven racecourses were within an hour's drive of it. At university, Down spent much of his time betting on horse races. He boasted that in his final two years there, he attended only two lectures.

== Career ==
Down started his career in 1979 with Raceform, shortly before joining The Sun. He then joined Sporting Life two years later, in 1981. He was made the lead presenter of Channel 4 Racing in 2001. His role on the show was particularly prominent when it focused on jump racing. When Channel 4 Racing employed a new production company in 2012, Down was dropped along with John McCririck and Mike Cattermole, which ended his frequent television appearances.

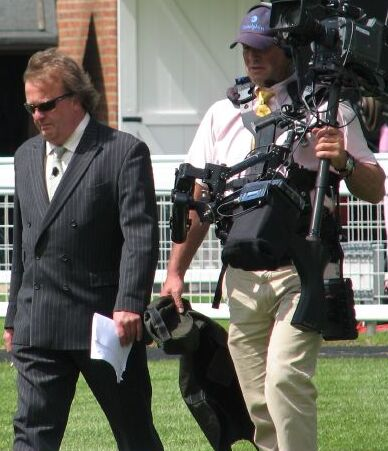
Down (left) at the York Racecourse in 2006

A collection of his writings, titled The Down Side: The Very Best of Racing's Top Writer and TV Presenter, was published in 2012. Its sequel, Cheltenham et Al: The Best of Alastair Down, was compiled by Sean Magee and published in 2014. The book won the 2015 British Sports Book Award in the Best Horse Racing Book category, the last one to do so.

== Personal life and death ==
Down was married to Frances Down (née Werner) from 1988. He later separated from her. They had three children together and he had a daughter from another relationship. His daughter Saskia was killed in the 2019 London Bridge stabbings. According to the Racing Post, he never recovered emotionally from her death and drinking became a "safe haven" for him.

Down resided in Evenlode in Gloucestershire, as of 2012 and in Bledington from December 2020. He died on 1 November 2024, aged 68, after a brief illness.

== Awards and honours ==
Down received the Racing Writer of the Year Award from the Horserace Writers and Photographers Association five times, first in 1994 and most recently in 2018. He was the only journalist to receive the award five times. He was awarded the President’s Award by the association in 2022, receiving it in 2023. The press room of the Cheltenham Racecourse was renamed after him in his honour in October 2024.

== Bibliography ==
- The Down Side: The Very Best of Racing's Top Writer and TV Presenter (Hardcover, Raceform Limited, 1 January 2012; ISBN 1908216050, 978-1908216052, ASIN 1908216050)
- Cheltenham et Al: The Best of Alastair Down (Kindle Edition, Racing Post Books, 28 October 2014; ASIN B00P02EZKO)
- Cheltenham et Al: The Best of Alastair Down (Paperback, updated and revised, Racing Post Books, 18 September 2015; ISBN 1910498033, 978-1910498033)
