= 2016 New York and New Jersey bombings =

Bombing attack in the United States

- New York City Mayor Bill de Blasio and State Governor Andrew Cuomo tour the site of the Manhattan bombing

- Location: 39.925602°N 74.074726°W (Seaside Park); 40.743631°N 73.994308°W (Manhattan); 40.667778°N 74.215°W (Elizabeth); Seaside Park, New Jersey, U.S. Chelsea, Manhattan, New York, U.S. Elizabeth, New Jersey, U.S. Linden, New Jersey, U.S.
- Date: Seaside Park bombing: September 17, 2016, 9:30 a.m. Manhattan bombing: September 17, 2016, 8:31 p.m. Elizabeth bombs discovered and explosion: September 19, 2016, c. 12:40 a.m. Linden shootout: September 19, 2016, 11:23 a.m. (All times are UTC-04:00)
- Attack type: Bombing, shootout, terrorism, attempted murder
- Weapons: Pressure cooker bombs, pipe bombs, 9mm Glock pistol
- Deaths: 0
- Injuries: 34 (31 civilians in Manhattan, 2 police officers and the perpetrator in Linden)
- Perpetrator: Ahmad Khan Rahimi
- Motive: Islamic extremism

On September 17–19, 2016, a series of three constructed bombs exploded, and several unexploded devices were discovered in the New York metropolitan area followed by a subsequent shooting in Linden, New Jersey during a nationwide manhunt to locate the suspected bomber. The bombings and additional police shootout with the perpetrator left 33 people wounded, but no fatalities were reported. Federal and local investigators determined these explosive devices were deliberately set and identified them as part of a terrorist act.

On the morning of September 17, a pipe bomb exploded in Seaside Park, New Jersey which was intended to detonate during a 5K charity race at the height of crowded venues. Later that day, a homemade pressure cooker bomb went off in the Chelsea neighborhood of Manhattan, New York City causing extensive injuries and property damage to adjacent buildings. A second pressure cooker bomb was discovered four blocks away. Late on September 18, multiple bombs were discovered at the train station in Elizabeth, New Jersey. One of these bombs detonated early the following morning in the attempts for authorities to disarm it, blowing apart and destroying the local county police bomb disposal robot.

On September 19, 2016, the sole suspect—Ahmad Khan Rahimi, of Elizabeth—was identified and captured, following a shootout with police in neighboring Linden, New Jersey, which left two officers injured from gunfire. Rahimi was not part of a terrorist group, but his actions were believed to have been influenced by the extremist Islamic ideology espoused by al-Qaeda and the Islamic State. In 2017, Rahimi was convicted in U.S. federal court of eight federal crimes arising from the attack. On February 13, 2018, Rahimi was sentenced to a mandatory term of life without parole.

== Events ==
=== Seaside Park bombing ===
In the morning of September 17, 2016, in Ocean County, New Jersey, the Seaside Semper Five, a 5K run event, was expected to draw as many as 3,000 people, with many of them being veterans of the United States Armed Forces. The race was delayed after a suspicious backpack was noticed in the vicinity of the starting point.

At about 9:30 a.m., shortly before the race was supposed to start, a pipe bomb exploded in a trash can on Ocean Avenue in Seaside Park. Three "rudimentary" pipe bombs, all reportedly timed to go off during the race, were later found, with only one of the three having exploded. Fragments of the device were dispersed into the nearby street and caused a sudden, loud noise which shook buildings and homes nearby. No one was physically hurt by this bombing, however.

The race was canceled after the explosion, and the beach and boardwalk in Seaside Park were evacuated. Police officials and federal agents soon went door-to-door, asking residents about information regarding the bombs or any suspicious activity they may have seen, heard, or witnessed.

=== Manhattan bombing ===
In the Chelsea neighborhood of Manhattan in New York City, on the same day as the Seaside Park bombing, a pressure cooker bomb filled with shrapnel, in the form of small bearings or metal BBs, exploded in a crowded area on West 23rd Street, between Avenue of the Americas and Seventh Avenue at 8:31 p.m. The explosion occurred in front of 133 West 23rd Street in the vicinity of a construction site, at which materials were in place for exterior renovations of the Visions at Selis Manor facility, an apartment building for the blind, at 135 West 23rd Street. Other nearby buildings included the Townhouse Inn of Chelsea, and many restaurants. The Chelsea neighborhood is primarily residential, and has an active nightlife scene.

Witnesses said that the explosion "seemed to have started inside a sidewalk dumpster" in the vicinity of Sixth Avenue, and photographs of a "twisted dumpster" in the middle of West 23rd Street went viral on Twitter. A law enforcement official speaking on condition of anonymity stated that the explosion "appeared to have come from a construction toolbox" in front of a building, and photographs of the area reportedly showed a twisted, crumpled black metal box.

==== Effects ====
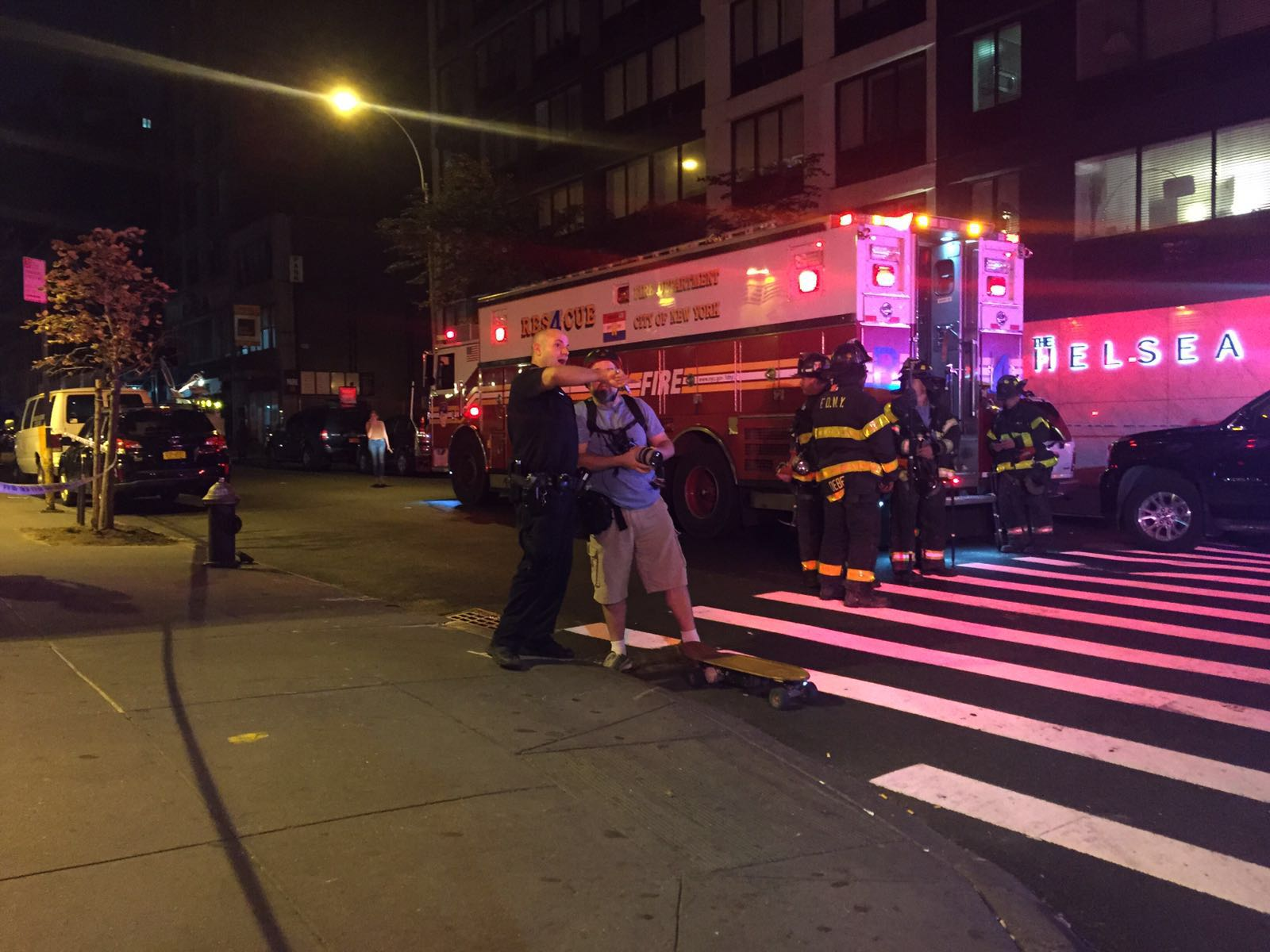
A police officer speaks to a person as fire crews work at the site of the Manhattan bombing

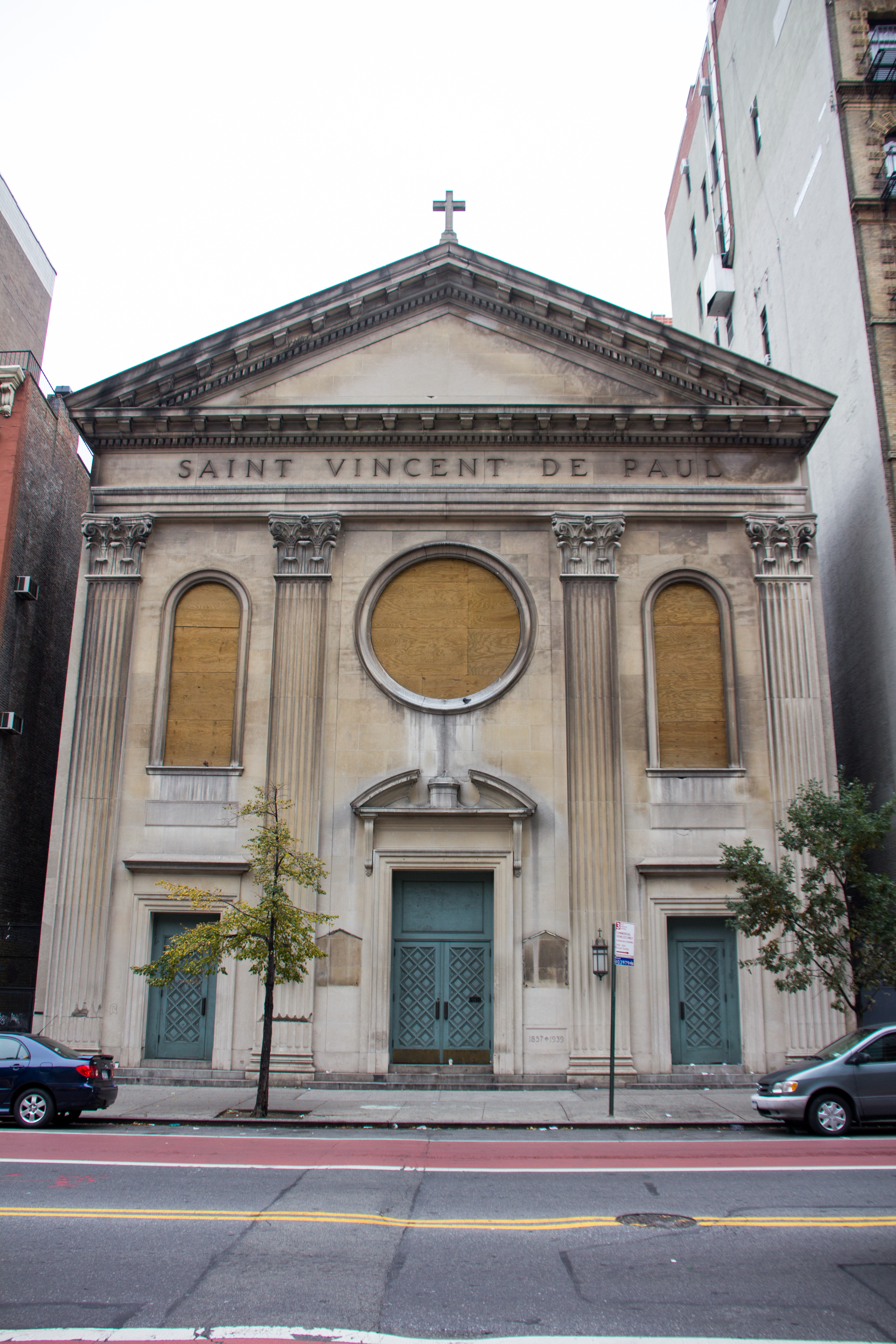
St. Vincent de Paul Church in 2017, with boarded-up windows due to the explosion

The explosion "was powerful enough to vault a heavy steel dumpster more than 120 feet through the air ... Windows shattered 400 feet from where the explosion went off, and pieces of the bomb were recovered 650 feet away." The explosion caused damage to a nearby five-story brownstone, and debris was strewn in front of the St. Vincent de Paul Church. The moment of the blast was captured on closed-circuit television footage from three cameras.

Thirty-one people were injured, 24 of whom were taken to four hospitals. Most injuries were scrapes and bruises caused by flying debris and glass. One victim sustained penetrating trauma to the abdomen and was rushed from the scene in serious condition. Nine of the injured were taken to Bellevue Hospital, including the seriously injured person. Lenox Health Greenwich Village treated another nine victims. By the following morning, all of the injured had been released.

The explosion disrupted travel in Manhattan extensively. A significant zone (14th Street to 34th Street between Fifth Avenue and Eighth Avenue) was closed to car travel overnight. By 7:00 a.m. the following morning, all roads in the neighborhood were reopened except for West 23rd Street. New York City Subway service to stations along West 23rd Street was disrupted while the investigation was ongoing.

==== Discovery of second device ====
Following the explosion, officers began a block-by-block search for additional unexploded bombs. Several hours later, police received a call from a resident of West 27th Street who had seen a suspicious-looking package near her home. The device was under a mailbox at West 27th Street between Sixth and Seventh Avenues, four blocks away from the site of the original blast. Two state troopers arrived and discovered the pressure cooker bomb concealed in a plastic bag and connected with dark wiring to a mobile phone. The bomb was filled with small bearings or metal BBs. The pressure cooker bomb was described as similar to those used in the Boston Marathon bombing. The New York City Police Department (NYPD) reported its find of a "possible secondary device" at 11:00 p.m.

The bomb was removed by an NYPD bomb squad robot. An officer used the robot to place the bomb in a containment chamber, and the device was driven away at around 2:25 a.m. on September 18. Investigators obtained fingerprints and a mobile phone from the device. The bomb was driven to the NYPD's Rodman's Neck firing range in the Bronx, where it was destroyed via a controlled explosion. The devices were to be sent to the FBI Laboratory in Quantico, Virginia, for further inspection.

=== Discovery of bombs in Elizabeth ===
At around 8:00 p.m. on September 18, two men took a backpack they found atop a municipal garbage can at the Elizabeth train station in Elizabeth, New Jersey. One of the men, Lee Parker, was homeless and was looking for a backpack so he could go to a job search. His friend Ivan White had found the backpack above the garbage can. They were about 300 feet (91 m) from a busy pub's front entrance and about 500 feet (150 m) from a train trestle when they took the backpack. White and Parker looked into the backpack, discovered that the item contained wires and a pipe, and called 9-1-1 at around 8:45 p.m. The men, who were not held as suspects, were hailed as heroes in Elizabeth; a GoFundMe campaign in their name raised over $16,000 in donations.

The Elizabeth Police Department was the first authority to respond to the men's 9-1-1 call. The investigation was soon turned over to the New Jersey Transit Police Department and the FBI, two county robots (Union and Essex) confirmed the devices were pipe bombs. One of these bombs was detonated at around 12:40 a.m. as the robots sought to disarm the devices. One robot was "damaged" by the blast. Authorities were working to disable the other devices. Following the bomb's accidental explosion, the station was evacuated. The surrounding area was put on lockdown, and service was suspended between the Newark Airport and Elizabeth stations for the day. New Jersey-bound trains from New York were held at Penn Station.

Elizabeth Mayor J. Christian Bollwage said that it was unclear whether the train station was a specific target, or whether the bombs were dumped by someone looking to quickly get rid of them. The Elizabeth device was "similar in appearance" to the Seaside Park device. Police later theorized that the bomber, Ahmad Khan Rahimi, had thrown away the bombs in Elizabeth in an effort to hide the evidence because these bombs lacked detonators.

== Investigation ==
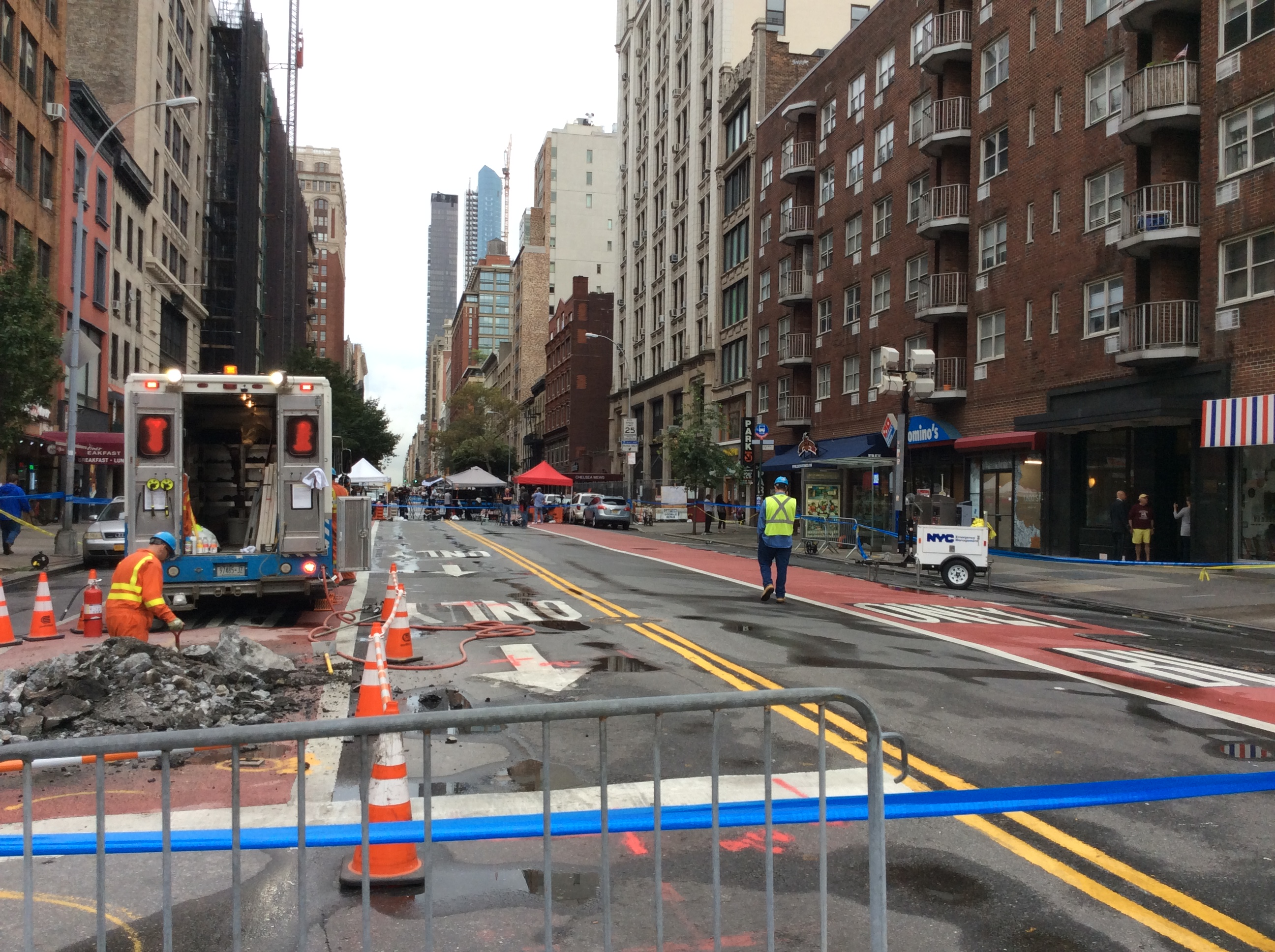
Ongoing investigation at 23rd Street, as seen on September 19, 2016

The Federal Bureau of Investigation (FBI), the Joint Terrorism Task Force (JTTF), Homeland Security, and the Bureau of Alcohol, Tobacco, Firearms and Explosives (ATF) responded to the scene of the Chelsea bombing and were involved in the investigation, in addition to the New York City Fire Department (FDNY) and the NYPD. Initially, the Seaside Park and Manhattan bombings were investigated as separate incidents, but over a period of two days, the investigation yielded similarities between the two incidents, leading the investigators to determine that they were connected, and therefore that it was to be investigated as one overall composite terrorist act or endeavor, committed by the same person or party.

Within hours after the attack, officials determined that the explosion was intentional, and ruled out the possibility of a natural gas explosion. Investigators did not immediately find evidence of a terrorism link, initially leaving open the possibility of arson or vandalism at the time. A link to terrorism was discovered in the following days.

Both of the Manhattan bombs—the one that exploded and the second that was disabled—were of the same design, using pressure cookers filled with bearings or metal BBs that were rigged with flip phones and Christmas lights that set off a small charge of hexamethylene triperoxide diamine (HMTD), which served as a detonator for a larger charge of a secondary explosive similar to Tannerite.

The FBI examined fingerprints from the undetonated West 27th Street pressure cooker bomb and its attached mobile phone. DNA evidence was also recovered. On September 19, the FBI traced the prints, as well as some pictures on the mobile phone, to Ahmad Khan Rahimi (see below).

Three different designs had been used amongst the four explosive devices, with the Department of Homeland Security finding that the bomb-maker followed guidelines featured in Inspire, an online magazine published by al-Qaeda in the Arabian Peninsula. Investigators also said they believed the bomb-maker had cased the Chelsea neighborhood before the bombing there, and that he may have had an accomplice as he would have had to otherwise cover a lot of ground between the bombing sites in a relatively short amount of time. They were talking to witnesses who claimed to have seen Rahimi in the Chelsea area before the explosion. Several bomb ingredients were purchased by Rahimi on eBay between June 20 and August 10.

=== Search for suspects ===
Investigators discovered surveillance video that showed a suspect, later identified as Rahimi, planting a bomb on West 23rd Street in Manhattan then walking to West 27th Street dragging a duffel bag. The subject left the bag at West 27th Street. Later, two individuals took the pressure cooker bomb out of the bag and left the scene. Authorities determined that the two men who had taken the bomb out of the bag were, most likely, scavengers who had only wanted the duffel bag and did not know what they had been handling; in the process, they might have deactivated the bomb in the bag. The NYPD and FBI wished to talk with these men, who were considered possible witnesses but were not suspected in helping plant the bomb. Investigators later believed the men were possible Egyptian tourists who have since returned to their home country. U.S. investigators notified Egyptian authorities that they wanted to question the men. It was later confirmed that the pair were security officers for an airline in the Middle East who, despite their profession, did not register that the device was a bomb and focused only on the chance to take the luggage for themselves – which they soon threw in the garbage at their hotel, rather than contact authorities, when they saw news reports about the hunt for Rahami.

Late on September 18, the day after the Manhattan explosion, the FBI announced that five men, who were later found to be relatives of Rahimi, had been detained in connection with the investigation. The men were detained at about 8:45 p.m. at a traffic stop, which was being conducted by the FBI and NYPD on the Belt Parkway near the Verrazzano–Narrows Bridge.

=== Motive ===
An official speaking to The New York Times on condition of anonymity said, "We don't understand the target or the significance of it. It's by a pile of dumpsters on a random sidewalk." At a news conference the day following the Manhattan bombing, New York Governor Andrew Cuomo said that placing a bomb in a crowded city street was intrinsically a terrorist act, but that "there is no evidence of an international terrorism connection with this incident", while noting that the investigation was still in its early stages. An explosives expert, speaking anonymously, said the materials used in the bomb indicated that the bomb-builder had some knowledge of how to assemble the explosive device.

Voice of America video report

A note found on the pressure cooker bomb left on West 27th Street referred to Anwar al-Awlaki (the Muslim cleric who became a senior member of al-Qaeda and was then killed by a U.S. drone strike), the Boston Marathon bombing, and the 2009 Fort Hood shooting.

On September 20, investigators said that when Rahimi was arrested, he had a notebook in his possession in which he had written about Anwar al-Awlaki, the Boston Marathon bombers Tamerlan and Dzhokhar Tsarnaev, and Abu Mohammad al-Adnani, the spokesperson and a senior leader of ISIL. The notebook had bullet holes and blood stains. In the notebook, Rahimi wrote of "killing the kuffar", an Arabic term for unbelievers.

According to authorities, Rahimi was not part of a terrorist cell, but was motivated and inspired by the extremist Islamic ideology espoused by al-Qaeda founder Osama bin Laden and al-Qaeda chief propagandist Anwar al-Awlaki. The criminal complaint filed against Rahimi states that Rahimi had a YouTube account in which he listed two jihadist propaganda videos as "favorites" alongside other, unrelated materials.

== Perpetrator ==
Ahmad Khan Rahimi
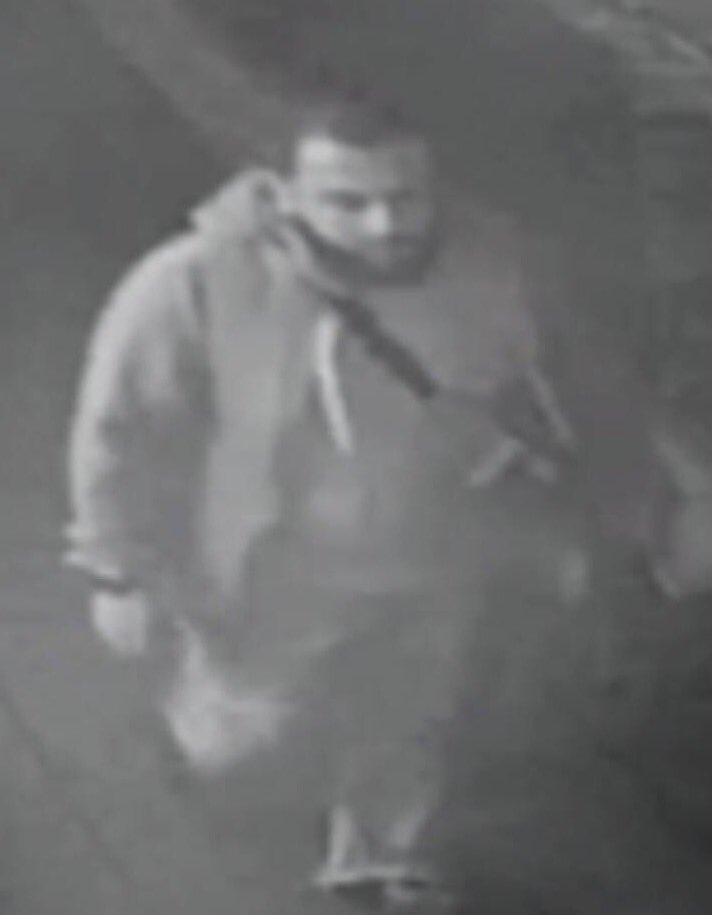
- Surveillance image of Ahmad Khan Rahimi, who was arrested following a manhunt
- Born: January 23, 1988 (age 38); Kandahar, Democratic Republic of Afghanistan
- Citizenship: United States
- Education: Edison High School
- Employer: First American Fried Chicken
- Height: 5 ft 6 in (1.68 m)
- Criminal charges: Federal charges: use of weapon of mass destruction (3 counts); bombing of place of public use (2 counts); destruction of property by means of fire or explosives (2 counts); use of destructive device during and in furtherance of a crime of violence.; New Jersey State charges: attempted murder of a law enforcement officer (5 counts); second-degree unlawful possession of a firearm; second-degree possession of a weapon for an unlawful purpose.
- Criminal penalty: Two consecutive life sentences without the possibility of parole
- Criminal status: Incarcerated at ADX Florence
- Children: 1

=== Background ===
Ahmad Khan Rahimi (Pashto: أحمد خان رحیمی; born January 23, 1988), an Afghan American whose surname was initially reported as Rahami, came to the United States from Afghanistan in 1995, and was naturalized in 2011. He is a native Pashto speaker.

His father, Mohammad Rahimi, came to the U.S. several years earlier seeking asylum. According to a neighbor, Rahimi's father, a Pashtun, had been part of the anti-Soviet mujahideen movement in Afghanistan, and was critical of the Taliban. The younger Rahimi may have as many as seven siblings. Before settling into the U.S., the Rahimi family fled from the then war-torn Afghanistan to Pakistan. In the U.S., they lived in a number of New Jersey towns before settling in Elizabeth.

Rahimi graduated from Edison High School in 2008. From 2010 to 2012, he attended Middlesex County College in Edison, New Jersey, majoring in criminal justice with alleged aspirations of a future in law enforcement. He dropped out.

Rahimi's friends described him as a generous person who was never devoutly religious and would invite his friends to eat and conduct rap battles at his family's fried chicken restaurant—First American Fried Chicken in Elizabeth, 15 miles (24 km) from New York City. To some, he was known as Mad, short for Ahmad. A classmate from Edison High described him as quiet, mild-mannered, well-dressed, and "not abrasive, [but] funny" whenever he spoke. In recent years, though, he seemed to be a "completely different person" who was more stern than before and less easygoing. Also, in elementary school, Ahmad's teacher complained to Mohammad that his son was "act[ing] like a king in class". Ahmad broke a friend's nose while in junior high.

While at Edison High, he started a relationship with a classmate from the Dominican Republic, which culminated in them having a daughter together in 2007, during Rahimi's senior year. According to people close to the Rahimis, this upset Mohammad Rahimi, who refused to meet his granddaughter or the mother, and had been disapproving of the relationship due to expectations that his son would marry a cousin in Afghanistan. In March 2008, after returning from his first trip in Pakistan, he moved in with his girlfriend's family and got a job at a Kmart store. Rahimi's girlfriend later ended the relationship and sued him for child support. This reportedly depressed Rahimi, who subsequently returned to his family, and damaged his relationship with his father.

The Rahimi family had a history of disputes with the City of Elizabeth over their restaurant's operating hours, claiming that the city was discriminating against them because of their ethnicity and because they were Muslim. They filed a lawsuit against the city in 2011, in which they alleged harassment and religious discrimination by police and officials who would force them to close early. Mayor J. Christian Bollwage said the longstanding issues were caused by a series of complaints from neighbors, who reported noise and large crowds gathering at the restaurant late at night. The city later barred all takeout restaurants, including the Rahimis', from operating past 10:00 p.m. In 2009, two of Rahimi's brothers were arrested for attempting to record a conversation with police, according to court papers. Rahimi lived above the restaurant with his family.

In July 2016, Rahimi passed the required background check and legally purchased the Glock 9 mm handgun he used in the subsequent shootout, from a licensed dealer in Salem, Virginia.

==== Legal troubles ====
At one time, Rahimi was licensed to carry firearms. In August 2014, he, at that time living in Perth Amboy, New Jersey, was charged with aggravated assault and unlawful possession of a weapon in Union County. The charges arose from allegations that Rahimi had stabbed his brother in the leg, after the victim and another brother attempted to stop Rahimi from assaulting their mother and sister "for no apparent reason". Rahimi was reported by two of his siblings the next day and spent three months in the Union County Jail, but was reported to have bailed. A grand jury declined to make an indictment, and the charges were dropped on September 22.

A "high-ranking law enforcement official with knowledge of the investigation" said Rahimi had spent two additional days in jail, one in February 2012 for allegedly violating a restraining order, and another in October 2008 for failure to pay traffic tickets.

Rahimi's father Mohammad had tried to contact the FBI about his son around August 2014, but two months later, Rahimi was cleared by the FBI. One reason cited was that Mohammad had stated that he was merely angry over the August domestic incident when he reported his son, so he had denied his previous statement. In an interview with The New York Times, Mohammad claimed that he had seen his son watching videos made by al-Qaeda and the Taliban and asked him to stop. However, the FBI later said Mohammad never informed them of what he had seen.

On September 20 — the day after his arrest — Rahimi's estranged ex-girlfriend, and the mother of his daughter, filed a petition in a New Jersey state court seeking full custody of the child, citing Rahimi as being a possible participant in "terrorist related activity" in New York City. She also filed to change her child's name, as well as to force the media not to contact her or her daughter. The petition for custody was granted the following day, though the request to change the daughter's name was denied, as was the request for media not to contact her, because "the court said it had no authority to grant the requests." Rahimi and the mother of his child had engaged in a long-running battle, as Rahimi owed her more than $3,000 in child support in 2015; she had previously gotten a restraining order against Rahimi.

==== Overseas travels and return to U.S. ====
Rahimi, reportedly, went back to Afghanistan several times (including for an extended period starting in 2012), and "showed signs of radicalization" afterwards. The trips were reportedly arranged by Rahimi's pious father, who was concerned about his son being "too Americanized". Rahimi and members of his family also made several trips to Pakistan, where they had Afghan relatives living as refugees. According to a family friend, Rahimi claimed that his father took away his passport while he was sleeping and left him alone in a foreign country.

Rahimi and a brother spent several weeks in the Pakistani cities of Quetta and nearby Kuchlak, as well as Kandahar, Afghanistan. At Quetta, which is home to a large population of Afghan immigrants and some Taliban members-in-exile, he was in an arranged marriage with a Pakistani woman, believed to be his cousin, in July 2011, and had a son with her in 2014. The son's fate is unknown. Rahimi also went under the wing of a local radical cleric, according to a close relative in Afghanistan. Following Rahimi's arrest, a spokesman for the Afghan Taliban said the group had no connection with him.

In Kuchlak, Rahimi attended an Afghan-run Naqshbandi religious seminary closely associated with the Taliban movement, where he took lectures in Islamic education for three weeks. Rahimi remained in Pakistan from April 2013 to March 2014, and traveled to Afghanistan during the period. Following his near-year-long stay in the region, he underwent additional screening. On both occasions, he stated that he visited family members and was cleared by immigration and customs officials. The FBI did not find any signs of ties to terrorism during background checks.

According to a childhood friend, Rahimi grew a beard, started wearing more religious clothing following his trips to Afghanistan, and began praying in the back of his family's restaurant. When the mobile phone from West 27th Street was examined, investigators found that Rahimi had posted jihadist writings on various websites. In addition, his handwritten journal was found, expressing a desire to become a martyr. However, it was "not known whether he had any links to an overseas terror organization, or whether he had been inspired by such organizations and their propaganda efforts, as others have been." One intelligence source said Rahimi may have been self-radicalized.

In June 2016, Rahimi's wife left the United States, planning to return September 21. On September 19, following her husband's arrest, she was stopped by the United Arab Emirates authorities. Two days later, she returned to New York and was questioned by the investigators. The wife was cooperative and not accused of wrongdoing.

=== Events of September 18–19 ===
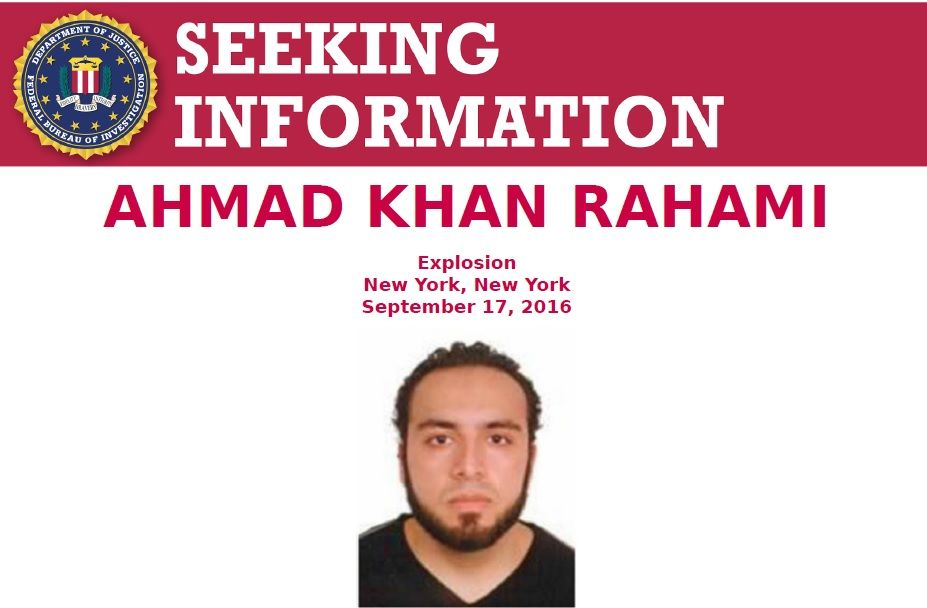
Notice published by the New York FBI, before arrest

==== Manhunt ====
After stopping the five men on the Verrazzano–Narrows Bridge, FBI agents and Elizabeth police searched Rahimi's home in the early morning of September 18. The FBI asked for public assistance in detaining Rahimi for questioning in connection with the bombings in Manhattan and Seaside Park, as well as the attempted overnight bombing in Elizabeth.

At 7:39 a.m. on September 19, the NYPD posted a "Wanted" poster of Rahimi on Twitter. Seventeen minutes later, the Wireless Emergency Alert system was used to send an alert message to the mobile phones of millions of people in New York City, marking the first time New York City used the emergency alert to search for a named suspect. The alert message read, "WANTED: Ahmad Khan Rahami, 28-yr-old male. See media for pic. Call 9-1-1 if seen." Mayor de Blasio said, "Anyone who sees this individual or knows anything about him or his whereabouts needs to call it in right away."

Authorities said that Rahimi might be armed and dangerous. Law enforcement put him on some terror watchlists to prevent him from leaving the United States.

Concurrently, authorities started searching Rahimi's home in Elizabeth. The New Jersey State Police released two tweets, one at 9:30 a.m. and the other at 10:56 a.m., both stating that Rahimi was wanted in connection with the Seaside Park and Elizabeth bombs.

==== Discovery, shootout, and arrest ====
At around 10:30 a.m., Linden bar owner Harinder Baines was in a deli across the street from his bar, watching CNN, when he saw a man sleeping in the bar's doorway. He recognized the man as Rahimi from news reports and called 911, saying "the guy looks a little suspicious and doesn't look good to me." Linden Police Department (Linden PD) Officer Angel Padilla arrived and awoke the man, soon confirming that the man was the wanted Rahimi, and calmly (so as not to alert Rahimi) called for additional units to be dispatched to the location. Officer Padilla ordered Rahimi to show his hands. Rahimi disregarded the order, retrieved a Glock 9mm handgun, and shot Officer Padilla in the abdomen, striking his bulletproof vest.

By this point, four other Linden PD personnel – Investigator Pete Hammer, Investigator Mark Kahana, Officer David Guzman, and Officer Daniel Diaz – were separately arriving in response to Officer Padilla's request for more units. Padilla returned fire as Rahimi fled up the street. Investigator Hammer drove towards Rahimi, who stepped onto the street and fired at Hammer, with the bullet passing through the windshield and grazing Hammer's head; despite being struck by the bullet and cut by flying glass, Hammer drove at Rahimi, who dodged the vehicle and ran on. During the shootout, Rahimi was shot at least seven times, hit in his liver and an artery, and sustained a shoulder wound. None of the officers' injuries or conditions were critical, with Padilla and Hammer both being discharged from hospital within days.

Rahimi was apprehended shortly before noon, and transported to University Hospital by ambulance. He underwent numerous surgeries and was in critical but stable condition. The severity of Rahimi's injuries made his ultimate survival uncertain. Officer Angel Padilla was released from the hospital that night, and Officer Peter Hammer, shot while in his car, was released the next day.

Following Rahimi's arrest, investigators said there was "no indication" he was part of a broader terror cell, nor that such a cell was "operating in the area." Rahimi was said to be initially uncooperative during interrogations.

=== Prosecution ===
==== Federal trial and conviction ====
On September 20, Rahimi was charged in the U.S. District Court for the Southern District of New York in Manhattan, by criminal complaint, with four federal crimes including use of weapons of mass destruction (count one); bombing a place of public use (count two); destruction of property by means of fire or explosives (count three); and use of a destructive device during and in furtherance of a crime of violence (count four). On the same day, the U.S. District Court for the District of New Jersey in Newark charged him with use of a weapon of mass destruction (counts one and two), bombings of a place of public use and public transportation system (count three), and attempted destruction of property by means of fire or explosive (count four).

On September 26, Rahimi's father and wife retained the American Civil Liberties Union (ACLU) to defend him on the federal charges. The ACLU represented Rahimi until he was given a federal public defender. An assistant federal public defender represented Rahimi at trial.

On November 10, after Rahimi had been moved into federal custody in Manhattan, he made an initial appearance in the Manhattan federal court to face terrorism charges. Rahimi's lawyer said in court that Rahimi had eight to ten surgeries and had liver damage. Federal authorities argued that Rahimi was well enough to be in regular custody.

On November 16, Rahimi was indicted by a federal grand jury in Manhattan on eight criminal counts including use of a weapon of mass destruction; attempted use of a weapon of mass destruction; bombing a place of public use; destruction of property by means of fire or explosion; attempted destruction of property by means of fire or explosion; interstate transportation and receipt of explosives; use of a destructive device during, and in furtherance of, a crime of violence (two counts). A day later, Rahimi pleaded not guilty on all of the charges before U.S. District Judge Richard M. Berman.

In April 2017, the defense team filed a motion for a change of venue, requesting that the trial be held in Burlington, Vermont. They argued that the extensive pre-trial publicity in New York would prevent their client from getting a fair trial in Manhattan. The court denied this motion the following month.

While awaiting trial for his federal charges, Rahimi was accused by authorities at the Metropolitan Correctional Center in Manhattan of distributing Islamic extremist propaganda and attempting to radicalize inmates alongside fellow pre-trial inmate and would-be terrorist, Sajmir Alimehmeti. Rahimi had passed on propaganda materials containing lectures and speeches of prominent extremists such as Osama bin Laden and Anwar al-Awlaki, to Alimehmeti, who would then distribute the materials to other MCC inmates. Additionally, explosive-making instructions were passed on to some inmates. Alimehmeti was convicted of attempting to provide material support to the Islamic State in December 2019 and was sentenced to 22 years in prison. Alimehmeti was transferred to ADX Florence shortly afterward.

On October 16, 2017, after a two-week jury trial, Rahimi was found guilty of all eight charges in federal court in New York. The mandatory sentence is life without parole. Rahimi was removed from the courtroom during opening statements after making repeated outbursts. During the trial, the government introduced into evidence Rahimi's fingerprints and DNA on unexploded bombs and bomb debris; videotape of Rahimi pulling the luggage containing the bombs; and testimony from detectives, computer analysts, and others. The government also presented as evidence a journal carried by Rahimi at the time of his arrest that read: "Everything had to be done quietly and I had to lie to cover my tracks. The sounds of the bombs will be heard in the streets. Gun shots to your police. Death to your oppression." The government also presented evidence from Rahimi's Internet bookmarks, which included bomb-making guides that appeared in al-Qaeda propaganda. A juror interviewed following the verdict called the evidence of guilt overwhelming. Officials also stated that he tried to convert other inmates to extremist ideologies before and during the trial. On February 13, 2018, Rahimi was sentenced to life in prison without parole. Rahimi was transferred to United States Penitentiary, McCreary in Kentucky after his sentencing. In 2022, Rahimi was transferred to ADX Florence in Colorado.

==== State prosecution ====
On the night of September 19, Rahimi was charged in New Jersey Superior Court with five counts of attempted murder of a law enforcement officer in relation to the shootout in Linden. He was also charged with second-degree unlawful possession of a weapon and second-degree possession of a weapon for an unlawful purpose, both in relation to the handgun found in his possession.

On October 13, after a delay caused by his ongoing recovery from gunshot wounds, Rahimi appeared, by teleconference, in New Jersey State Court to plead not guilty to the charges against him.

On October 18, Rahimi was moved from the hospital to the New Jersey State Prison in Trenton. On November 10, ahead of hearings in his case, Rahimi was moved from the medical unit at Trenton State Prison to the Metropolitan Correctional Center in Manhattan.

On October 8, 2019 jury found Rahimi guilty of all charges. On January 24, 2020, he was sentenced to life in prison without the possibility of parole.

== Response ==
Governor Cuomo addresses the press near the site of the bombing

Governor Cuomo released a statement following the Manhattan bombing, saying, "We are closely monitoring the situation and urge New Yorkers to, as always, remain calm and vigilant." The day following the bombing, Cuomo and de Blasio toured the damage together.

Hamdullah Mohib, Afghanistan's ambassador to the U.S., released a statement saying the Afghan government condemned the bombings and promising the country's cooperation with the investigation.

In a statement, the Council on American–Islamic Relations welcomed the arrest of Rahimi, saying, "American Muslims, like all Americans, reject extremism and violence, and seek a safe and secure nation. Our nation is most secure when we remain united and reject the fear-mongering and guilt by association often utilized following such attacks."

Security was boosted across New York City's five boroughs as a precaution. Cuomo said that, while there was no ongoing threat, he would deploy 1,000 additional National Guard troopers and State Police officers to major commuter hubs during the United Nations General Assembly meeting which began when the bombings were unfolding.

In the two days following the Manhattan bombing, the NYPD received 406 phone calls reporting suspicious packages in the city. None were found to contain bombs.

The Yelp listing for the chicken restaurant owned by Rahimi's family was review bombed in retaliation for the attempted bombings.

== See also ==
- Jihadist extremism in the United States
- List of terrorist incidents in September 2016
- Terrorism in the United States § 2010s
