= Risk Management Authority (Scotland) =

Public body of the Scottish Government

Agency overview
- Formed: 2005; 21 years ago
- Type: executive non-departmental public body
- Jurisdiction: Scotland
- Headquarters: 7 Thread Street, Paisley PA1 1JR
- Minister responsible: Angela Constance MSP, Cabinet Secretary for Justice and Home Affairs
- Agency executives: Geraldine O'Hare, Convener of the Board; Mark McSherry, Chief Executive
- Parent department: Justice Directorate; Scottish Government
- Website: www.rma.scot

Map
- Scotland in the UK and Europe

The Risk Management Authority is an executive non-departmental public body of the Scottish Government with responsibility for assessing and managing the risks posed by certain serious violent and sexual offenders in Scotland. It was established in 2005 by the Criminal Justice (Scotland) Act 2003.

The authority is required to assess the risk posed by serious offenders at sentencing when the High Court of Justiciary will issue a Risk Assessment Order, and will provide a Risk Assessment Report to the High Court. The judge may then issue an Order for Lifelong Restriction, at which point the authority will have to draw up a risk management plan for the offender.

The authority is based in Paisley.

== Remit and jurisdiction ==
The authority is to be the recognised expert authority on risk assessment and risk management and will:

- develop policy and carry out research into the risk assessment and risk management of offenders whose liberty presents a risk to the public at large
- set standards for, and issue guidance to those involved in the assessment and management of risk
- accredit practitioners and risk management plans and monitor risk management plans for those offenders who receive an Order for Lifelong Restriction sentence from the High Court of Justiciary.

== Order for Lifelong Restriction ==
An Order for Lifelong Restriction is a sentence that can be imposed by a judge of the High Court of Justiciary on serious violent and sexual offenders in Scotland. The power to issue Orders for Lifelong Restriction was implemented by the Criminal Justice (Scotland) Act 2003. Such an Order is an indeterminate sentence will see the convict subject to imprisonment and supervision by electronic tagging for the rest of their lives.

An offender will only be released on licence where it is determined that the risks posed to the community can be correctly and safely managed. The authority is central to the assessment and management of offenders subject to Orders for Lifelong Restriction.

== See also ==
- Antisocial personality disorder
- Forensic psychology
