= Pressure cooker bomb =

Improvised explosive device

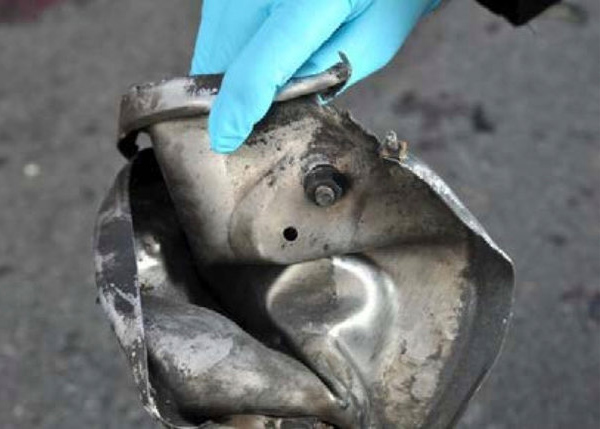
Pressure cooker fragment believed by the FBI to be part of one of the explosive devices used in the 2013 Boston Marathon bombings

A pressure cooker bomb is an improvised explosive device (IED) created by inserting explosive material into a pressure cooker and attaching a blasting cap into the cover of the cooker.

Pressure cooker bombs have been used in a number of attacks in the 21st century. Among them have been the 2006 Mumbai train bombings, 2010 Stockholm bombings (failed to explode), the 2010 Times Square car bombing attempt (failed to explode), the 2013 Boston Marathon bombing, and the 2016 New York and New Jersey bombings.

== Description ==
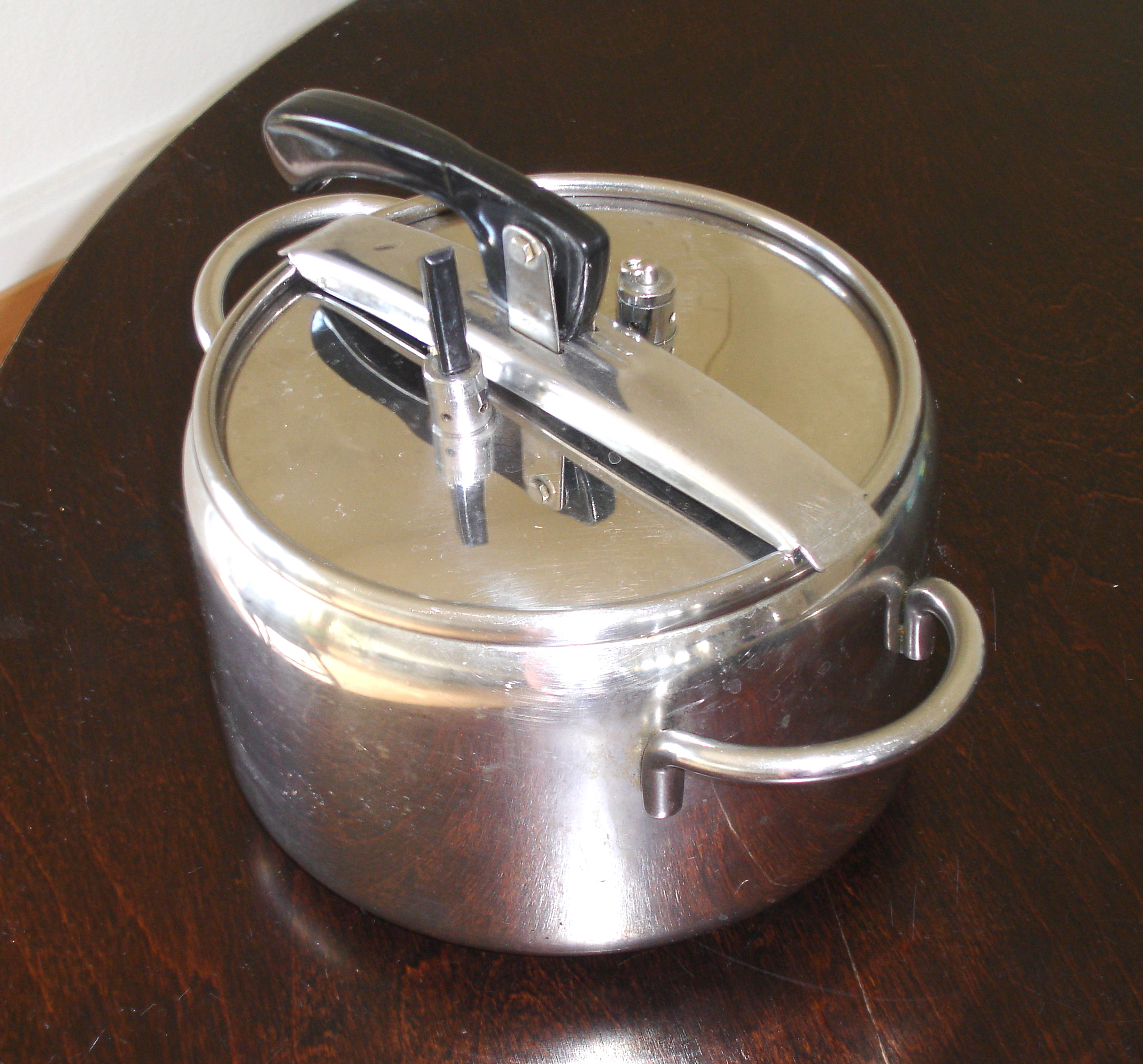
Pressure cooker

Pressure cooker bombs are relatively easy to construct. Most of the materials required can be easily obtained. The bomb can be triggered using a simple electronic device such as a digital watch, garage door opener, cell phone, pager, kitchen timer, or alarm clock. The power of the explosion depends on the size of the pressure cooker and the amount and type of explosives used.

Similar to a pipe bomb, the containment provided by the pressure cooker means that the energy from the explosion is confined until the pressure cooker itself explodes. This in turn creates a relatively large explosion using low explosives and generating potentially lethal fragmentation.

== History ==
=== 2000–2009 ===
French police prevented a terrorist attack in Strasbourg, France, on New Year's Eve 2000. Ten militants were convicted for the plot.

From 2002–04, pressure cooker bombs were widely used in terror and IED attacks in Afghanistan, India, and Pakistan.

In 2003 a terrorist from Chechnya named Abdullah, carrying a pressure cooker bomb, detonated explosives and killed six people before being arrested near Kabul International Airport in Afghanistan. The Taliban claimed responsibility. In 2004, the Department of Homeland Security issued a warning to US agencies about pressure cookers being converted to IEDs.

In July 2006, in Mumbai, India, 209 people were killed and 714 injured by pressure cooker bombs in the 2006 Mumbai train bombings. According to Mumbai Police, the bombings were carried out by Lashkar-e-Taiba and Students' Islamic Movement of India (SIMI).

=== 2010–present ===
Step-by-step instructions for making pressure cooker bombs were published in an article titled "Make a Bomb in the Kitchen of Your Mom" in the Al-Qaeda-linked Inspire magazine in the summer of 2010, by "The AQ chef". The article describes the technique as a simple way to make a highly effective bomb. Analysts believe the work was the brainchild of Anwar al-Awlaki, and edited by him and by Samir Khan. Inspire's goal is to encourage "lone wolf" Jihadis to attack what they view as the enemies of Jihad, including the United States and its allies.

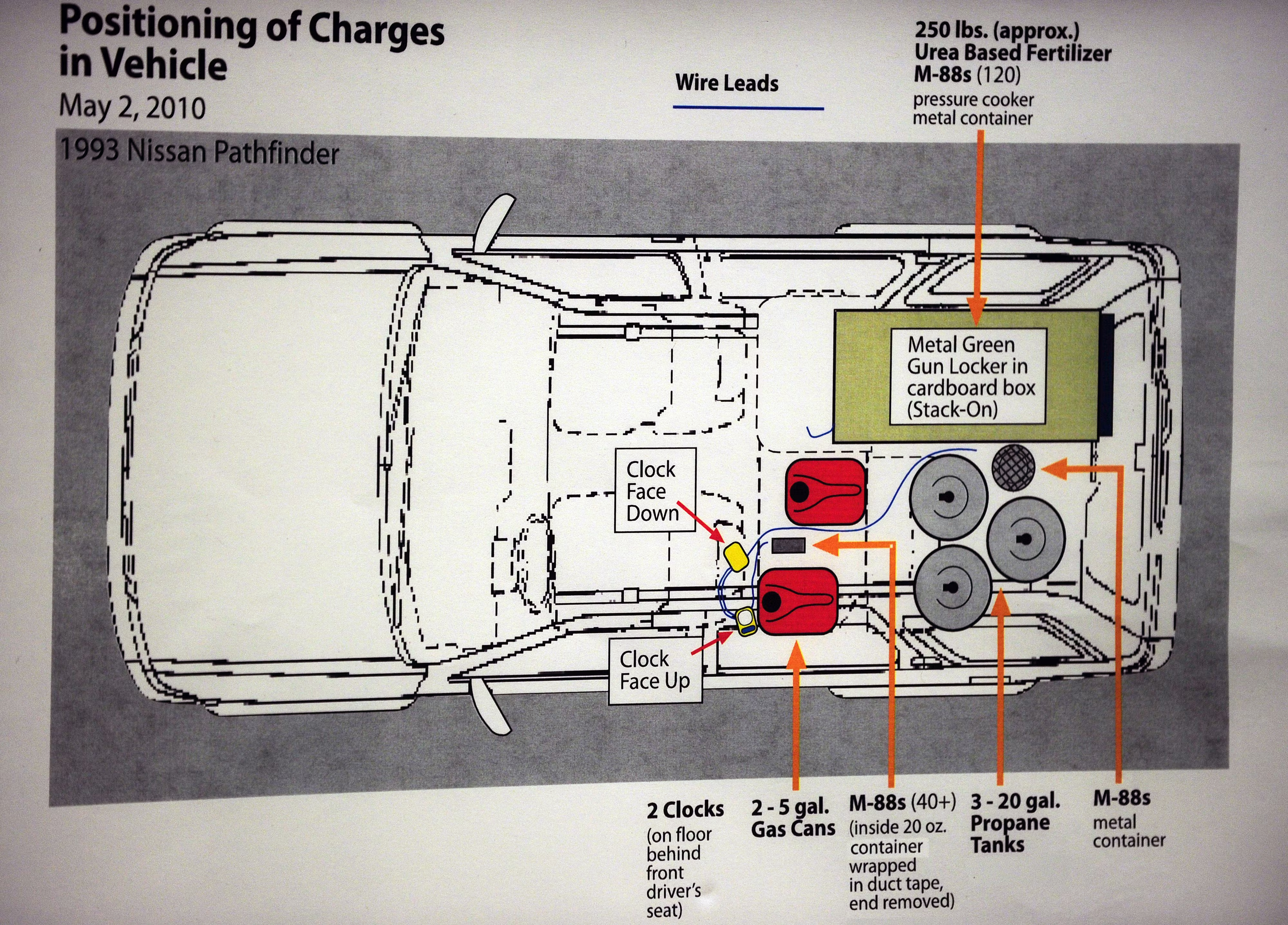
Justice Department diagram showing positioning of pressure cooker in Faisal Shahzad's vehicle in New York’s Times Square bombing

Several Islamic radical terrorist attempts in the 2010s involved pressure cooker bombs. The unsuccessful Times Square car bombing attempt in May 2010, in New York City, included a pressure cooker bomb which failed to detonate. The bomb-maker, Faisal Shahzad, was sentenced to life in prison. In the December 2010 Stockholm bombings, Taimour Abdulwahab al-Abdaly, an Islamic extremist suicide bomber who cited Swedish troops in Afghanistan as justification for the attack, set up a pressure cooker bomb, which failed to detonate.

In Pakistan, in March 2010, six employees of World Vision International were killed by a remotely detonated pressure cooker bomb. The 2010 Stockholm bombings in Sweden involved pressure-cooker bombs.

Pressure cooker bombs were utilized in the 2011 Marrakesh bombing, where Adil El-Atmani, a Moroccan citizen who had pledged allegiance to Al-Qaeda in the Islamic Maghreb, remotely detonated 2 homemade bombs, killing 17 and injuring 25.

In July 2011, Naser Jason Abdo, a U.S. Army private at Fort Hood, Texas, who took pressure cooker bomb-making tips from the Al-Qaeda magazine article, was arrested for planning to blow up a restaurant frequented by U.S. soldiers. Two pressure cookers and bomb-making materials were found in his hotel room. He was sentenced to life in prison.

In October 2012, French police found a makeshift pressure cooker with bomb-making materials near Paris as part of an investigation into an attack on a kosher grocery store.

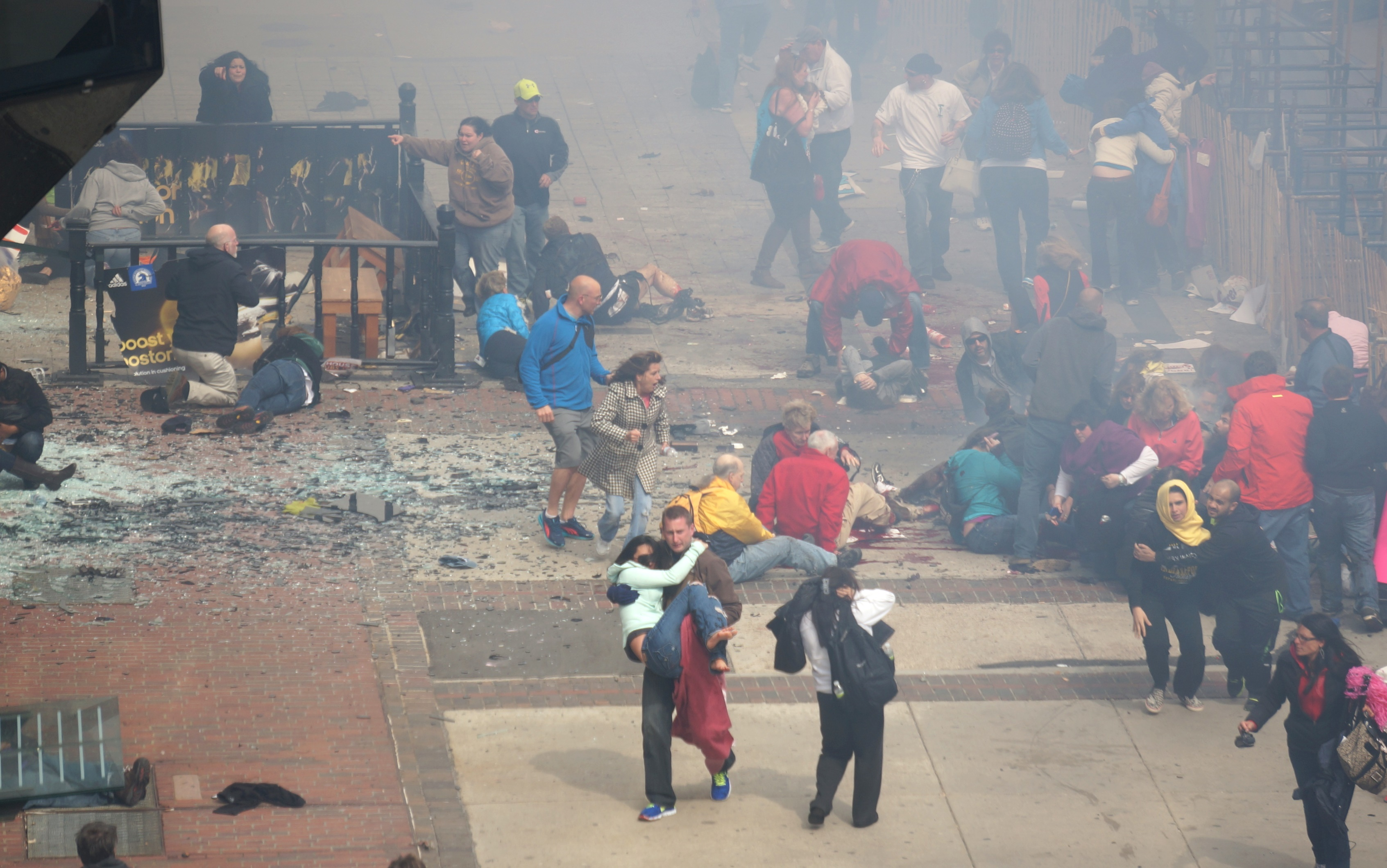
Aftermath of the first blast of the Boston Marathon bombing

Two pressure cooker bombs were used in the Boston Marathon bombings in April 2013. The pressure cookers were filled with nails, ball bearings, and black powder. Initially, it was believed the devices were triggered by kitchen-type egg timers, however, subsequent evidence indicated a remote device was used to trigger the bombs. One of the bombers, Dzhokhar Tsarnaev, told investigators that he learned the technique from an article in Inspire magazine.

On Canada Day 2013, pressure cooker bombs failed to explode at the Parliament Building in Victoria, British Columbia.

On May 19, 2016, passengers on a bus in Wrocław, Poland, alerted the driver to a suspicious package. The driver removed the package from the bus. Shortly later it exploded with no fatalities but did injure one woman slightly. Authorities believed it was a three liter pressure cooker packed with nails and nitrate explosive.

On September 17, 2016, an explosion occurred in Lower Manhattan, New York, wounding 29 civilians. The origin of the explosion was found to be a pressure cooker bomb. At least one other bomb was found unexploded. A suspect for that explosion and others in New Jersey, Ahmad Khan Rahami, was captured two days later.

The foiled 2016 Sweden terrorism plot involved pressure-cooker bombs.

On January 20, 2023, Mohammad Farooq, a student nurse, was arrested outside the maternity ward of St James's University Hospital in Leeds, after planning to detonate a homemade pressure cooker bomb inside the hospital. A patient at the hospital had talked Farooq down from detonating the bomb. Farooq was sentenced to 37 years in prison.

== See also ==
- Car bomb
- Nail bomb
- Time bomb
