= Imprisonment for public protection =

2005–2012 type of criminal sentence in the UK

In England and Wales, imprisonment for public protection (IPP; Welsh: carcharu er mwyn diogelu'r cyhoedd) was a form of indeterminate sentence introduced by section 225 of the Criminal Justice Act 2003 (with effect from 2005) by the Home Secretary, David Blunkett, and abolished in 2012. It was intended to protect the public against criminals whose crimes were not serious enough to merit a normal life sentence but who were regarded as too dangerous to be released when the term of their original sentence had expired. It is composed of a punitive "tariff" intended to be proportionate to the gravity of the crime committed, and an indeterminate period which commences after the expiry of the tariff and lasts until the Parole Board judges the prisoner no longer poses a risk to the public and is fit to be released. The equivalent for under-18s was called detention for public protection, introduced by s. 226 of the 2003 Act. The sentences came into effect on 4 April 2005.

Although there is no limit to how long prisoners can be detained under IPPs, and some may never be released, they may be released on review; an IPP sentence is not a sentence of life imprisonment with a whole-life tariff.

In 2007, the Queen's Bench Division of the High Court ruled that the continued incarceration of prisoners serving IPPs after tariff expiry where the prisons lack the facilities and courses required to assess their suitability for release was unlawful, causing concern that many dangerous offenders would be freed. In 2010 a joint report by the chief inspectors of prisons and probation concluded that IPP sentences were unsustainable with UK prison overcrowding. David Blunkett himself admitted in the House of Lords in 2021 that he had got it wrong.

In 2011, Prime Minister David Cameron said that IPP sentences were "unclear, inconsistent and uncertain" and that the meaning of IPP sentences was not clear to the public. The IPP sentence for new cases was abolished by the Legal Aid, Sentencing and Punishment of Offenders Act 2012, enacted under the coalition government. From 2005 until abolition in 2012, a total of 8,711 IPP sentences were imposed by courts (with some inmates receiving more than one IPP sentence). At the time of abolition of IPP sentences in new cases in 2012, approximately 6,000 inmates remained imprisoned for public protection. Over 4,600 remained in June 2015; more than 3,000 remained by 2017, and 2,909 remained as of June 2023, of whom more than half had been held for at least 10 years after the expiration of their tariff. At the end of March 2023 there were approximately 1,355 offenders serving IPP sentences who had never been released from prison (many other IPP inmates had been released, but then later recalled to prison). Hundreds of IPP prisoners had served five times the minimum.

The government's policy was that IPP prisoners remained in prison until it was deemed that the risks they posed if released were manageable. Some of the alleged victims of John Worboys whose cases were not taken up by the Crown Prosecution Service were assured that the IPP sentence in effect meant a life sentence.

In 2023, Alice Jill Edwards, the United Nations Special Rapporteur on Torture and Other Cruel, Inhuman or Degrading Treatment or Punishment, criticised IPP sentences for the psychological harm they inflicted, saying, "The resulting distress, depression and anxiety are severe for prisoners and their families." According to the Prison Reform Trust, as of 2016 there were 550 incidents of self-harm for every 1,000 prisoners serving an IPP sentence.

In November 2023 the Ministry of Justice announced changes under which sentences would end immediately for about 1,800 offenders released on licence once the legislation comes into force, with more becoming eligible for Parole Board consideration later. However, this would not apply to people in prison, in some cases for minor offences such as stealing a telephone.

In August 2026, following Andy Burnham becoming Prime Minister, the government announced they would seek to end IPP sentencing during the term of the next Parliament.

== See also ==
- Involuntary commitment
- Incapacitation (penology)
- Order for Lifelong Restriction, the Scottish equivalent
