= Inspire (magazine) =

Online Jihadist magazine published by Al-Qaeda

- Editor: Unknown; former editor Samir Khan
- Categories: Propaganda
- First issue: July 2010
- Country: Yemen
- Language: English

Inspire is an English-language online magazine published by the organization al-Qaeda in the Arabian Peninsula (AQAP). The magazine is one of the many ways AQAP uses the Internet to reach its audience. Numerous international and domestic extremists motivated by radical interpretations of Islam have been influenced by the magazine and, in some cases, used its bomb-making instructions in their attempts to carry out attacks. The magazine is an important brand-building tool, not just of AQAP, but of all al-Qaeda branches, franchises and affiliates.

== History ==
The magazine is aimed at young British and American readers and provided translated messages from Osama bin Laden. The first issue appeared in July 2010. Various articles in the second issue encouraged terror attacks on U.S. soil, suggesting that followers open fire at a Washington, D.C. restaurant or use a pickup truck to "mow down" pedestrians.

The October 2010 issue included an article penned by Samir Khan, in which he wrote, "I am proud to be a traitor to America". Khan was killed on 30 September 2011, in the U.S. targeted killing Predator drone attack in Yemen.

== Purpose ==
The magazine's aim is to inform and persuade a committed audience by distributing internal communications called "auto-propaganda" to strengthen morale, reduce dissent, or justify and legitimize an attack or controversial doctrine. It was also used to target an uncommitted audience to eventually win sympathy and support. Therefore, AQAP has the ability to represent themselves and their actions exactly as they wish. The controlled message is unfettered from the scrutiny of the local and international media.

Bruce Riedel of the Brookings Institution described the magazine as "clearly intended for the aspiring jihadist in the U.S. or U.K. who may be the next Fort Hood murderer or Times Square bomber". It was described by Michelle Shephard, author of Guantanamo's Child, and a reporter for the Toronto Star, as being an extension of the online Arabic magazine Sada al-Malahim (Echo of the Battle).

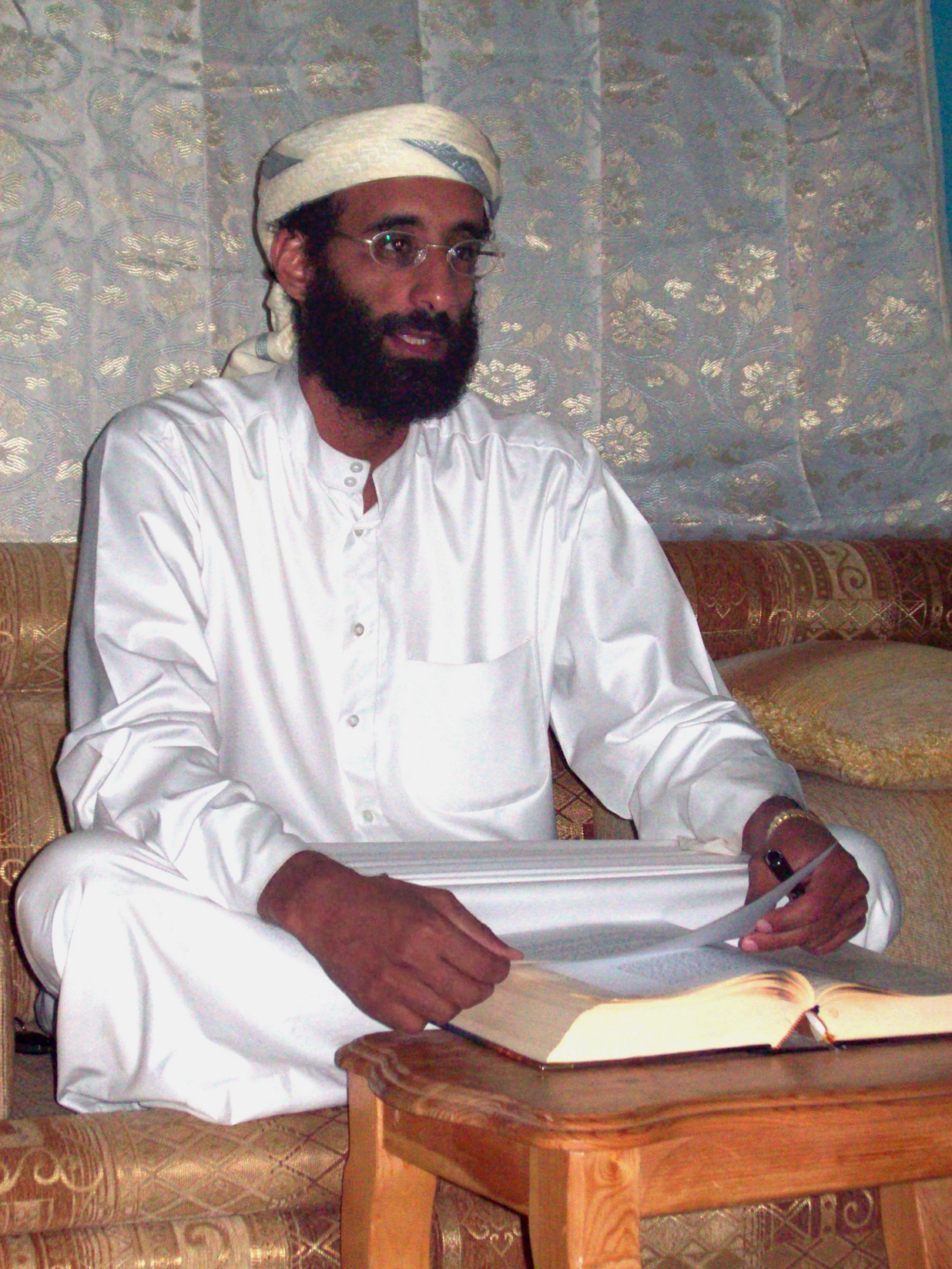
Anwar al-Awlaki

The magazine was thought to be the work of Anwar al-Awlaki, an English-speaking cleric and al-Qaeda leader based in Yemen. Awlaki was on the United States' "kill or capture list". An editorial by al-Awlaki, entitled "May Our Souls Be Sacrificed For You", appeared in the first issue. In the article, al-Awlaki called for attacks against all those who had slandered the Islamic prophet, Muhammad, including all Western targets.

The magazine stated that its title came from a verse in the Qur'an, "Inspire the believers to fight" and described itself as "A special gift to the Islamic Nation". The magazine was first "discovered" online by the SITE Institute. When the first issue of the magazine was initially released, a technical error prevented most of the magazine's pages from loading properly.

The magazine encouraged its readers to submit their own material for publication: "We also call upon and encourage our readers to contribute by sending their articles, comments and suggestions to us." The magazine's production users were able to use multiple third-party sources (photos, videos, etc.) to create content with ease. The use of mass media was also capable of doctoring content. The separation of form and content of the media and then the ability to "mash" content together with little effort had the ability to create persuasive presentations that would catch the attention of the intended audience.

This sort of crowd-sourcing has been influential in motivating extremists. Mohamad Osman Muhammed, for example, who was implicated in a plot to bomb the Portland Christmas tree lighting ceremony in 2010, had previously been published in a different English-language magazine called Jihad Recollections.

== Common themes ==
=== Defensive jihad ===
Declarations were made for Muslims to rise in defense of their Muhammad, families, justice, and the umma. AQAP propagated the U.S. bombing of Yemen and categorically targeting women and children. Thus they used this alleged targeting as justification of Omar al-Faruq's attack as retaliation. "Al-Qaeda says that violence is just retribution for Western injustices and that Islam authorizes this position."

=== Call to individual jihad ===
The articles in Inspire were designed to incite hostility toward non-believers and the West. Its recruitment strategy was rooted in conspiracy theories and the ideology of defensive jihad. The magazine outlined expectations for jihad, discussing both open-front and individual jihad. It argued that engaging American forces directly or traveling overseas for jihad was increasingly difficult. As a result, it promoted individual obligatory (fard'ayn) jihad as the necessary course of action while the Islamic nation remained strategically weak.

[S]pontatenous [sic] operations performed by individuals and cells here and there over the whole world, without connections between them, have put the local and international intelligence apparatus in a state of confusion, as arresting the members of aborted cells does not influence the operational activities of others who are not connected with them.

=== "Open source jihad" ===
Inspire promoted "open source jihad". This shifted away from al-Qaeda's traditional terrorist attacks to simple attacks by individuals using common items for weapons. The Summer 2010 issue advised making a pressure cooker bomb using everyday materials ("How to make a bomb in the kitchen of your mom").

The Fall 2010 issue encouraged using one's car to "mow down" people in crowded places ("The ultimate mowing machine"). The Winter 2010 issue discussed how to blow up buildings. These provided individuals with simple ideas for terror attacks, without direct ties to al-Qaeda or its affiliates. It had become too great a threat to travel abroad and receive training in al-Qaeda training camps, and direct contact with al-Qaeda members endangered the member and the aspiring terrorist. Therefore AQAP's "open source jihad" promoted attacks without the support of a physical community. Marc Sageman, a leading expert in the field, described this phenomenon as "leaderless Jihad". While he considered this threat as "self-limiting" and one that would quickly die out, the difficulties in stopping the lone wolf attackers were great.

"Open source jihad" emerged as a necessary tactic as al-Qaeda leadership steadily vanished in the ten years since 9/11. With leaders either dead or in jail, al-Qaeda had to consider new ways to attack its enemies. Al-Qaeda first splintered into "franchises" by country or region, then further degenerated into solo operators, mostly of dubious capabilities. Inspire became an important al-Qaeda brand tool for recruiting, informing, and motivating these open source jihadis.

== Authenticity ==
Some scholars, such as Thomas Hegghammer (of the Norwegian Defence Research Establishment) and Jarret Brachman, argued that the magazine was an unexceptional example of jihadist online literature and did not deserve the media attention it received. Hegghammer wrote that "there is nothing particularly new or uniquely worrying" about the magazine's content, and its connection to AQAP is likely weak: "Without signals intelligence it is extremely difficult to determine the precise nature of the link between the editors and the AQAP leadership. Judging from the amount of recycled material in Inspire, I would be surprised if the AQAP connection is very strong."

While the SITE Institute and at least one senior U.S. government official described Inspire as authentic, there was some speculation on jihadist websites and elsewhere that the magazine, due to its low quality, may have been a hoax. This theory was advocated, in particular, by Max Fisher, a writer for The Atlantic. Fisher listed five reasons to suspect the publication was a hoax. According to Fisher, the portable document format (PDF) file that contained the first issue also contained a computer virus. Fisher noted that the magazine contained an article by Abu Mu'sab al-Suri, noting that al-Suri had been imprisoned in Guantanamo Bay since 2005, and that whether he was actually tied to al-Qaeda remained unclear. The article attributed to al-Suri was the beginning of a series that appeared in the next five issues of Inspire. These excerpts were all copied from a translation of Abu Musab al-Suri's "The Global Islamic Resistance Call", which was published in a 2008 biography of him.

Peter Bergen, the national security analyst for CNN, describing it as "a slick Web-based publication, heavy on photographs and graphics that, unusually for a jihadist organ, is written in colloquial English", on 31 March 2011 discussed the column of Yemeni-American cleric Anwar al-Awlaki, a leader of AQAP, in its fifth issue.

== Audience ==
Inspire is a unique terrorist publication in that it is very specific in the audience in which it targets instead of publishing general ideological arguments to all Muslims. Studies in terrorism have noted that most Islamic terrorist attacks on the West are perpetrated by well-educated men living in the West, with an average age of 26 years. AQAP also is aware of this, and Inspire magazine targets this demographic.

One example is in the use of imagery and text in the operations of Abyan in the Fall 2010 edition. The images are of operations directed against Yemeni troops at checkpoints, base ambushes, explosions, and "cleaning the streets" (killing the enemy). The photos show images of actions performed by the mujahid against the murtad. The captions tell a story of victory for the holy warriors with few casualties. The images and text portray a story of invincibility and of defeat of Yemen's Special Forces.

== Issues ==
- Issue 1, released July 2010, provides bomb-making directions.
- Issue 2, released October 2010, calls for attacks on the U.S.
- Issue 3, released November 2010, calls for explosive devices to be put on U.S. bound aircraft.
- Issue 4, released January 2011, continues to call for attacks on the U.S.
- Issue 5, released March 2011, focuses on the "Arab Spring".
- Issue 6, released July 2011, focuses on the death of Osama bin Laden.
- Issue 7, released September 2011, focuses on the anniversary of the September 11, 2001 attacks.
- Issue 8, released May 2012, renewed calls for attacks on the U.S.
- Issue 9, also released May 2012, emphasizes suicide missions.
- Issue 10, released March 2013, calls for lone wolf attacks on the U.S.
- Issue 11, released May 2013, celebrates the Boston Marathon bombing.
- Issue 12, released March 2014, calls for car bomb attacks in U.S. cities.
- Issue 13, released December 2014, includes instructions for making a "hidden bomb" that could evade airport security checks, and tips as to which airlines should be targeted.
- Issue 14, released September 2015, includes information on assassination operations, converting black people in America to their cause, and a military analysis of the Charlie Hebdo shooting.
- Issue 15, released May 2016, focuses on "professional assassinations"
- Issue 16, released November 2016, covers pressure cooker bombs, the attack on the USS Cole, and the September 2016 New York and New Jersey bombings.
- Issue 17, released August 2017, provides instructions on train derailment operations.
- Issue 18, released December 2023, published in video format, provides instructions and information on airplane bombing as revenge for the United States support for Israel in the Gaza war.
- Issue 19, released February 2024, published in video format, theologically justifies attacks against the United States.

== Al-Shamika ==
Al-Shamika (the high, elevated (feminine)) was a new fashion and lifestyle magazine for Muslim women and suicide bombers published online by al-Qaeda.

== Legality ==
=== United Kingdom ===
Possession of Inspire without reasonable excuse has been successfully prosecuted under Section 58 of the Terrorism Act 2000. Several people have been arrested and jailed for possessing the magazine, and copies have also been found in the possession of British terrorism suspects. One of the Operation Guava plotter's "key" assets was copies of Inspire. Mohammed Abu Hasnath, 19, of east London, was arrested in October 2011 and sentenced in May 2012 to 14 months in jail for possessing several editions of Inspire.

On 6 December 2012, Ruksana Begum, 22, of Islington, north London, was sentenced to one year in prison after two editions of Inspire were found on a microSD card in her phone following an anti-terrorist raid in June of that year. Her brothers, Gurukanth Desai and Abdul Miah were sentenced to 12 and 16 years imprisonment respectively in February 2012 after pleading guilty to a plot to blow up the London Stock Exchange. Passing sentence, Justice Fulford stated that Begum "is of good behaviour and a good Muslim" and there was nothing to suggest she was involved in terrorist activity. He accepted that she gathered the material in an attempt to explore and understand the charges her brothers faced. After taking into account time spent on remand, Begum would be released in one month, after serving half her sentence.

=== Australia ===
On 16 April 2013, an Australian man from Melbourne was arrested for possessing and collecting editions of the magazine on a USB drive.

=== United States ===
The magazine is not banned in the United States, as a result of the First Amendment's protection of freedom of speech. In May 2013, U.S. Attorney Barry Grissom told students during an event at Wichita State University that authorities monitor extremist groups' websites, including Inspire.

== Operation Cupcake ==
Circa June 2010, an MI6 and GCHQ cyberwarfare operation replaced "Make a bomb in the Kitchen of your Mom" by "The AQ Chef" with a web page of recipes for "The Best Cupcakes in America", written by Dulcy Israel, a staff editor at Entertainment Weekly, produced by Main Street Cupcakes, Hudson, Ohio, and published by The Ellen DeGeneres Show. MI6 and GCHQ also removed articles by Osama bin Laden and Ayman al-Zawahiri, and the article "What to expect in Jihad". Al-Qaeda reissued the magazine two weeks later.

== See also ==
- Dabiq (magazine)
- Soldier of Fortune
