= Fieldcraft =

Techniques of working in the field

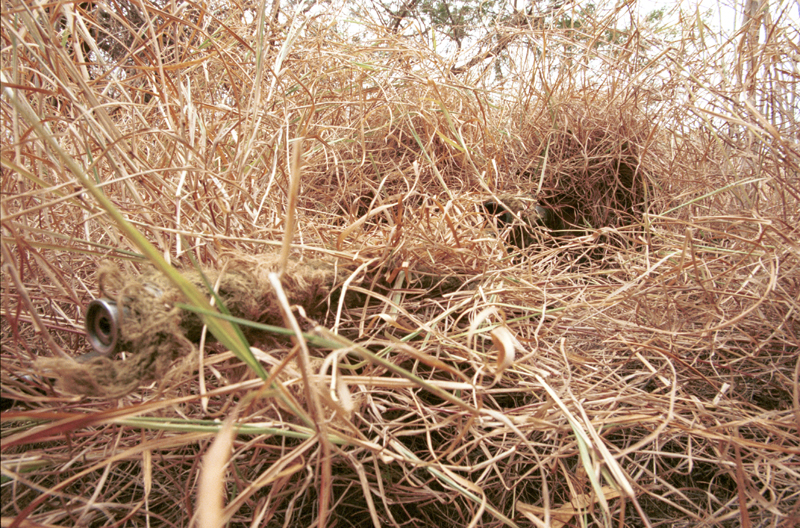
A camouflaged sniper lying prone

Fieldcraft comprises the techniques and methods involved in living, traveling, or making military or scientific observations in the field. The term "fieldcraft" is used in a broad range of industries including military, oil and gas, wildlife and food and agriculture.

In the anti-terrorism field, field craft is "the art of evading monitoring by police and the security services." Terror groups such as the one tracked by Operation Guava were caught "despite their own well developed field craft."

The term has been used since at least World War II. For example, Diana Rowden, a war hero, was described at the time as "very good in field craft and excellent with guns”.

Field skills include camouflage, land and water navigation, understanding the difference between concealment from view and cover from small arms fire, using the terrain and its features to mask ground movement, obstacle crossing, selecting good firing positions, lying-up positions, camping positions, effective observation, camouflage penetration, countersurveillance, detecting enemy-fire directionality and range, survival, evasion, and escape techniques.

Good fieldcraft is especially important for the effectiveness and survival of infantry soldiers, snipers, special forces, reconnaissance and sabotage teams. Efficient fieldcraft is only possible by spending time, effort, and attention to memorizing battlefield details, infiltration and escape routes, construction and employment of hiding positions, enemy force doctrines and equipment.

== See also ==
- Intonjutsu
- Survivalism
- Ghillie suit
- Escape and evasion
