= Order for lifelong restriction =

An order for lifelong restriction is a sentence that can be imposed by a judge of the High Court of Justiciary of Scotland on serious violent and sexual offenders in Scotland. Such an order is an indeterminate sentence that will see the convict subject to indefinite imprisonment and supervision by electronic monitoring for the rest of their lives. An offender will only be released on licence where it is determined that the risks posed to the community can be correctly and safely managed.

== Process ==
Orders for lifelong restriction were implemented by the Criminal Justice (Scotland) Act 2003, which gives a judge of the High Court of Justiciary the power to impose a sentence for serious violent and sexual offences, that includes the life imprisonment or detention of the offender. A judge of the High Court, either on their own initiative or at the request of the prosecutor, will issue a risk assessment order and require the Risk Management Authority to assess the risk posed by serious offenders, and will provide a risk assessment report to the High Court. The judge may then issue an order for lifelong restriction, at which point the authority will have to draw up a risk management plan for the offender. After sentencing, the offender is subject to a process of risk assessment and risk management by the Risk Management Authority through a risk management plan, which includes ways to manage the risks from the offender in prison and, where allowed by risk assessment, through release on licence. Should an offender be released from prison or detention they will be subject to more intensive supervision, treatment, and monitoring.

== Parole ==
Offenders who are in prison as a consequence of an order for lifelong restriction must still have their case for release on licence considered by the Parole Board for Scotland. The Parole Board will sit as the Life Prisoner Tribunal when considering whether or not to grant parole. The Tribunal takes the form of an oral hearing with a legally qualified Member of the Parole Board, and two other Members. The Tribunal will hear evidence from the prisoner (with their legal representative), a representative from the prison, and they will have to consider the risk management plan to understand the degree of risk posed by the prisoner. A prisoner's case can only considered by the Parole Board where the case is referred by the Scottish Ministers.

== Rules of court ==
The Criminal Procedure Rules were modified by Act of Adjournal in 2006 to give effect to:

- A prosecutor's right to request a risk assessment order
- A prosecutor's right to appeal against the imposition of an order for lifelong restriction
- A convict's right to object to the risk assessment order and to an order for lifelong restriction
