= Indefinite imprisonment =

Type of prison sentence

Indefinite imprisonment or indeterminate imprisonment is the imposition of a sentence of imprisonment with no definite period of time set during sentencing. It was imposed by certain nations in the past, before the drafting of the United Nations Convention against Torture (CAT) in 1984. The length of an indefinite imprisonment was determined during imprisonment based on the inmate's conduct. The inmate could have been returned to society or be kept in prison for life.

In theory, an indefinite prison sentence could be very short, or it could be a life sentence if no decision is made after sentencing to lift the term. In many cases, either a minimum term is imposed or the maximum that can be served is the maximum allowable by law in the jurisdiction for the particular offense.

== Rationale ==
The main reason for imposing indefinite (as opposed to fixed) sentences is to protect the community. An offender can then be kept behind bars until it is determined the offender would not pose any danger to society.

In some places, indefinite sentences have been around for a long time. In other jurisdictions, they have been introduced more recently.

== Australia ==
Queensland's Dangerous Prisoners (Sexual Offenders) Act 2003 authorised the continued detention of sex offenders who had served their term of imprisonment. The other Australian states followed with similar legislation.

=== Tasmania ===
An offender who is at least 17 years of age and has been convicted of at least two violent or sexual offences can be declared a dangerous offender and detained indeterminately. A judge must consider the potential of future harm that could be caused by the offender, the circumstances of the offenses, medical and psychiatric opinion, and any other matters of relevance. The decision passed by the court is not reviewable; the indeterminate sentence(s) commence upon the expiration of any determinate sentence imposed, and release is only by way of an order from the Supreme Court.

Seven Tasmanian offenders are serving one or more consecutive sentences of indefinite imprisonment as of July 2012.

=== Western Australia ===
The Criminal Code Act 1913 (WA) and the Crimes (Serious and Repeat Offenders) Act 1992 (WA) contain provisions for the indeterminate incarceration of youths and adults convicted of particular offenses.

The indeterminate sentence(s) commence upon the expiration of any determinate sentence imposed, and are reviewed every three years after that, effectively giving a minimum term of the determinate sentence plus three years. Release is through a Supreme Court Order or at the discretion of the Governor.

The longest effective minimum term imposed is 30 years, being served by paedophile Mark Pendleton (an indefinite sentence to commence on the expiration of 27 years) for sexual offences committed against girls between 1977 and 1996, possessing child exploitation material in his cell, and being the ringleader of a conspiracy with fellow paedophiles to abuse children in Thailand.

Another paedophile, Christian Michael Roach, was sentenced to three consecutive indefinite terms with an effective minimum term of 30 years in 2008 (the indefinite sentences to commence on the expiration of 27 years) for drugging and sexually abusing nine young women and girls between 1987 and 1999, and the manslaughter of one of them, but Roach hanged himself in his cell ten days after being sentenced.

=== Northern Territory and South Australia ===
The Criminal Code Act 1983 (NT) and the Sentencing Act 2017 (SA) allow for the indefinite incarceration of a person who is determined to be a habitual criminal and/or incapable of controlling sexual urges.

In South Australia, the indefinite sentence(s) commence upon the expiration of any determinate sentence imposed, and are reviewed every three years after that, effectively giving a minimum term of the determinate sentence plus three years. Release is only by way of an order from the Supreme Court.

In the Northern Territory, a prisoner serving one or more indefinite sentence(s) has a nominal sentence set at 70% of the sentence that would have been imposed if the prisoner were not declared dangerous, 20 years (25 years in some circumstances) if the sentence imposed would have been one or more consecutive sentences of life imprisonment, or any other term as is fixed by the court.

The indeterminate sentence must be reviewed by the court when the nominal sentence has expired and every three years afterward.

=== Australian Capital Territory, Queensland and Victoria ===
The Sentencing Act 2005 (ACT), the Dangerous Prisoners (Sexual Offenders) Act 2003 (Qld), and the Sentencing Act 1991 (Vic) concern habitual offenders.

An offender can be incarcerated indefinitely if there is a high probability because of the offender's character, nature of their offense, psychiatric evidence as to the danger of the defendant, and any other relevant circumstances that the offender poses a serious threat to the community. The indeterminate sentence must be reviewed by the court when the nominal sentence has expired and every three years afterward.

The minimum nominal sentence that can be imposed is ten years, but the sentencing judge can extend that if the prisoner's criminal history or the nature of the prisoner's offending warrants it.

The longest nominal sentence imposed on one or more sentences of indefinite imprisonment is 30 years, currently being served by serial paedophile Geoffrey Robert Dobbs (Queensland), who pleaded guilty to 124 sexual offences and one count of attempting to pervert the course of justice committed against 63 girls aged between one month and 15 years, including five family members and girls under his care as a teacher and youth leader, between 1972 and 2000.

== Canada ==
In Canada, an inmate classified as a dangerous offender can be given an indefinite prison sentence. That means the offender is at risk for causing a "serious personal injury."

== New Zealand ==
In New Zealand, indefinite imprisonment is called preventive detention and is handed down to individuals aged 18 or over convicted of a qualifying violent or sexual offences if it is likely that the offender will re-offend even if given the maximum term of imprisonment otherwise allowed. Such individuals will not receive parole unless they can demonstrate they no longer pose a threat to the community.

Preventive detention has a minimum period of imprisonment of five years, but the sentencing judge can extend that if the nature of the prisoner's offending or the prisoner's criminal history warrants it.

The longest minimum period of imprisonment on a sentence of preventive detention is one of 28 years, which was given in 1984.

== Singapore ==
In Singapore, Sentence for Enhanced Public Protection or SEPP for short is a severe sentencing regime convicted of extremely heinous crimes like rape, manslaughter, sexual penetration and/or attempted murder which is limited to offenders aged 21 or above at the time of the offence and poses an extremely high risk of reoffending.

SEPP is an indefinite imprisonment which carries a minimum jail term of between 5 and 20 years, remission (a one-third deduction of sentence) is banned. Once minimum term is hit, the offender will undergo annual reviews, if unsuitable for release the offender will be jailed for up to life, if suitable for release, the offender is released on Licence.

This regime was officially introduced on 31 July 2026 and applies to qualifying offences committed on or after this date.

== United Kingdom ==
=== England and Wales ===
Imprisonment for public protection was a form of indefinite sentence that was used in England and Wales from 2005 until 2012, in addition to the traditional life sentence. The imprisonment for public protection sentence was abolished in 2012, but offenders already serving that sentence remained in prison.

=== Scotland ===
In Scotland, the Order for Lifelong Restriction was implemented by the Criminal Justice (Scotland) Act 2003, which gives a judge of the High Court of Justiciary the power to impose a sentence for serious violent and sexual offences, that includes the life imprisonment or detention of the offender. The offender is subject to a process of risk assessment and risk management by the Risk Management Authority through a Risk Management Plan, which includes ways to manage the risks from the offender in prison and, where allowed by risk assessment, through release on licence. Should an offender be released from prison or detention they will be subject to more intensive supervision, treatment, and monitoring.

== United States ==
Some U.S. states have various forms of indefinite sentencing, and many have effective indeterminate sentencing with evaluation-based parole.

The U.S. federal prison system does not allow parole for any crimes committed after 1987: therefore, a sentence of life imprisonment means that the prisoner will be incarcerated for the remainder of their life.

Indeterminate sentencing existed in every U.S. state from the 1930s to the mid-1970s. The Model Penal Code, developed in the 1950s, focused on offenders' treatment needs rather than on retribution: generous amounts of good conduct time could be awarded by prison officials.

By the mid-1970s, indeterminate sentencing was under attack, as arguments were made that racial and other invidious biases influenced officials, that rehabilitative treatment programs were ineffective, and that broad, standardless discretion denied constitutional due process and permitted undue leniency that undermined the deterrent effects of sanctions.

Federal supervised release is also sometimes cited as an example of indeterminate sentencing.

== See also ==
- At His Majesty's pleasure
- Indefinite detention without trial
- Three-strikes law
- Involuntary commitment
