= William Plotnikov =

Canadian-Russian boxer

William Plotnikov (May 3, 1989 in Megion, Khanty-Mansi Autonomous Okrug – July 14, 2012) was a Russian Canadian boxer and Canadian citizen who converted to Islam, joined the Islamist insurgent organization Caucasus Emirate in the Russian republic of Dagestan and was killed there in combat by Russian government forces. According to unconfirmed media reports, Plotnikov might have been a contact of the Boston Marathon bombings suspect Tamerlan Tsarnaev via social media and perhaps when Tsarnaev unsuccessfully attempted to join the insurgency in Dagestan as well, before returning to the United States after Plotnikov was killed.

== Biography ==
Plotnikov immigrated to Canada in 2005 from Russia at the age of 15, along with his Christian family from the Western Siberian town of Megion in Tyumen Oblast. He was born in the Russian Soviet Federative Socialist Republic. His father Vitaly, an athlete himself, introduced his son to boxing when William was a 9-year-old. William then twice won the Russian youth championships. His parents decided to move to the West to make sure he got a good education and because of their concerns about local crime groups attracting Russian athletes.

The Plotnikovs became Canadian citizens in 2008. The move, however, was difficult for their son, who struggled to adapt to his new life in Toronto. He had left his friends behind only to find himself alienated by Western teenage culture as well as by the alcoholism of many members of Canada's Russian diaspora. At the Thornhill boxing club, William managed to impress Boris Gitman, a coach at the European Boxing School, who thought William, while not physically strong, was very talented and "would be a good Olympian." He won silver medals at the 2006 Brampton Cup and at the 2007 provincial championships in Windsor, and won a club bout at Exhibition Place. He also became interested in other martial arts, such as jujitsu and Thai boxing. Gitman said about him: "He wasn't comfortable here; he was looking for something and I don't think he found it here."

After graduating from high school, Plotnikov joined Seneca College and traveled to other countries with the school's international tourism program. He also began reflecting about human existence, searching for an answer in holy books of the three Abrahamic religions. He took interest in Islam around 2008 and in 2009 he visited an unknown Toronto mosque, where his father said his son came into contact with "a mullah who had very radical views." Soon, Plotnikov adopted and observed strict Muslim customs, isolated himself from his friends and cut off most communication with his family. In September 2010, Plotnikov disappeared, leaving a note that he was going to France for Ramadan. The Royal Canadian Mounted Police had been looking for William as a missing person for almost two years by then.

After several months, his parents found out he was living in Moscow with a friend from Toronto. Later, he traveled to the Russian republic of Dagestan and took a residence in the mostly ethnic Kumyk village of Utamysh, Kayakentsky District, located about 70 km south of the capital Makhachkala. His concerned father called the Russian Ministry of Internal Affairs, and the police subsequently raided the house where William stayed and briefly detained and interrogated him. Upon his release, William then returned to Moscow, but soon made his way back to Dagestan and joined an armed Islamist rebel group based in the forested mountain range near Utamysh, becoming known as "The Canadian" (Kanadets). His father recognised him in the photos posted on the Internet in which William could be seen posing with other fighters.

Before midnight of July 13, 2012, a force of Dagestani militants was ambushed and surrounded at a farm outside Utamysh by Russian special forces that had been tipped off by an informant. In an overnight battle, during which the farm was destroyed by artillery fire, at least one Russian serviceman and seven militants were killed, including two local guerrilla group leaders (the Sergokala group's Islam Magomedov and the Izberbash group's Arsen Magomedov) and William Plotnikov. Insurgency website Kavkaz Center labeled Plotnikov a "shahid" (martyr). According to National Post, he "is believed to be the first Canadian convert to die fighting in the name of jihad." Plotnikov was also the second known Canadian to be killed in the North Caucasus conflict; in 2004, Russian forces said they killed a Canadian citizen named Rudwan Khalil in Chechnya. His father flew to Dagestan and Russian authorities agreed to release his son's body, which he then buried in Utamysh according to local Muslim traditions.

== Alleged links to Tamerlan Tsarnaev ==
Plotnikov came under international scrutiny after an investigative article in Russia's liberal opposition investigative newspaper Novaya Gazeta, citing their sources in the security forces, wrote that Plotnikov was one of two local contacts (the other one, an ethnic Kumyk-Palestinian teenager named Mahmud Nidal was killed by the police in May 2012) of the Boston Marathon bombings suspect and fellow Russian émigré boxer Tamerlan Tsarnaev, who had allegedly sought to join the insurgency in Dagestan after returning there from the United States in 2012, taking a residence in Makhachkala. According to Novaya, the two had previously communicated via a website associated with the World Assembly of Muslim Youth. After Plotnikov was detained, the security services, using "a wide range of special equipment", allegedly extracted from him a list of people he communicated with; one of the names belonged to Tsarnaev. Tsarnaev had previously visited his aunt in Toronto where Plotnikov lived. With both of his alleged contacts in the insurgency dead, Tsarnaev left Russia just two days after Plotnikov was killed.

Vitaly Plotnikov said he was unaware of any contacts between his son and Tsarnaev and denied any connection to the Boston bombings. Dagestan's interior minister Abdurashid Magomedov said through a spokesman that Tsarnaev "did not have contact with the [Islamist] underground during his visit." The Jamestown Foundation regarded Novaya report's mention of Tsarnaev's visit to Toronto as "also a stretch and likely to mislead a casual reader."

American investigators in Russia, however, took interest in a possible correlation between the dates of Plotnikov's death and of Tsarnaev's sudden return to the United States. It was also noted in the media that Plotnikov and Tsarnaev's lives were parallel in many respects. It was further reported that both Tsarnaev and Plotnikov were members of the Internet forum Sherdog, as was Ibragim Todashev, a Chechen American MMA fighter from Florida who had been acquainted with Tsarnaev and who was fatally shot by an FBI agent during his questioning on 22 May 2013.
