= Dzhokhar Tsarnaev =

Boston Marathon bomber (born 1993)

- Джохар Царнаев; Джовхӏар Царнаев
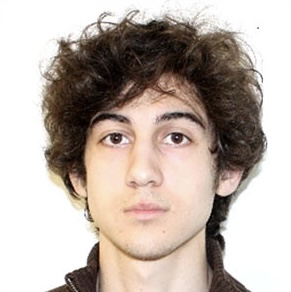
- Passport photo of Dzhokhar Tsarnaev released during the 2013 manhunt
- Born: Dzhokhar Anzorovich Tsarnaev; July 22, 1993 (age 33); Tokmok, Kyrgyzstan or Dagestan, Russia
- Other name: Jahar Tsarnaev
- Citizenship: United States
- Education: Cambridge Rindge and Latin School; University of Massachusetts Dartmouth (incomplete degree)
- Known for: Boston Marathon bombing
- Parents: Anzor Tsarnaev (father); Zubeidat Tsarnaeva (mother)
- Relatives: Tamerlan Tsarnaev (brother) (deceased); Ruslan Tsarni (uncle)
- Status: Incarcerated at ADX Florence
- Convictions: 30 counts (Note: Use of a weapon of mass destruction resulting in death (2 counts); Use of a weapon of mass destruction (4 counts); Conspiracy to use a weapon of mass destruction resulting in death; Bombing a place of public use resulting in death (2 counts); Conspiracy to bomb a place of public use resulting in death; Maliciously destroying property resulting in death (2 counts); Conspiracy to maliciously destroy property resulting in death; Carjacking resulting in serious bodily injury; Use of a firearm during a crime of violence resulting in death (9 counts); Use of a firearm during a crime of violence (6 counts); Interfering with commerce by threats or violence)
- Penalty: Death

Details
- Killed: 6 (including co-conspirator and a police officer who died from injuries in 2014)
- Injured: 500+

Dzhokhar Anzorovich Tsarnaev (born July 22, 1993) is an American domestic terrorist and mass murderer. Along with his older brother Tamerlan Tsarnaev, he planted pressure cooker bombs near the finish line of the Boston Marathon on April 15, 2013. The bombs detonated, killing three people and injuring hundreds of others.

During his early childhood, Tsarnaev lived in Kyrgyzstan and in the Russian Republic of Dagestan. He moved with his parents to the United States in 2002 and later became a U.S. citizen. Tsarnaev and his family settled in Cambridge, Massachusetts. In 2011, he graduated from Cambridge Rindge and Latin School and began attending the University of Massachusetts Dartmouth. He had a brother, Tamerlan Tsarnaev, and has two sisters.

On April 18, 2013, the Federal Bureau of Investigation (FBI) released images of two men, stated that they were suspects in the bombing, and asked the public for help in identifying them. The images depicted Dzhokhar and Tamerlan Tsarnaev. Later that evening, the Tsarnaev brothers shot and killed MIT Police Officer Sean Collier and then committed a carjacking. During an ensuing shootout with police, both brothers were injured; Tamerlan Tsarnaev was shot by the police and run over by Dzhokhar and subsequently died from his injuries. On the evening of April 19, after thousands of police officers conducted a manhunt in Watertown, Massachusetts, Dzhokhar Tsarnaev was found hiding in a boat in the backyard of a residence. He was shot and taken into custody. During an interrogation, Tsarnaev acknowledged his role in the Boston Marathon bombing and added that he and his brother had also intended to detonate explosives in New York City's Times Square.

Tsarnaev was tried and convicted of 30 counts and was sentenced to death. His death sentence was vacated on appeal in July 2020, but the U.S. Supreme Court reversed that decision in March 2022. As of 2025, he is being held on death row at ADX Florence federal supermax prison in Colorado.

== Early life, family, and education ==
Dzhokhar Anzorovich Tsarnaev (Note: Russian: Джоха́р Анзо́рович Царна́ев [dʐɐˈxar ɐnˈzorəvʲɪtɕ tsɐrˈna(j)ɪf]; Chechen: Царнаев Анзор-кIант ДжовхӀар or ЖовхӀар Carnayev Anzor-khant Dƶovhar; (Kyrgyz: Жохар Анзор уулу Царнаев, Jokhar Anzor uulu Tsarnaev)) was born on July 22, 1993 to Anzor Tsarnaev, a Chechen, and Zubeidat Tsarnaeva, an Avar. His older brother, Tamerlan, was born on October 21, 1986. In the years following World War II, the Tsarnaev family had been forcibly moved from Chechnya by the Soviet Union to the Soviet republic of Kyrgyzstan. Anzor and Zubeidat moved peripatetically across Central Asia during the late 20th century. In 1986, they were married in the Kalmyk Autonomous Soviet Socialist Republic, and Tamerlan was born there the next day. Dzhokhar Tsarnaev was born in either Kyrgyzstan or Dagestan, in the Russian Federation. He has two sisters. The family raised their children as Muslims; after the Boston Marathon bombing, a relative described Anzor Tsarnaev as a "traditional Muslim" who objected to extremism.

Tsarnaev spent the first years of his life in Kyrgyzstan. In 2001, the family moved to Makhachkala, Dagestan, in the Russian Federation. In April 2002, Tsarnaev and his parents went to the United States on a 90-day tourist visa. Anzor Tsarnaev successfully applied for asylum, citing fears of deadly persecution due to his ties to Chechnya. Tamerlan Tsarnaev had been left in the care of his uncle Ruslan in Kyrgyzstan and arrived in the U.S. about two years later. The parents then filed for asylum for their four children, who received "derivative asylum status". They settled on Norfolk Street in Cambridge, Massachusetts.

The family "was in constant transition" for the next decade. Anzor Tsarnaev and Zubeidat Tsarnaeva both received welfare benefits. Anzor worked as a backyard mechanic and Zubeidat worked as a cosmetologist until she lost her job for refusing to work in a business that served men.

Tsarnaev attended Cambridgeport Elementary School and Cambridge Community Charter School's middle school program. At Cambridge Rindge and Latin School, a public high school, he was an avid wrestler and a Greater Boston League winter all-star. He graduated from high school in 2011 and the city of Cambridge awarded him a $2,500 scholarship.

Neighbor Larry Aaronson described Tsarnaev as "a lovely, lovely kid" who was grateful to be in the United States. According to Rolling Stone, Cambridge residents saw Tsarnaev—known to his friends as "Jahar"—as "a beautiful, tousle-haired boy with a gentle demeanor". Tamerlan Tsarnaev's boxing coach said Dzhokhar Tsarnaev was "like a puppy dog, following his older brother".

In March 2007, the Tsarnaev family was granted legal permanent residence. Tsarnaev would become a U.S. citizen while in college. Zubeidat Tsarnaev eventually became a U.S. citizen as well, while Tamerlan Tsarnaev was unable to naturalize because an investigation held up the citizenship process.

=== College years ===
In 2011, Dzhokhar Tsarnaev contacted Brian Glyn Williams, a professor at the University of Massachusetts Dartmouth, who taught a class about Chechen history, expressing his interest in the topic. Tsarnaev enrolled at the University of Massachusetts Dartmouth in September 2011.

Tsarnaev was described as "normal" and popular by some fellow students. Others described him as "creepy." His friends said he sometimes smoked marijuana, liked hip-hop, and did not talk about politics. He also sold marijuana. Many friends and other acquaintances at first found it inconceivable that he could be one of the two bombers, calling it "completely out of his character". He was not perceived as foreign, spoke American English without an accent, was sociable, and was described by peers as "[not] 'them'. He was 'us'. He was Cambridge."

On the Russian-language social-networking site VK, Tsarnaev described his "world view" as "Islam" and his personal priorities as "career and money". He posted links to Islamic websites, links to videos of fighters in the Syrian civil war, and links to pages advocating independence for Chechnya. Tsarnaev was also active on Twitter. According to The Economist, he seemed "to have been much more concerned with sports and cheeseburgers than with religion, at least judging by his Twitter feed"; however, according to The Boston Globe, on the day of the 2012 Boston Marathon, a year before the bombings, a post on Tsarnaev's Twitter feed mentioned a Quran verse often used by radical Muslim clerics and propagandists.

At the time of the bombing, Dzhokhar was a sophomore living in the UMass Dartmouth's Pine Dale Hall dorm. He was struggling academically; his GPA was 1.09, and he had received seven failing grades over three semesters. He changed majors several times, and at the time of his arrest was registered as an Arts & Literature undergraduate with no declared major. He also owed $20,000 to the university.

== 2013 Boston Marathon bombing and aftermath ==
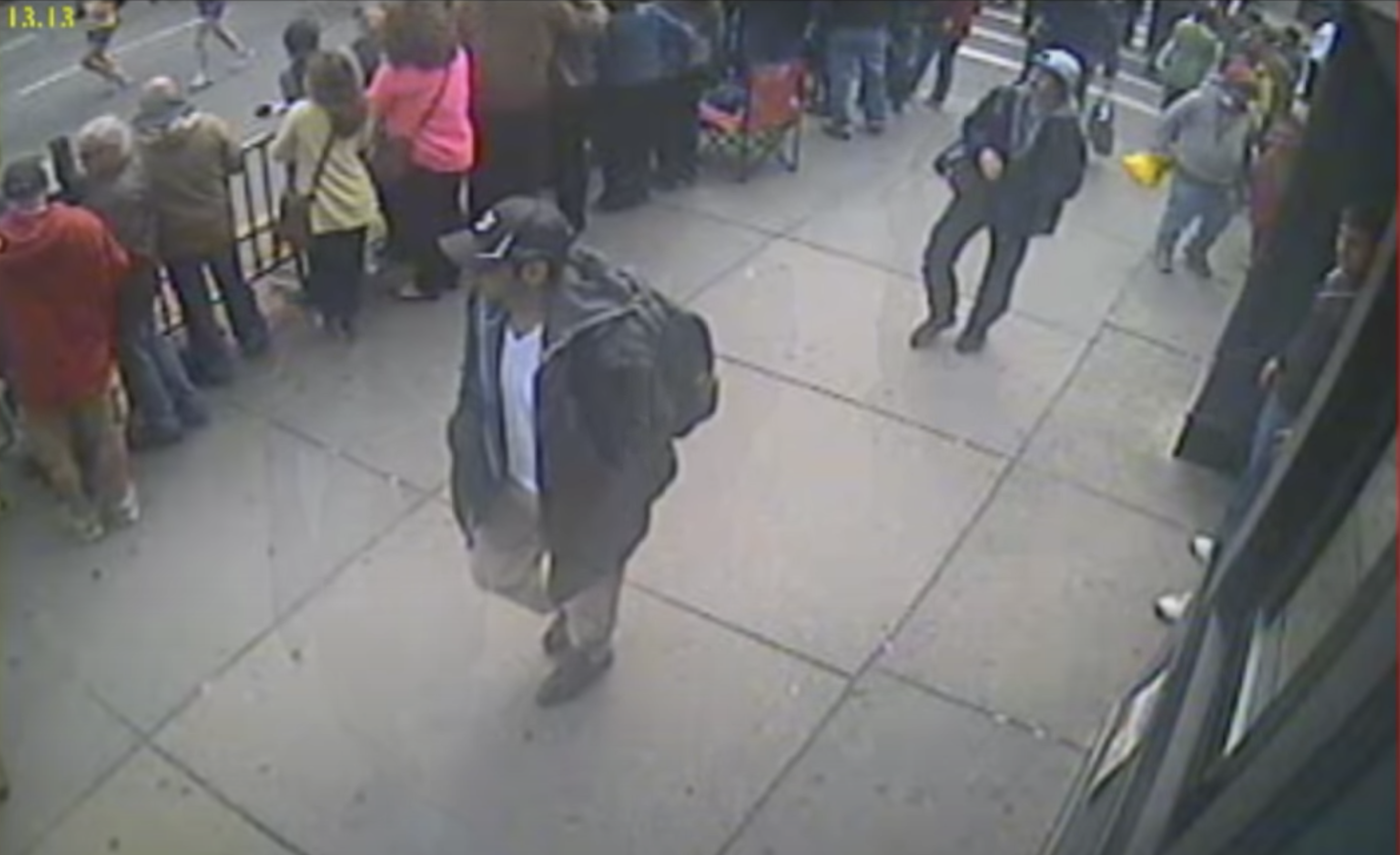
Tamerlan Tsarnaev (front) and Dzhokhar Tsarnaev (rear) moments before the bombing

The 117th annual Boston Marathon was run on Patriots' Day, April 15, 2013. Dzhokhar Tsarnaev and his brother Tamerlan Tsarnaev used pressure cooker bombs to commit the Boston Marathon bombing on that day. One bomb was placed at the Boston Marathon finish line, while the other was placed outside the Forum restaurant. The bombs were detonated at 2:49 pm. The bombing killed three people and injured hundreds of others.

Tsarnaev continued to tweet after the bombings, and sent a tweet telling the people of Boston to "stay safe". He returned to his university after the bombing and remained there until April 18, when the FBI released pictures of him and Tamerlan at the marathon. During that time, he used the college gym and slept in his dorm; his friends said that he partied with them after the attacks and looked "relaxed".

=== Manhunt and additional crimes ===
At 5:00 p.m. on April 18, 2013, the FBI released images of two Boston Marathon bombing suspects carrying backpacks and requested the public's help in identifying them. The FBI-released images depicted Dzhokhar and Tamerlan Tsarnaev. Hours after the FBI released photos of the two suspects in the bombing, Tamerlan and Dzhokhar Tsarnaev visited their family's apartment in Cambridge. There, they obtained five improvised explosive devices (IEDs), ammunition, a semiautomatic handgun, and a machete. The two brothers then drove to the Massachusetts Institute of Technology.

On April 18, 2013, at 10:25 p.m., the Tsarnaev brothers ambushed Sean A. Collier of the Massachusetts Institute of Technology Police Department and shot him six times. Collier died from his injuries and was found in his vehicle later that evening. The shooting occurred as part of a failed attempt to steal Collier's gun. The brothers then traveled to the Boston neighborhood of Allston. There, the brothers carjacked an SUV and robbed its owner, Dun Meng, who said he managed to escape when the Tsarnaevs became momentarily distracted in the process of refueling the car at a cash-only gas station. Meng fled to another nearby gas station and contacted the police. Police were then able to track the location of the SUV through Meng's cellphone and the SUV's anti-theft tracking device.

In the early hours of April 19, police found the brothers, and a shootout ensued in Watertown. During the shootout, the brothers threw bombs at responding officers. Both brothers were wounded, with Tamerlan being shot several times. Dzhokhar escaped by driving the stolen SUV toward the officers who were arresting his brother. He drove over his brother, dragging him under the SUV about 30 feet (9 m). Tamerlan later died at a nearby hospital of gunshot wounds and blunt force trauma. Dzhokhar drove off, but abandoned the car about 1/2 mile (800 m) away and then fled on foot. A Massachusetts Bay Transportation Authority Police officer was critically injured in the course of Dzhokhar Tsarnaev's escape. A manhunt involving thousands of police officers from several nearby towns, as well as state police, FBI, and SWAT teams, searched numerous homes and properties in Watertown. Images of squad cars and large black armored vehicles crowding the side streets, as well as videos of residents being led out of their homes at gunpoint, soon flooded social media. The Boston metropolitan area was effectively shut down all day on April 19.

After Tsarnaev's name was published in connection with the bombings, his uncle Ruslan Tsarni, who lives in Montgomery Village, Maryland, pleaded with Tsarnaev through the news media to turn himself in "and ask for forgiveness". Tsarni added that Tsarnaev had shamed the family and the Chechen honor code.

=== Arrest and detention ===
On the evening of April 19, Tsarnaev was discovered wounded in a boat in a Watertown backyard, less than 1/4 mile (400 m) from where he abandoned the SUV. David Henneberry, the owner of the boat, had noticed that the cover on the boat was loose. When the "shelter in place" order was lifted, he went outside to investigate. He lifted the tarpaulin, saw a bloodied man, retreated into his house and called 911. Three Boston police officers responded and were soon joined by Waltham police. Tsarnaev's presence and movements were verified through a forward looking infrared thermal imaging device in a State Police helicopter. After he was observed pushing up at the tarp on the boat, Boston police began firing but were stopped by the superintendent on the scene. Though there were initial reports of a shootout between police and Tsarnaev, and that Tsarnaev had attempted suicide via gunshot, officials later said that he was unarmed when captured.

In an image broadcast on the night of the arrest, Tsarnaev was shown stepping out of the boat. Tsarnaev was "hauled down to the grassy ground" by SWAT officer Jeff Campbell and handcuffed by SWAT officer Saro Thompson.

Tsarnaev, who had been shot and was bleeding badly from wounds to his left ear, neck and thigh, was taken into federal custody. He was transported to Beth Israel Deaconess Medical Center in Boston, where he was treated in the intensive-care unit. He was in serious but stable condition. According to one of the nurses, he cried for two days straight after waking up. According to a doctor that treated him, Tsarnaev had a skull-base fracture; injuries to the middle ear, a portion of his C1 vertebra, the pharynx, and the mouth; a soft tissue injury; and a small vascular injury.

=== Interrogation ===
Tsarnaev was questioned by a federal High-Value Interrogation Group, a special counterterrorism group composed of members of the FBI, CIA and Department of Defense that was created to question high-value detainees. Questioned without being provided a Miranda warning, Tsarnaev wrote his answers to the team's questions in a notebook, as a tracheostomy rendered him unable to speak.

After initial interrogations, officials announced that it was clear the attack was religiously motivated, but that so far there was no evidence that the brothers had any ties to Islamic terror organizations. Officials also said that Dzhokhar acknowledged his role in the bombings and told interrogators that he and Tamerlan were motivated by extremist Islamic beliefs and the U.S. wars in Afghanistan and Iraq to carry out the bombing. Dzhokhar admitted during questioning that he and his brother were planning to detonate explosives in New York City's Times Square. The brothers formed the plan spontaneously during the April 18 carjacking, but things went awry after the vehicle ran low on gas and they forced the driver to stop at a gas station, where he escaped. Dzhokhar says he was inspired by online videos from imam Anwar al-Awlaki, who also inspired Faisal Shahzad, who attempted a car bombing in 2010 in Times Square.

Investigators found no evidence that Tsarnaev was involved in any jihadist activities, and, according to The Wall Street Journal, came to believe that unlike his brother Tamerlan, Dzhokhar "was never truly radicalized". Examinations of his computers did not reveal frequent visits to jihad websites, expressions of violent Islamist rhetoric or other suspicious activities. Some law enforcement officials told the WSJ that Tsarnaev "better fit[s] the psychological profile of an ordinary criminal than a committed terrorist".

During CBS This Morning on May 16, 2013, CBS News senior correspondent John Miller said he had been told that while Tsarnaev was hiding in the boat, he wrote a note claiming responsibility for the April 15 attack during the marathon. The note was scribbled with a pen on one of the inside walls of the cabin and said the bombings were payback for the U.S. military actions in Afghanistan and Iraq, and referred to the Boston victims as collateral damage, the same way Muslims have been in the American-led wars. He continued, "When you attack one Muslim, you attack all Muslims." He also said he did not mourn his brother's death because now Tamerlan was a martyr in paradise and that he (Dzhokhar) expected to join him in paradise. Miller's sources said the wall the note was written on had multiple bullet holes in it from the shots that were fired into the boat by police. According to Miller, the note painted a clear picture of the brothers' motive "consistent with what he told investigators while he was in custody". Photographs of the note were eventually released by prosecutors in March 2015.

On April 26, Tsarnaev was transported by U.S. Marshals to the Federal Medical Center, Devens, a United States federal prison near Boston for male inmates requiring specialized or long-term medical or mental health care. He was held in solitary confinement and restricted to one three-page letter and one telephone call per week.

== Criminal proceedings and conviction ==
=== Indictment ===
On April 22, Tsarnaev was charged via a complaint with "using and conspiring to use a weapon of mass destruction resulting in death" and with "malicious destruction of properties resulting in death", both in connection with the Boston Marathon attacks. He was read his Miranda rights at his bedside by a federal magistrate judge of the United States District Court for the District of Massachusetts, nodded his head to answer the judge's questions, and answered "no" when asked whether he could afford a lawyer. After being read his Miranda rights, Tsarnaev stopped talking and declined to continue to cooperate with the investigation.

In June 2013, Tsarnaev was indicted by a federal grand jury on 30 charges. Some of the charges were death-penalty eligible. Tsarnaev's arraignment for 30 charges, including four counts of murder, occurred on July 10, 2013, in federal court in Boston before U.S. magistrate judge Marianne Bowler. It was his first public court appearance. He pleaded not guilty to all 30 counts against him, which included using and conspiring to use a weapon of mass destruction resulting in death.

Middlesex County prosecutors also brought criminal charges against Tsarnaev for the murder of Sean Collier. A surveillance camera at MIT captured the brothers approaching Collier's car from behind.

Prosecutors initially argued that Tsarnaev's pre-Miranda statements should be admissible, invoking Miranda's public safety exception. However, the exception was not considered by the court because the prosecutors later decided not to use those statements in their case.

On January 30, 2014, United States Attorney General Eric Holder announced that the federal government would seek the death penalty against Tsarnaev. In January 2015, CNN reported that plea negotiations had failed when the government refused to rule out the possibility of the death penalty.

=== Trial ===
The trial began on January 5, 2015. Tsarnaev was prosecuted by assistant U.S. attorneys William Weinreb and Aloke Chakravarty, of the Anti-Terrorism and National Security Unit of the U.S. Attorney's Office in Boston. His defense team included federal public defender Miriam Conrad, William Fick, and Judy Clarke. Tsarnaev pleaded not guilty to all thirty charges laid against him. Judge George O'Toole presided over the trial. Tsarnaev's attorney, Judy Clarke, admitted in her opening statement that Tsarnaev committed the acts in question but sought to avert the death penalty by asserting that his brother Tamerlan had influenced and manipulated him. Counter-terrorism expert Matthew Levitt gave testimony in March 2015.

On April 8, 2015, Tsarnaev was found guilty on all thirty counts of the indictment. The charges of usage of a weapon of mass destruction resulting in death, in addition to aiding and abetting, made Tsarnaev eligible for the death penalty.

=== Sentencing ===
During the sentencing phase of the proceedings, the jury heard from victims of the bombing and Tsarnaev's friends and relatives. (Note: The state of Massachusetts eliminated the death penalty for state crimes in 1984. However, because Tsarnaev was tried by the federal government, he is eligible for execution.) Tsarnaev, who had displayed little emotion throughout his trial, appeared to weep when his relatives testified on his behalf on May 4, 2015. Bill and Denise Richard, parents of Martin Richard (the youngest of the three killed in the bombings and one of the two people killed by Dzhokhar's bomb, the other person being Chinese exchange student Lingzi Lu), urged against a death sentence for Tsarnaev. They stated that the lengthy appeals period would force them to continually relive that day, and would rather see Tsarnaev spend life in prison without parole (possibility of release), and waive his right to appeal.

On May 15, 2015, the jury sentenced Tsarnaev to death by lethal injection on six of 17 capital counts. According to the verdict forms completed by the jurors, three of 12 believed that Tsarnaev had taken part in the attack under his brother's influence; two believed that he had been remorseful for his actions; two believed that Tamerlan, not Dzhokhar, had shot and killed Officer Collier; three believed that his friends still care about him; one believed that Tsarnaev's mother, Zubeidat Tsarnaeva, was to be blamed for the brothers' actions; one believed that Tsarnaev would never be violent again in prison.

On June 24, 2015, Tsarnaev faced his living victims in court as his death sentence was formally delivered. Victims and their families presented impact statements to the court. Tsarnaev, who had been silent throughout his month-long trial, admitted to carrying out the bombings along with his brother; he apologized to the injured and the bereaved. The New York Daily News reported that "the mass murderer's mea culpa capped a dramatic day during which 25 people who lost loved ones and limbs took turns verbally slamming Tsarnaev".

The Department of Justice investigative and prosecution team received the Attorney General's David Margolis Award for Exceptional Service from Attorney General Loretta E. Lynch on November 10, 2016.

=== Imprisonment ===
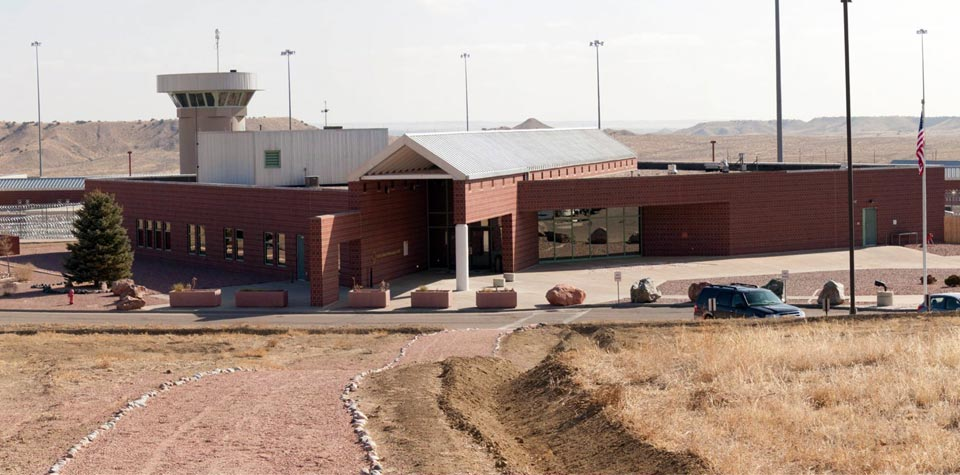
ADX Florence, the prison housing Tsarnaev

The following morning, on June 25, 2015, Tsarnaev was transferred from Federal Medical Center, Devens to the United States Penitentiary, Florence High in Colorado. As of July 17, 2015, Tsarnaev had been transferred to United States Penitentiary Florence Administrative Maximum Facility (ADX Florence). A Federal Bureau of Prisons (BOP) spokesperson stated that "unique security management requirements" caused the agency to place Tsarnaev in Colorado instead of United States Penitentiary, Terre Haute, Indiana, where male death-row inmates are normally held.

According to The Guardian, in June 2016, Al-Qaeda leader Ayman al-Zawahiri issued a threat to the United States, warning of the "gravest consequences" should Tsarnaev be harmed.

In December 2024, when Joe Biden announced commutations for the death sentences of 37 out of 40 federal death row inmates to life imprisonment without the possibility of parole, he excluded Tsarnaev, along with Dylann Roof, who committed the 2015 Charleston church shooting, and Robert Gregory Bowers, who committed the 2018 Pittsburgh synagogue shooting, because of their convictions for either terrorism or hate-motivated mass murder–related crimes.

As of 2026, Tsarnaev continues to be held on death row at ADX Florence federal supermax prison in Colorado.

=== Appeals ===
Tsarnaev appealed his sentence on the grounds that the trial should not have been held in Boston, that there were errors in jury selection and that the judge improperly excluded evidence that Tamerlan Tsarnaev and another man, Ibragim Todashev, committed a prior triple murder in Waltham on September 11, 2011, arguing that such evidence would suggest that Dzhokhar Tsarnaev acted under the influence of Tamerlan Tsarnaev and was possibly fearful of what would happen to him if he refused.

The appeal was heard by a three-judge panel of the First Circuit on December 12, 2019. On July 31, 2020, the First Circuit overturned the death sentence and three of the other convictions, agreeing that the judge failed to determine how much the potential jurors had been aware of the event during jury selection, and ordered a retrial with a new jury for the penalty phase of his trial. Tsarnaev remained in prison for multiple life sentences carried by the other uncontested convictions. U.S. Circuit Judge O. Rogeriee Thompson, who wrote the opinion, clarified the ruling of the court. She stated, "Make no mistake: Dzhokhar will spend his remaining days locked up in prison, with the only matter remaining being whether he will die by execution."

On March 22, 2021, the Supreme Court agreed to consider an appeal from the Department of Justice, and on October 13, 2021, the Department of Justice presented arguments in favor of reinstating the death penalty for Tsarnaev. On March 4, 2022, in a 6–3 decision penned by Justice Clarence Thomas, the Supreme Court held that the First Circuit had improperly vacated Tsarnaev's death sentence. The Court reversed the First Circuit's decision, reinstating the death penalty. The Court ruled that Tsarnaev had received a fair trial, rejecting arguments that "trial judge erred in barring certain questions to prospective jurors, and in blocking evidence of his brother Tamerlan's role in a prior triple murder". U.S. Attorney for Massachusetts Rachael Rollins commented, "'Legal rulings don't erase trauma and pain. Our focus today, and always, is on the hundreds of families that were deeply impacted and traumatized by this horrific act of domestic terrorism'".

Tsarnaev asked the First Circuit Court of Appeals to consider four constitutional claims that had not been considered by the Supreme Court. On January 10, 2023, the First Circuit heard the matter. Tsarnaev's attorneys argued that jurors in the case had lied about prior discussions of the case on Twitter and Facebook. The jurors, the attorneys say, claimed to have never discussed the case on social media, whereas the attorneys say the jurors actually did participate in discussions showing a strong bias against Tsarnaev. Tsarnaev's attorneys argued this lack of disclosure should have disqualified the jurors from serving. In March 2024, the First Circuit ruled that the trial judge had not adequately investigated the claims of juror bias, and sent the case back to the trial court with instructions for the trial judge to investigate the defense's claims and determine whether Tsarnaev's death sentence should stand. Tsarnaev subsequently requested that District Court Judge George O'Toole should be recused from deciding the juror-bias issue because comments Judge O'Toole made on a podcast allegedly showed bias against Tsarnaev, but in July 2025 a 3-judge panel of the First Circuit Court of Appeals rejected that argument and ruled that Judge O'Toole should stay on the case. In August 2025, Tsarnaev requested that the full Court of Appeals reconsider that decision en banc. The First Circuit Court of Appeals denied the request on December 18, 2025.

== Media coverage ==
Image of Tsarnaev on the cover of Rolling Stone

According to Rachel Simmons of the Girls Leadership Institute, the initial media portrayal of Tsarnaev "'was somewhat sympathetic, painting him as a teenager who was taken advantage of by a brutish older brother'". Following Tsarnaev's arrest, a cadre of supporters—many of them female—insisted that he was innocent.

Tsarnaev was the subject of a cover story published in the August 2013 issue of Rolling Stone. The story is entitled "The Bomber: How a Popular, Promising Student Was Failed by His Family, Fell into Radical Islam and Became a Monster." The magazine drew heavy criticism for the photo of Tsarnaev on the issue's cover. According to Boston, "critics believe that the cover glamorizes Tsarnaev, depicting him as a kind of rock 'n roll outlaw rather than a terrorist who has been charged with killing four people and seriously wounding hundreds of others". Boston Mayor Tom Menino wrote that the cover "rewards a terrorist with celebrity treatment." Massachusetts State Police sergeant Sean Murphy said that "glamorizing the face of terror is not just insulting to the family members of those killed in the line of duty; it also could be an incentive to those who may be unstable to do something to get their face on the cover of Rolling Stone magazine". The New York Times used the same photo on their front page in May 2013, but did not draw criticism. Rolling Stone columnist Matt Taibbi criticized those who took offense at the cover, arguing that they associated Rolling Stone with glamour instead of news, stating that The New York Times did not draw the criticism that Rolling Stone did "because everyone knows the Times is a news organization. Not everyone knows that about Rolling Stone ..."

The editors of Rolling Stone posted the following response:

Our hearts go out to the victims of the Boston Marathon bombing, and our thoughts are always with them and their families. The cover story we are publishing this week falls within the traditions of journalism and Rolling Stone's long-standing commitment to serious and thoughtful coverage of the most important political and cultural issues of our day. The fact that Dzhokhar Tsarnaev is young, and in the same age group as many of our readers, makes it all the more important for us to examine the complexities of this issue and gain a more complete understanding of how a tragedy like this happens. –THE EDITORS

CVS Pharmacy and other retailers announced that they would no longer sell the August 2013 issue of Rolling Stone.

Adweek magazine ranked the cover the "hottest" of the year after it doubled newsstand sales to 120,000.

== See also ==
- Capital punishment by the United States federal government
- Capital punishment in Massachusetts
- List of death row inmates in the United States
