= 2011 Waltham triple murder =

Triple homicide committed in Waltham, Massachusetts

Coordinates: 42°22′36″N 71°13′03″W

- Location: 12 Harding Avenue, Waltham, Massachusetts, U.S.
- Date: Likely September 11, 2011
- Attack type: Near-decapitation
- Weapon: Ice pick or knife
- Deaths: Brendan Mess, age 25; Erik Weissman, age 31; Raphael Teken, age 37
- Accused: Tamerlan Tsarnaev and Ibragim Todashev

A triple homicide was committed in Waltham, Massachusetts, in the United States, on or very near to the evening of September 11, 2011. Brendan Mess, Erik Weissman, and Raphael Teken were murdered in Mess's apartment. All had their throats slit with such great force that they were nearly decapitated. Thousands of dollars' worth of marijuana and money were left covering their mutilated bodies; in all, $5,000 was left in the apartment. The local district attorney said that it appeared that the killer and the victims knew each other, and that the murders were not random.

Tamerlan Tsarnaev, the now-deceased co-perpetrator of the 2013 Boston Marathon bombing, had previously described murder victim Brendan Mess as his best friend, though before Mess was murdered there had been animosity between Tsarnaev and Mess over Mess's "lifestyle". After the bombings and subsequent revelations of Tsarnaev's personal life, the Waltham murders case was reexamined in April 2013 with Tsarnaev as a new suspect. Authorities said Tsarnaev and his younger brother Dzhokhar Tsarnaev may have also been responsible for the triple homicide, that forensic evidence connected them to the scene of the killings, and that their cell phone records placed them in the area. While police in the first investigation said that victims were killed on September 12, The Boston Globe, Boston Herald, and The Wall Street Journal reported that at least one relative of the victims believes that the killings took place on September 11.

In May 2013, Ibragim Todashev, a 27-year-old Chechen native and former mixed martial arts fighter who knew Tamerlan Tsarnaev, was shot and killed in Orlando, Florida, by law enforcement officers who had been interviewing him about the Waltham murders as well as the Boston Marathon bombings. The FBI has alleged that just before he was killed, Todashev made statements implicating both himself and Tamerlan Tsarnaev in the Waltham murders—saying that the initial crime was a drug robbery, and the murders were committed to prevent being identified by the victims.

== Victims ==
All three victims were Jewish according to a number of sources. Other sources have not reported a religion for Mess. Weissman was outspoken about his Jewish faith, and an active member of his synagogue. Teken had majored in history at Brandeis University; he was buried in Israel.

Mess had been described by Tamerlan Tsarnaev as his best friend. Mess, Weissman, and both Tsarnaev brothers had attended Cambridge Rindge and Latin School at various times. Mess received a bachelor's degree in professional writing from Champlain College in 2008.

The three men, who were described as being physically strong, were dragged to or killed in three different rooms. Mess was a well-known mixed martial arts fighter and was listed as a martial arts instructor on his death certificate. Teken was listed as a personal trainer on his death certificate. Weissman was a bodybuilder.

In 2008, police had pulled Weissman over for failing to yield, and smelled marijuana smoke in his vehicle. He was charged with marijuana possession and intent to distribute. Teken lived in Waltham, where certain neighbors said they believed he was a drug dealer, saying he rarely left the house and had a steady stream of visitors. In 2010, Mess and another man were arrested on charges that they assaulted several people at a store.

== 2011 investigation ==
The bodies of the three men—Mess, 25, Weissman, 31, and Teken, 37,—were discovered by Mess's ex-girlfriend on September 12 in Mess's apartment at 12 Harding Avenue in Waltham, Massachusetts. Autopsies revealed that their throats had been slit from ear to ear with such force that they were nearly decapitated. The bodies had been left covered with thousands of dollars' worth of marijuana (six pounds of marijuana; in what investigators described as a symbolic gesture) and thousands of dollars of cash, in three different rooms. Police found $5,000 in cash at the scene, which suggested that robbery was not the motive.

Police said that the murders were not random. Two unidentified men had been seen at the apartment before the murders. Middlesex District Attorney Gerard Leone said that it appeared that two unknown perpetrators and the victims knew each other, based on evidence that the police had obtained. It was believed that multiple people other than the victims were at the scene, and that the victims let the killers into their apartment; there was no evidence of forced entry. Neighbors whose windows were open did not hear anything unusual.

== 2013 investigation developments ==
The Boston Globe first made the connection of the Tsarnaev brothers to the murders on April 22, 2013, after the Boston Marathon bombing. The Middlesex County District Attorney's Office stated that it was investigating the possible connection of bombing suspect Tamerlan Tsarnaev to the murders. ABC reported that authorities believe Tsarnaev may have been responsible for the triple homicide. The Federal Bureau of Investigation (FBI) joined the investigation in April.

Investigators on the Boston Marathon bombing case said Tamerlan Tsarnaev visited Dagestan and neighboring Chechnya for six months following the date of the Waltham murders. They sought to determine whether the killings may have been timed to take place on the tenth anniversary of the September 11 attacks.

After the Marathon bombing, a Planet Aid driver found discarded fireworks in the Planet Aid donation bin in the parking lot of a restaurant, Gerry's Italian Kitchen, that has been connected in other ways to the Waltham murders case and to the Tsarnaev brothers. Police investigators told ABC News that "the gunpowder had been emptied from the fireworks and the shells discarded in a shopping bag inside the bin."

=== Tamerlan Tsarnaev's connection to the victims ===
Authorities believe Tamerlan Tsarnaev may be responsible for the triple homicide

Tamerlan Tsarnaev had formerly described murder victim Brendan Mess, who lived a few blocks from him in Cambridge and was a year younger than Tsarnaev, as his best friend. Tsarnaev had been a regular visitor at Mess's apartment where the murders took place, and authorities believe that they were roommates for a time. Mess also brought Tsarnaev with him to social events and fight events. Investigators believe Tsarnaev was one of the last people to see Mess alive.

Both men were boxers and spent hours training and sparring together, starting in 2009. In 2011, Tsarnaev had introduced Mess to John Allan, owner of Wai Kru Mixed Martial Arts in Allston, describing him as his "best friend". Tsarnaev stopped going to the martial arts center after Mess was murdered, and did not return until March 2013, when he unexpectedly visited and acted rudely.

The website BuzzFeed interviewed a man named Ray, who was a friend of Mess and an acquaintance of Tsarnaev. Ray said: "Tam wasn't there at the memorial service, he wasn't at the funeral, he wasn't around at all ... And he was really close with Brendan. That's why it's so weird when he said, 'I don't have any American friends.'" Ray continued: "He was somebody who was in contact with Brendan on a daily basis. Anybody like that you would think they would have been around." Ray did not have any further contact with Tsarnaev after the murders.

One of Mess's relatives confirmed that Tsarnaev was not at Mess's funeral or memorial service. The relative also noted Tsarnaev and Mess had disagreed over Mess's lifestyle choices. On May 10, 2013, Massachusetts investigators were reported to have forensic evidence placing the Tsarnaev brothers at the crime scene. Further definitive DNA testing had to be completed before an indictment against the surviving brother could be considered, according to the officials. Officials said cell phone records for that date appeared to put the Tsarnaev brothers in the area of the murders.

=== Ibragim Todashev interview and death ===
On May 22, 2013, law enforcement officers, including an FBI special agent from the Boston field office, and two Massachusetts State Police troopers, interviewed a Chechen immigrant named Ibragim Todashev for approximately eight hours at his apartment in Orlando, Florida, regarding the Waltham triple murder and his connections to Tamerlan Tsarnaev and other extremists. They said that he implicated both himself and Tamerlan Tsarnaev in the murders during the questioning and was beginning to write a formal statement when he asked to take a break and then suddenly attacked the FBI agent. Todashev was shot multiple times and killed by the officers.

Todashev was unarmed when he was killed, although initial reports stated that he had a knife. The agent sustained minor injuries requiring stitches. The FBI established a post-shooting incident-review team to investigate the shooting.

=== Time of the murders ===
Based on cell phone usage, police believe the killings took place on the evening of September 11. A call was placed at 8:54 p.m. from Weissman's cell phone to Gerry's Italian Kitchen, a Watertown restaurant, for delivery of three dinner entrees. When a delivery woman arrived at 9:14 p.m., there was no answer at the door, and no one answered when the restaurant called Weissman's cell phone.

== See also ==
- Crime in Massachusetts
- List of homicides in Massachusetts
