= Attorney General's Award for Exceptional Service =

Attorney General’s David Margolis Award for Exceptional Service
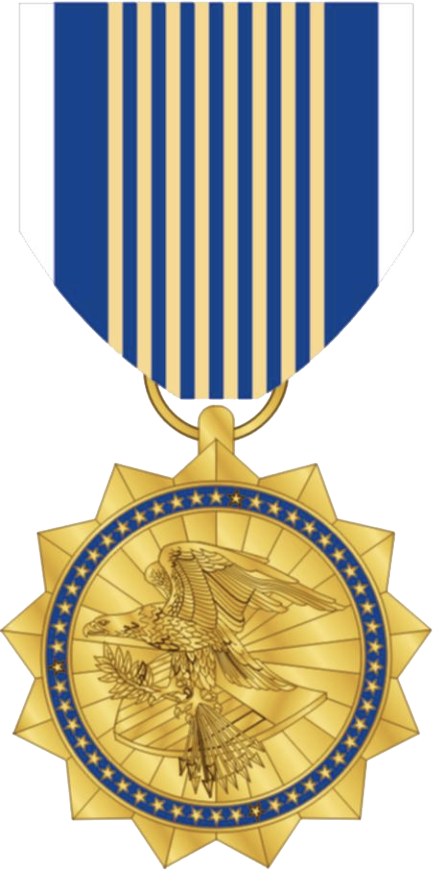
- Awarded for: Justice Department Employee Achievement
- Sponsored by: U.S. Attorney General
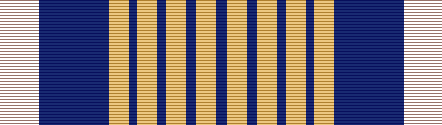
- Ribbon

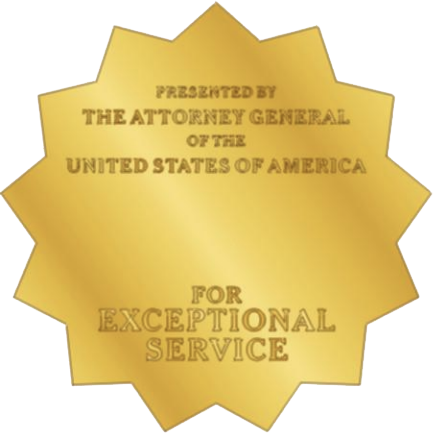
- Reverse

The Attorney General's David Margolis Award for Exceptional Service is the Department of Justice's highest award for employee performance. The award was renamed after Associate Deputy Attorney General David Margolis, who served for 51 years in the Department of Justice, in 2016.

== Criteria ==
The award may be given for achievements or contributions that must demonstrate one of the following:

- The performance service in the public interest above requirements to improve the operation, public understanding of the Department's mission, or accomplishments of one of the goals of the department.
- Outstanding contribution to the Department of Justice and/or exceptionally outstanding leadership in the administration of programs which meet unique or emergency situations.
- Extraordinary courage and risk of life in performing an act resulting in direct benefits to the department or the nation.

== Recipients ==
=== 2024 ===
Investigation and prosecution team of the Tree of Life Synagogue shooting: Barry K. Disney, Troy Rivetti, Aaron J. Stewart, Soo C. Song, Samantha Bell, Nicole Vasquez Schmitt, Brian R. Collins, Christopher M. Hanrahan, Evan P. Browne, Adrienne R. Howe, Bridget M. Simunovic, Mary J. Hahn, Kristin N. Czernewski and Julia K. Gegenheimer.

=== 2023 ===
Hilary Axam, William Nolan, Melinda Williams, Laura Provinzino, Craig Baune, David Genrich, Stefnie Braun, Selina Kolsrud, Daniel Czapko, Mark Zeitz, Tonya Price, John Tschida and Kevin Sullivan

=== 2022 ===
Samantha Trepel, Tara Allison, Allen Slaughter, Evan Gilead, LeeAnn Bell Manda Sertich, Samantha Bates, Blake Hostetter, Henry Fronk, Stefnie Braun, Selina Kolsrud, Christina Busse and Daniel Czapko

=== 2021 ===
Jessica A. Nye, Peter Ahearn Jr, Blair H. Newman, John A. Maser, Lindsey Chiesa, Naomi R. Patrick, Thomas S. Breeden, Carrie A. Crot, Sean A. McDermott, Eric L. Iverson, Anand P. Ramaswamy and Ryan Kao Jeung Dickey

=== 2020 ===
Assistant Attorney General for Administration Lee J. Lofthus

=== 2017 ===
Prosecution team in the case of the Trinitarios gang members: Nola B. Heller, Sarah R. Krissoff, Matthew J. Laroche, Michael D. Maimin, Rachel Maimin, Micah WJ Smith, Darci Brady, Andrew J. Daher, Kenneth G. Crotty, William D. Melodick, Moises Walters, Paul H. Pasuco, Paul Jeselson, Pedro Alfonso, John Urena

=== 2016 ===
Team responsible for the investigation and prosecution of Dzhokhar Tsarnaev, the Boston Marathon bomber: Aloke S. Chakravarty, James B. Farmer, William D. Weinreb, Cara M. Henderson, Christina DiIorio-Sterling, Kathleen M. Griffin, Jessica M. Pooler, Steven D. Mellin, Jeffrey B. Kahan, Courtland D. Rae, David S. Bell, Timothy D. Brown, Michelle M. Gamble, David P. Cora, Gregory R. Gonzalez, Joseph N. Kaster, Pamela J. Hall, Laura P. Galban, Jamie M. Haydel, Kevin W. Neal, Jeffrey L. Bohn, Jesse Donaruma, Matthew Lawlor, Robert M. Lima, Jonathan A. Lemay, Gregory C. Petchel, Charles Hardison, Harry W. Little, Mark S. Walker, Richard “Todd” Jordan,Leigh N. Marchegiani, Christopher J. Bould
