= Miles in Transit =

American YouTuber and transit planner (born 2000)

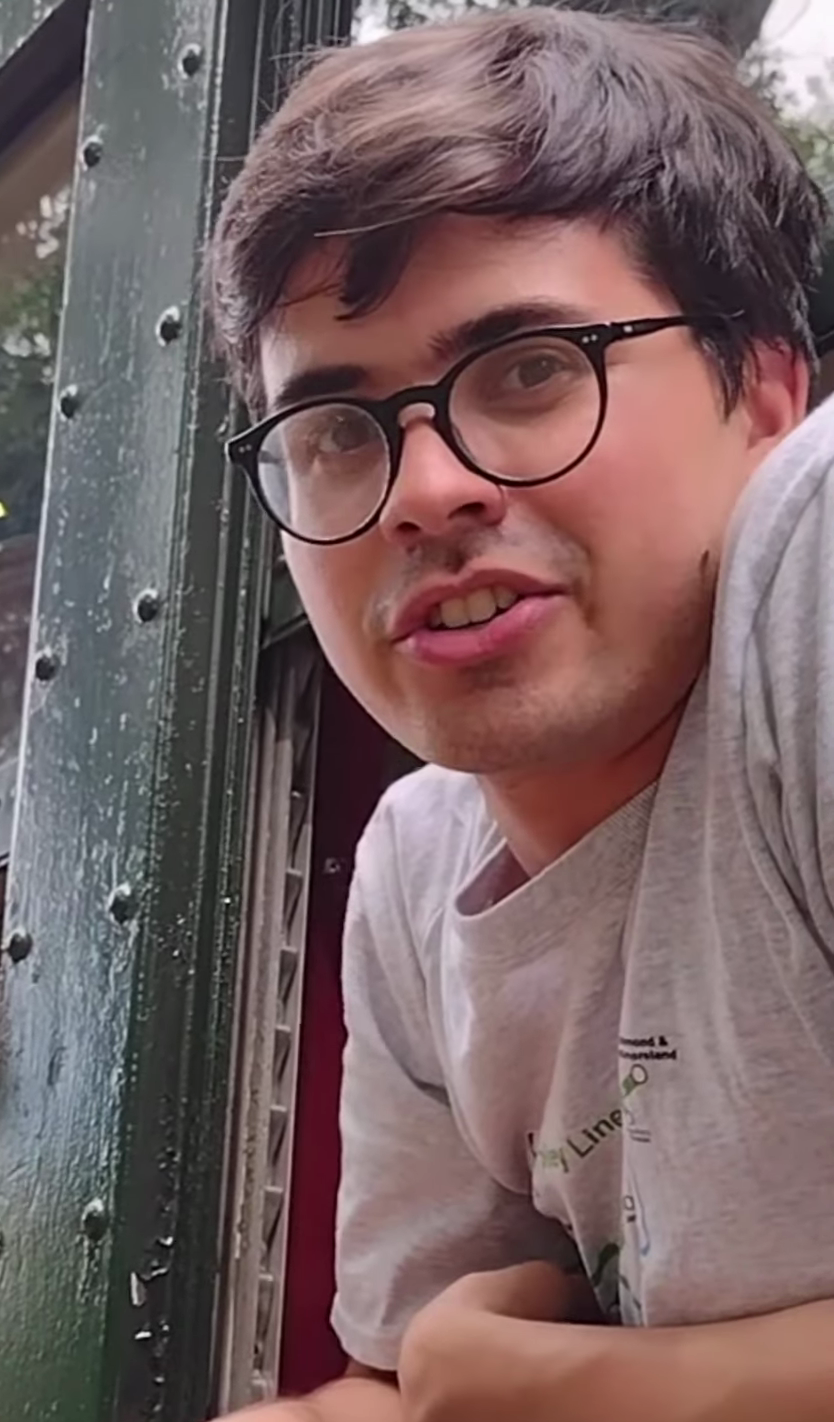
- Taylor at Glen Mills station, Glen Mills, Pennsylvania, 2022
- Born: Miles Taylor; January 17, 2000 (age 26)
- Education: University of Pennsylvania
- Occupations: Transit planner; YouTuber

YouTube information
- Channel: Miles in Transit
- Years active: 2013–present
- Genres: Transit; Vlog
- Subscribers: 99.3 thousand
- Views: 18.9 million
- Last updated: April 16, 2026

Miles Taylor (born January 17, 2000) is an American YouTuber and transit planner. He is the main presenter of the YouTube channel Miles in Transit, which offers comedic coverage of public transit, often featuring obscure, infrequent, or especially underutilized services.

Taylor grew up in Cambridge, Massachusetts, in Greater Boston, and began writing a blog at the age of 13, detailing his experiences on buses and trains of the Massachusetts Bay Transportation Authority (MBTA). He studied urban planning at the University of Pennsylvania in Philadelphia, and expanded his blog's content into long-form videos during the COVID-19 pandemic.

== Biography ==
Miles Taylor was born on January 17, 2000, and grew up in Cambridge, Massachusetts, a suburb of Boston. At the age of 13, he started a blog, titled "Miles on the MBTA," detailing his trips around the Massachusetts Bay Transportation Authority system. In November 2013, Taylor accompanied British transit enthusiast Adham Fisher on a record-breaking trip to visit every station on the MBTA subway and light rail network, in a Boston version of the Subway Challenge. Fisher and Taylor completed the trip in 8 hours and 5 minutes, despite multiple delays.

While attending high school at Cambridge Rindge and Latin School, Taylor participated in a summer program at Cambridge Community Television, the public-access television provider in the city of Cambridge. By the time he graduated from high school, Taylor had reviewed every MBTA rail station and bus route currently in operation.

Taylor enrolled at the University of Pennsylvania in Philadelphia in 2018, and shifted his blog's focus to SEPTA services with a new "Miles on SEPTA" section. He studied urban planning at Penn, and returned to Boston during summers to intern at the MBTA. As of 2025, Taylor works for the MBTA as a transit service planner.

== YouTube channel ==
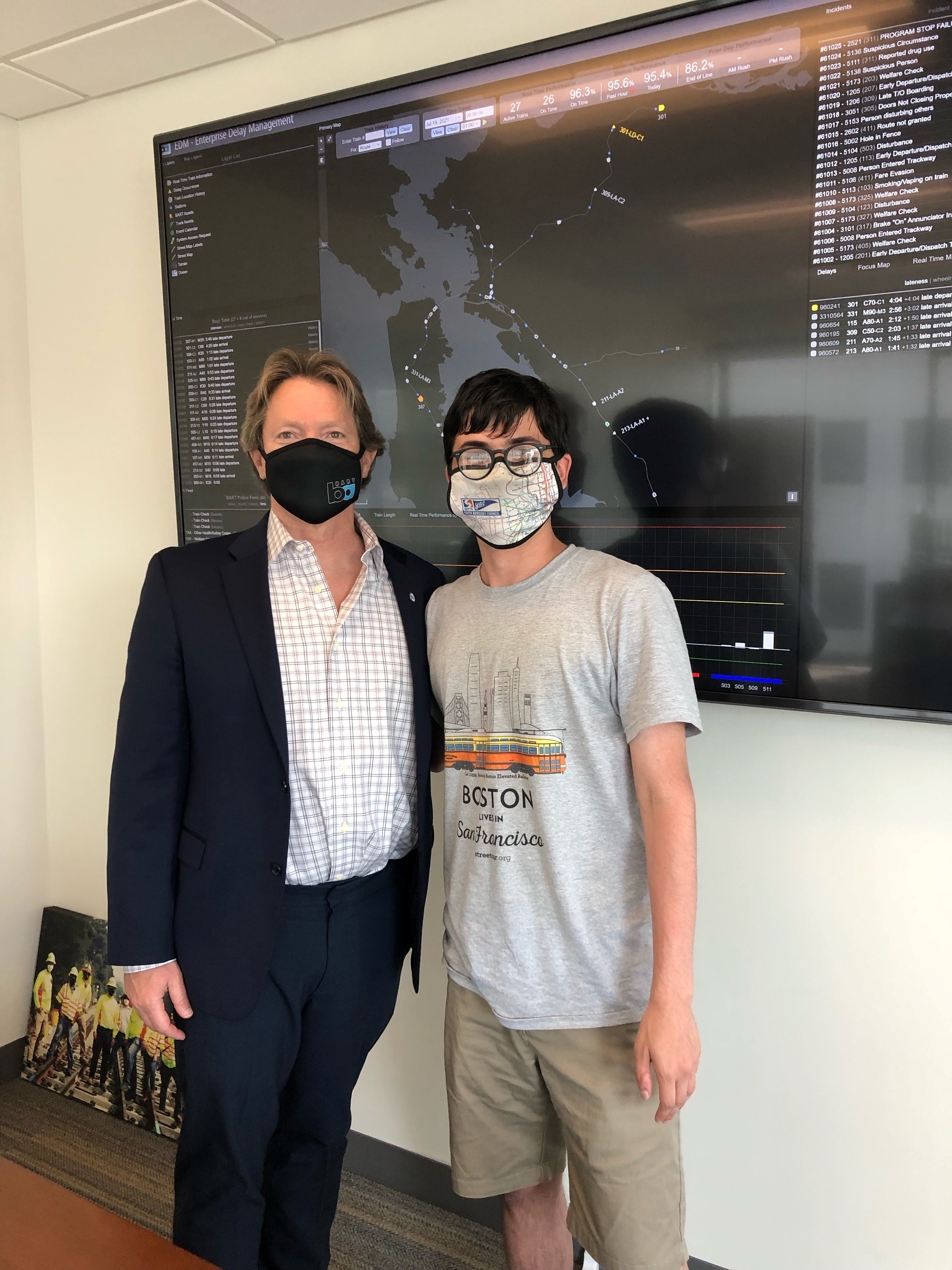
Taylor (right) with BART general manager Bob Powers in July 2021

Taylor runs the Miles in Transit YouTube channel, which documents his experience with public transit services in the United States and beyond. His videos in the United States often feature obscure, infrequent, and underutilized services and stations. Taylor began posting to the YouTube channel in 2013, and expanded into long-form content during the COVID-19 pandemic.

=== Content ===
Miles in Transit videos often approach public transit from a comedic perspective, featuring analysis of underutilized services and absurd journeys interspersed with running gags and original music. Some of Taylor's videos cover intercity transit, including Amtrak, Greyhound, and other intercity bus services. Other videos cover local transit, including buses, trolleybuses, ferries, rapid transit, and commuter rail. Most videos cover American and Canadian transit, with occasional trips outside North America.

The Miles In Transit channel features a number of frequent collaborators, including fellow University of Pennsylvania students Jackson Betz and Aleena Parenti, and Rutgers urban planning student Jeremy Zorek. Taylor and Betz compose and perform original music for the channel (which includes a 2025 compilation album consisting of the channel's music Miles in Music), and Parenti accompanies Taylor on many long-distance trips. Zorek features in many videos that depict NJ Transit services.

=== Advocacy ===
Many of Taylor's videos depict his experience on intercity bus services, including Greyhound and Megabus. In a 2022 interview, Taylor argued that nationalized intercity bus service would improve the passenger experience: "You have to remember that Greyhound is a private company that just happens to have a monopoly over bus travel in the U.S., and because of that, they can treat people however they want. Nationalizing Greyhound will allow more money to be put into it to improve the service quality a little bit, like invest in new stations."

Taylor also advocates for simpler and easier-to-use transit fare systems. In a 2021 visit to the San Francisco Bay Area, Taylor rode the entire BART system and met with BART general manager Bob Powers to argue for more integrated fares between BART and other Bay Area transit services. Taylor's advocacy for simplification of public transit fares also takes a more comedic tone. In a 2022 video documenting Taylor and Zorek's journey from Cape May, New Jersey to Warwick, New York on NJ Transit local buses, the pair kept a running tally of their fares on a large whiteboard. The whiteboard highlighted the difficulty of understanding NJ Transit bus fares, which Zorek argued were "infamous for being kind of hard to understand."
