= Gina Grant college admissions controversy =

1995 Harvard admissions incident

The Gina Grant college admissions controversy was a public debate in the United States about the decision by Harvard University and other universities in 1995 to rescind admission offers to Gina Grant, a high school student, after the universities learned that she had killed her mother at age 14 in 1990. Controversy ensued over questions including whether she was obligated to disclose a crime committed as a juvenile; whether her original sentence was appropriate; and whether the decisions by Harvard and several other universities to withdraw their offers were justified.

== Background ==
Gina Grant was born in 1976 to Charles Grant and Dorothy Mayfield, both of whom lived in Lexington, South Carolina. She had one sister, her elder by nine years. Gina's father died of lung cancer when Gina was 11 years old.

== Voluntary manslaughter ==
At the time of her crime in 1990, Grant was a juvenile, so according to the law pertaining to minors, the criminal records are sealed. However, the Lexington County sheriff, James Metts, who handled the original case, released Grant's name immediately after her arrest.

On September 13, 1990, in Lexington, South Carolina, the 14-year-old Grant bludgeoned her mother with a crystal candlestick, crushing her skull. She mopped up pools of blood from the kitchen floor and hid the candlestick and bloody rags in a closet. She then tried to make the death look like suicide by sticking a carving knife into the side of her mother's neck, and wrapping her mother's fingers around the handle.

Grant initially told police that her mother attacked her while holding a knife and then stabbed herself in the throat. When the candlestick was discovered, Grant changed her story, eventually telling the police that she had committed the killing in self-defense. She was charged with murder.

In mitigation, evidence suggested that Grant's mother was an alcoholic. Gina claimed that her mother had been physically abusive, to which Gina's sister attested. Grant pleaded no contest to voluntary manslaughter and was sentenced to a year in juvenile detention, with probation until age 18. Her boyfriend pleaded no contest to being an accessory to voluntary manslaughter after the fact and served nearly a year in juvenile detention.

Grant was given permission by the juvenile court to relocate to Cambridge, Massachusetts, to live with a paternal aunt and uncle. She began attending Cambridge Rindge and Latin High School in 1992, where she performed well academically, tutored children, and was co-captain of the tennis team.

== Admissions revocations ==
In January 1995 Grant was admitted to Harvard University, having told her Harvard interviewer that her mother had died in an accident. After she was featured in an April 2 Boston Globe article about students who had overcome difficult circumstances, Harvard and The Globe received anonymous communications containing old news articles about Grant's mother's death. Harvard rescinded Grant's admission the next day, referring only to a list of general reasons that admissions are sometimes rescinded. Harvard refused Grant's request to meet with the admissions committee.

Grant, through a lawyer, argued that educational institutions are forbidden by Massachusetts law to ask about criminal matters not resulting in "convictions"‍—‌juveniles are "adjudicated delinquent" rather than "convicted"‍—‌and that she was not obliged to disclose an event that occurred when she was a juvenile and was reflected only in her sealed juvenile record.

Some campus publications sided with Grant, citing her mother's alcoholism and Grant's allegations of physical abuse. An editorial in The New York Times, an article in the Chicago Tribune, and Harvard Law professors Charles Ogletree and Alan Dershowitz also criticized Harvard's action.

Columbia University and Barnard College also rescinded acceptances they had extended to Grant, but Tufts University allowed their acceptance of her to stand, and Grant entered Tufts as part of its class of 1999.
