= Helen Lee Franklin =

American women's rights activist (1895-1949)

Helen Beatrice Lee Franklin (October 1895 - January 19, 1949) was an American teacher and social justice advocate who moved to Boston during the Great Migration of African Americans.

== Life ==
Franklin was born in Aiken, South Carolina to Henrietta and Sherman Lee who had five other children. Her father worked as printer, while her mother stayed at home and cared for Helen and her siblings. Her father was often "harassed for printing and distributing literature condemning segregation and discrimination", likely contributing to the family's move North. Franklin's family moved to Massachusetts in the early 20th century, initially moving to Somerville, where her father found work as a real estate agent and her mother as a dressmaker. Helen attended the Charles G. Pope School until her family moved to Cambridge, where she attended the Cambridge High and Latin School (now the Cambridge Rindge and Latin School). She graduated in 1914.

A few years after her graduation, Franklin returned to the South to work at the Palmer Memorial Institute in Sedalia, North Carolina, a school for African American children. She continued to work at schools intended to teach African Americans throughout the 1920s, such as the Utica Normal and Industrial School in Mississippi. In March 1924, Franklin traveled back to Cambridge with a group called the "Sedalia Quartette," a singing group that had helped to raise funds for the Palmer Memorial Institute in the North. Five years later, on August 10, 1929, the Cambridge Community Center opened with Helen as the first secretary. She continued to help there until 1936.

In 1931, however, she had focused her attention away from the Community Center, and to the Boston Urban League, a group dedicated to helping African Americans having trouble with economic, social, and health issues; she attended health fairs to raise awareness about the League. From 1931 to about 1936, she served as the assistant secretary under George Goodwin. Circa 1935, Helen moved to Roxbury following the deaths of her mother and father in December 1930 and January 1931 respectively. Despite her efforts to save her family home by paying off their debts, she was likely led to the move because it had another strong Black community. During the 1930s, she also devoted herself to several clubs including the ladies auxiliary of the Veterans of Foreign Wars. She served as her post's musician and helped organize events with her sister, Blanche.

In November 1941, Helen began working at the Charlestown Navy Yard as a typist, where she experienced discrimination; she and 11 other women sent a letter to the Fair Employment Practices Committee, stating that they believed their employers were creating a specific section for them and giving white women more promotion opportunities than them. However, this case was later dismissed by the Committee. After hearing of this outcome, Helen reached out to the War Manpower Commission requesting a transfer to the veteran's bureau.

Helen died on January 19, 1949, at the age of 53. During the last years of her life, she remained active at the Veterans Rehabilitation Center of Boston, as well as serving on the Executive Board of the Boston Branch of the NAACP. At her funeral, the eulogy was delivered by Dr. Charlotte Hawkins Brown a lifelong friend and president of the Palmer Memorial Institute.
