= Community Charter School of Cambridge =

Coordinates: 42°22′02.73″N 71°05′04.26″W

Location
- 245 Bent Street; Cambridge, Massachusetts 02141; United States

Information
- Type: Public charter
- Opened: August 2005
- Middle School Principal: Jake Friedman
- High School Principal: Naatuere Ajanaku
- Head of school: Becki Norris
- Grades: 6-12
- Hours in school day: 7 hours 10 minutes (Mon., Tue., Thu., Fri.), 5 hours (Wed.)
- Area: Kendall Square
- Colors: Red and black
- Sports: Soccer, basketball, baseball, softball, cross country, track and field, volleyball
- Mascot: Cougar
- Nickname: CCSC
- Team name: CCSC Cougars
- Rival: PHA

Community Charter School of Cambridge is a charter school located in Cambridge, Massachusetts, United States. Located in the Kendall Square area near MIT, the school serves 360 students in grades 6-12. CCSC opened in September 2005.

== History ==
The school was initially scheduled to open in the fall of 2005 with grades 7 and 8. It was to receive 180 students, with 150 being from Cambridge. Paula Evans, a former headmaster of the Cambridge Rindge & Latin School, co-founded the school with Emma Stellman, formerly a physics teacher from Cambridge Rindge & Latin, and Rob Riordan, a co-founder of High Tech High and former faculty member at Cambridge Rindge & Latin.

The school had a controversial start. Before it was granted a charter from the Massachusetts Department of Elementary and Secondary Education, the Cambridge Public Schools superintendent and members of the school committee of the Cambridge Public Schools (CPS) asked Evans to halt her project. Nancy Walser, a board member of CPS at the time, said that some members of the charter school board had resigned by February 2004 and that opponents to the charter school passed the information along but never pressured people.

== Notable alumni ==
- Dzhokhar Tsarnaev – Boston Marathon bomber and terrorist; attended the middle school program, withdrew in grade 9.
