= Cambridge Rindge and Latin School =

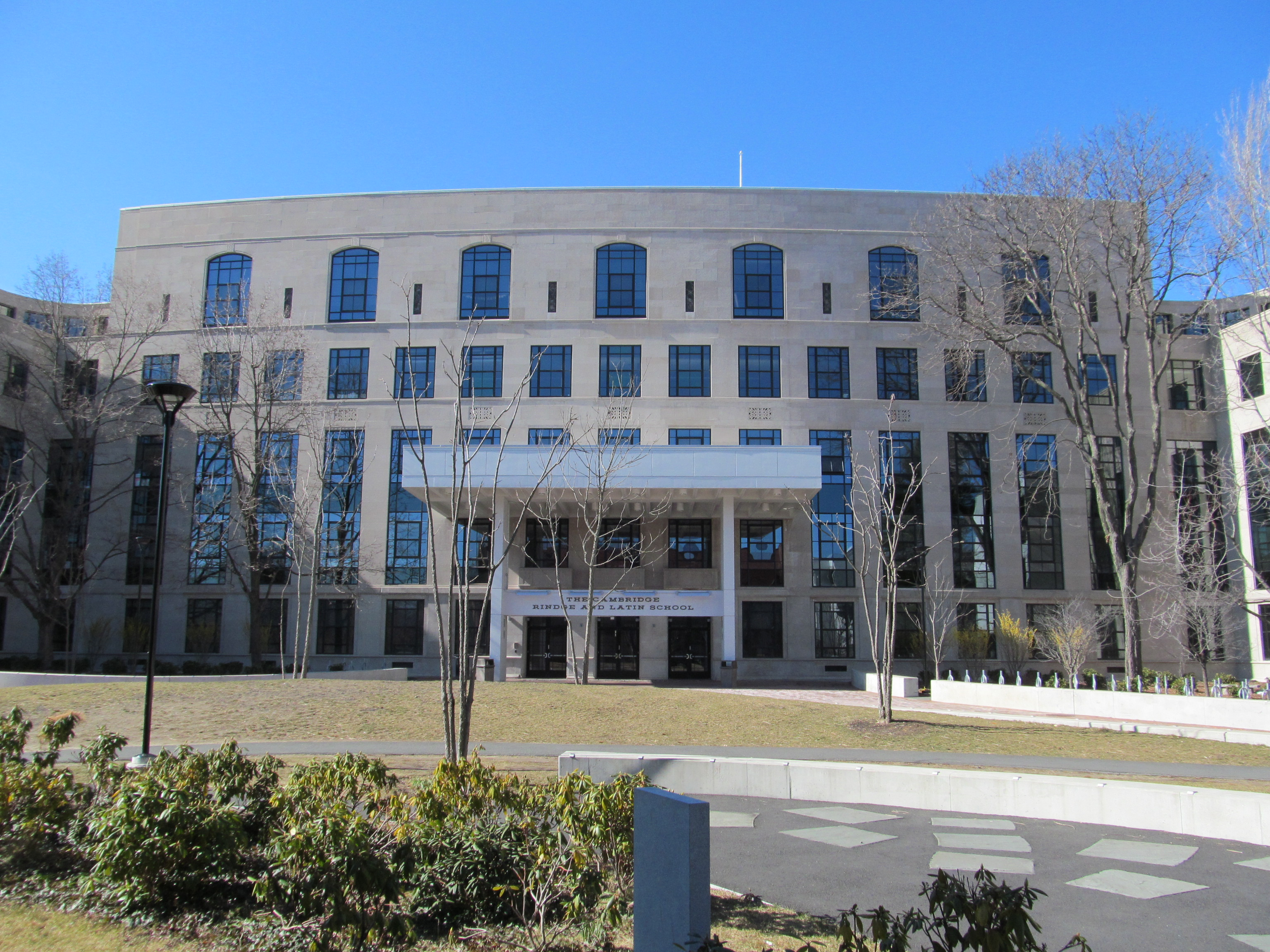

Location
- 459 Broadway; Cambridge, Massachusetts 02138; United States; 42°22′27″N 71°06′43″W

Information
- Type: Public
- Motto: Opportunity, Diversity, and Respect
- Established: 1648; 378 years ago
- School district: Cambridge Public School District
- Principal: Alan Gately-Gehant (interim) (preceded by Damon Smith)
- Teaching staff: 217 (2021–2022)
- Grades: 9–12
- Age range: 14–20
- Enrollment: 1,979 (2023–2024)
- Colors: Black, silver, and white
- Athletics conference: MIAA District A – Dual County League
- Mascot: Falcons
- Accreditation: NEASC
- Newspaper: The Register Forum
- Nobel laureates: Eric Allin Cornell
- Website: crls.cpsd.us

The Cambridge Rindge and Latin School (also known as "CRLS" or "Rindge") is a public high school in Cambridge, Massachusetts, United States. It is a part of the Cambridge Public School District. In 1977, Cambridge Rindge and Latin was established as a merger of Rindge Technical, Cambridge High and Latin, and two alternative programs (called the Pilot and Fundamental). The Pilot, Fundamental, and Rindge Technical and Vocational retained a small core of students, while the rest of school was randomly split into four houses: A, B, C, and D. The newly built high school at the time increased its capacity to more than 2,000 students in all four grades.

== History ==
=== Precursors ===
In 1642, the year Harvard College's first class of nine young men was graduated, the General Court made it the duty of Cambridge to require that parents and masters properly educate their children or be fined if they neglected to do so. In 1648, Cambridge set up a public grammar school, Master Elijah Corlett's "lattin schoole," making Cambridge the fifth town (after Boston, Charlestown, Dorchester, and Salem) in the Massachusetts Bay Colony to do so. Corlett's schoolhouse came into the possession of Old Cambridge in 1660, and over the next century was succeeded by several new buildings. The public school that evolved from Cortlett's original was a "grammar school" in a double sense: an English grammar school for Old Cambridge and a Latin grammar school (teaching the rudiments of Latin and Greek) for all Cambridge. The school generally aimed to prepare students for admission to college:

"And by the side of the colledge a faire GRAMMAR Schoole, for the training up of young Schollars, and fitting of them for ACADEMICALL LEARNING, that still as they are judged ripe, they may be received into the colledge of this Schoole. Master CORLETT is the Mr., who hath very well approved himselfe for his abilities, dexterity and painfulness in teaching and education of the youth under him."

Education during this period was open only to boys, though by 1832, public schools in Cambridge were open to girls as well. In 1838, Cambridgeport organized a public high school to serve all of Cambridge at the corner of Broadway and Windsor Streets. However, since the location was not easily accessible to either Old Cambridge or East Cambridge, most of the new high schools' students were drawn from Cambridgeport. In 1843, Old Cambridge set up the Female High School, and East Cambridge completed its Otis schoolhouse.

=== Current institution ===
Not until 1848 did plans to merge the high schools of the three competitive wards overcome sectional differences. This marked the origin of the Cambridge High School, which began in a new building erected at the corner of Amory and Summer streets and was immediately flooded with over 135 applicants.

The Cambridge High School was divided in 1886: its classical department became the Cambridge Latin School and its remaining departments the Cambridge English High School. The English High School was located at the corner of Broadway and Fayette Streets, while the Latin School was transferred to the Lee Street church, which had been renovated to receive it. At the time of the separation, the high school contained 515 pupils, and 16 teachers. Six teachers and 165 pupils went to the Latin school.

In 1979, Cambridge was one of the first cities to remedy de facto segregation in public schools using a system called "controlled choice": parents could choose their preference for schools, and the district will select a school for them while taking both that selection and the need for a diverse student population into account. In the 1980s, there began to be rumors that the different houses were separated by social and ethnic groups: a "preppy" group (with mostly white students), a group with mostly black "jocks", and a group focusing on bilingual education for mostly Haitian immigrant students. Soon, many white middle-class families began to request that their children would be assigned to the "preppy" group. There were also parental concerns about not being able to get into the smaller programs.

Robert Peterkin, the then-superintendent decided to answer to these concerns by creating two separate programs within the school: a STEM-focused "exam school" and school focused on arts. This caused protest from the school's staff. A group called Concerned Black Staff was worried that the "exam school" would mostly serve white middle-class students.

In 1987, in response to this concern, the school formed the Key Results Committee: a formal committee that set to research "exemplary schools" across the United States, decided against setting up the two schools. They instead (in their words) "proposed concrete measures to boost house identity." They also decided to rewrite the mission statement of the school, saying that:

The primary commitment of the Cambridge Rindge and Latin School is the preparation of students to be literate, competent, educated, skilled, informed citizens—appreciative of the arts, capable of critical thinking and problem solving, and able to function effectively within a complex, interdependent and pluralistic world.

From 1969 to 2000 the school hosted an experimental program known as The Pilot School, founded as a joint venture of the Cambridge public schools and the Harvard Graduate School of Education. The Pilot School was established to offer a small classroom experience including outside-of-school experiences. The program closed in June 2000 as part of an overall restructuring of the school.

In 2001 there was an attempt to restructure the Cambridge Rindge & Latin school under headmaster Paula Evans, which had found controversy. She resigned shortly afterwards. After her resignation she began efforts to create a charter school, which became the Community Charter School of Cambridge (CCSC). Colleen Walsh of the Boston Globe said that Evans's charter school efforts "touched off a firestorm" and that "many people" were upset at her because they perceived that she had abandoned Cambridge Rindge & Latin.

Beginning in 2003, the City of Cambridge set in motion an plan for CRLS: "the first major renovation and refurbishing of the 35-year-old [sic] high school building." The project continued to be pushed back, due to state funding issues and other obstructions along the way. In 2006, the state announced a return in funding, and by the Spring 2007 the School Committee started looking at wider-ranging renovations for the building. The renovations were at last undertaken in 2009-2011.

=== Athletics ===
Athletics have always played a major part in the school's extracurricular activity structure. The 11 fall sports take place between September and Thanksgiving (the day of the football team's final game), Winter sports are played between the first Monday following Thanksgiving and February/March depending on the circumstances of the year. The ten spring sports start on the third Monday in March, and finish in the latter days of May.

=== The Register Forum ===
The school's newspaper is Register Forum. It was first founded in 1891 as the C.M.T.S Register, the name was further changed to the Rindge Register, and in 1977, when the two public high schools in the city merged, their papers merged as well. The Cambridge Latin Forum merged with the Rindge Register to become The Register Forum. The Register Forum now publishes 10 editions per year at the end of each month, September to June. Those editions range from 8 to 24 pages, and focus on events around the city and school. The paper was formerly printed at The Harvard Crimson press, but has since moved production to out of state facilities due to cost restraints.

=== Media Arts Program ===
During the early 21st century the Media Arts Studio was founded at 454 Broadway Ct in Cambridge MA. Throughout the years of the Media Arts Program, a large archive of film was broadcast on local channels 6 and 26, some of the students who have participated in the Media Arts Studio Program have gone on to pursue careers in sports broadcasting from prestigious universities such as Syracuse.

=== Controversies ===
During the late 1980s and early 1990s, the school was subject to multiple accusations of inherent racism in its infrastructure, which led to the disbanding of the original houses, as well as the changing of the original school mascot from a bust of a Native American to a falcon and their name from Warriors to Falcons after concerns about the racist history of the mascot. Students entered their ideas and then voted for the new mascot in a school wide contest. The graduating class of 1990 was the last class to wear brown and gold, being the last of the Warriors.

In 2000 the Commonwealth of Massachusetts uncovered a number of issues with the school's electrical and graphic arts vocational programs, citing below-standard safety equipment, staffing, and classroom space, and placed them on probation.

CRLS has had student walkouts in protest of sexual assault and harassment at the school in 2016, 2019, and 2021. The 2021 walkout led to the creation of a feminist student advocacy group called Title IX Aurelia Advocates.

== Notable alumni ==
- Ben Affleck (1990), actor, director, and screenwriter
- Casey Affleck (1993), actor
- Emily Banks, actress "Shore Leave", model Miss Rheingold
- Matt Damon (1988), actor and screenwriter
- Nate Albert, musician Mighty Mighty Bosstones, record executive
- Leroy Anderson, composer
- Orson Bean, actor
- Lukas Biewald, entrepreneur
- Traci Bingham, actress and model
- Walter Brennan, actor and three-time Academy Award-winner
- Max Casella, (1985) actor, The Sopranos and Doogie Howser, M.D.
- Peggy Cass, actress and comedian
- Del Castillo, (1893 – 1992), organist, composer
- David Chu, Hong Kong politician
- Jeremy Collins, Winner, Sole Survivor of Survivor: Cambodia
- Eric Cornell, 2001 Nobel Prize in Physics
- Bronson Crothers, pediatric neurologist
- E. E. Cummings, poet
- Bill de Blasio, the former Mayor of New York City
- Patrick Ewing (1981), NCAA Basketball champion and head coach of the Georgetown Hoyas, legendary center for the New York Knicks, and member of the Basketball Hall of Fame
- Wilma Cannon Fairbank (1928) Scholar of Chinese art, diplomat.
- Jessica Garretson Finch (1893), author, suffragette, founding president of Finch College.
- Helen Lee Franklin (1895 – 1949), teacher and social justice advocate
- Gina Grant, known for gaining early admission to Harvard University, only to have it revoked when it was revealed that she had killed her mother
- Vernon Grant, cartoonist
- Sian Heder, writer/director of CODA and other films
- Emanuel D. Molyneaux Hewlett, one of the first African American attorneys to argue before the United States Supreme Court
- Karl Hobbs, head coach of the George Washington University Colonials basketball team
- Charles "Charlie" Jenkins, winner of two gold medals at the 1956 Summer Olympics in Melbourne, Australia
- D. D. Kosambi (1907 – 1966), mathematician, statistician, Marxist historian of India, and polymath
- Tom and Ray Magliozzi, aka Click and Clack, the Tappet Brothers, hosts of NPR's Car Talk
- Walter Pierce, director of Celebrity Series of Boston
- Rumeal Robinson, NCAA Basketball champion at University of Michigan and NBA player
- Harold Russell, Canadian-born World War II veteran and Academy Award winner
- Walter J. Sullivan, Massachusetts politician
- John Thomas, set several world records in the high jump. Winner of Bronze medal at 1960 Summer Olympics in Rome & Silver medal at 1964 Summer Olympics in Tokyo.
- Jean Tatlock, psychiatrist, communist, and writer who was romantically involved with J. Robert Oppenheimer
- Dzhokhar Tsarnaev, and Tamerlan Tsarnaev, Boston Marathon bombers – Philip Martin of WGBH described them as the school's "most infamous graduates".
- Korczak Ziółkowski, sculptor of the Crazy Horse Memorial
- Eddie Waitkus, Major League Baseball player
- Miles Taylor, public transport advocate and YouTuber for channel Miles in Transit
- Sam Wachman, Dayton Literary Peace Prize-winning author
- Cameron Moody, Emmy nominated film and tv composer
