= Tamerlan Tsarnaev =

Chechen perpetrator of the 2013 Boston Marathon bombing (1986–2013)

- Тамерлан Царнаев
- Tsarnaev in 2009
- Born: Tamerlan Anzorovich Tsarnaev (Note: Russian: Тамерла́н Анзо́рович Царна́ев [təmʲɪrˈɫan ɐnˈzorəvʲɪtɕ tsɐrˈnajɪf]; Chechen: Царнаев Анзор-кIант Тамерлан Carnayev Anzor-khant Tamerlan; Kyrgyz: Тамерлан Анзор уулу Царнаев, romanized: Tamerlan Anzor uulu Tsarnaev; Avar: Тамерлан Анзоразул вас Царнаев); October 21, 1986; Kyrgyzstan / Kalmyk ASSR, Russian SFSR, Soviet Union
- Died: April 19, 2013 (aged 26); Boston, Massachusetts, U.S.
- Cause of death: Blunt trauma after being accidentally struck by an SUV driven by Dzhokhar Tsarnaev
- Resting place: Al-Barzakh Cemetery; Doswell, Virginia, U.S.
- Citizenship: Kyrgyzstan; Russia
- Known for: Boston Marathon bombing
- Spouse: Katherine Russell (a.k.a. Karima Tsarnaeva) (m. 2010)
- Children: 1 (daughter)
- Relatives: Dzhokhar Tsarnaev (brother) (incarcerated)

Details
- Killed: 5 (2013 Boston Marathon bombing) 3 (2011 Waltham triple murder)
- Injured: 500+

Tamerlan Anzorovich Tsarnaev (/ˌtæmərˈlɑːn ˌ(t)sɑːrˈnaɪɛf/ TAM-ər-LAHN (T)SAR-NY-ef; October 21, 1986 – April 19, 2013) was a terrorist of Chechen and Avar descent. He and his younger brother, Dzhokhar Tsarnaev, committed the Boston Marathon bombing on April 15, 2013.

Tamerlan Tsarnaev entered the United States in the early 2000s and later became a lawful permanent resident. He attended Bunker Hill Community College and pursued a boxing career. At some point in time, he became an adherent of Islamic extremism. In 2011, Russia's Federal Security Service (FSB) warned the Federal Bureau of Investigation (FBI) about Tsarnaev's extremism and his alleged connection to underground groups in the Russian region. Later in 2011, the Central Intelligence Agency (CIA) added Tsarnaev to its Terrorist Identities Datamart Environment database.

According to Dzhokhar Tsarnaev, he and Tamerlan Tsarnaev used pressure cooker bombs to commit the Boston Marathon bombing. One bomb was placed at the Boston Marathon finish line, while the other was placed outside the Forum restaurant. The bombs were detonated at 2:49 pm on April 15, 2013. The bombing killed three people and injured hundreds of others.

On April 18, 2013, the Federal Bureau of Investigation (FBI) released images of Tamerlan and Dzhokhar Tsarnaev in connection with its investigation of the Boston Marathon bombing. Shortly thereafter, the Tsarnaev brothers killed an MIT policeman, carjacked an SUV, and engaged in a shootout with police in the Boston suburb of Watertown. After being shot and tackled by police, Tamerlan Tsarnaev was struck and dragged beneath the stolen SUV driven by his brother, Dzhokhar Tsarnaev. Dzhokhar, later admitted as a co-conspirator in the Boston Marathon bombing, was incarcerated and sentenced to death.

== Childhood and family background ==
The Tsarnaev family was forcibly moved from Chechnya to the Soviet republic of Kyrgyzstan in the years following World War II. Husband Anzor Tsarnaev is Chechen, and wife Zubeidat Tsarnaeva is an Avar. The Tsarnaevs had two daughters and two sons. Tamerlan Tsarnaev was born in the Kalmyk Autonomous Soviet Socialist Republic on October 21, 1986, and Dzhokhar Tsarnaev was born on July 22, 1993. The Tsarnaev family raised their children as Muslims.

As children, Tamerlan and Dzhokhar Tsarnaev lived in Tokmok, Kyrgyzstan. In 2001, the Tsarnaev family moved to Makhachkala, Dagestan, in the Russian Federation. In April 2002, the Tsarnaev parents and Dzhokhar visited the United States on a 90-day tourist visa. Anzor Tsarnaev applied for asylum, citing fears of deadly persecution due to his ties to Chechnya. Tamerlan Tsarnaev was left in the care of his uncle Ruslan in Kyrgyzstan, and arrived in the U.S. approximately two years later. The United States granted asylum to the Tsarnaev parents, and their four children later received "derivative asylum status". The family settled on Norfolk Street in Cambridge, Massachusetts. In March 2007, the Tsarnaevs were granted legal permanent residence. Tamerlan Tsarnaev was a permanent resident of the U.S. and a citizen of both Russia and Kyrgyzstan.

== Activities prior to Boston Marathon bombing ==
=== 2003–2007 ===
According to Tsarnaev's immigration file, he received his visa at the U.S. consulate in Ankara, Turkey and was admitted to the United States in 2003. After arriving in the U.S., he attended Cambridge Rindge and Latin School, a public high school. He applied for admission at the University of Massachusetts Boston for the fall of 2006, but was rejected. He attended Bunker Hill Community College part-time for three terms between 2006 and 2008, studying accounting with hopes of becoming an engineer. He dropped out of school to concentrate on boxing.

=== 2008 ===
In 2008, Tsarnaev's mother urged him to embrace Islam because she was concerned about his drinking, smoking, and pursuit of women. She said he began to read more about it on the Internet. Tsarnaev sometimes attended the Islamic Society of Boston mosque near his home in Cambridge. Although the Americans for Peace and Tolerance, a longtime critic of the mosque, alleges that the mosque supports "a brand of Islamic thought that encourages grievances against the West, distrust of law enforcement and opposition to Western forms of government, dress and social values", the mosque has condemned terrorism and would later ask Tsarnaev to stop attending because he interrupted the Friday sermon.

=== 2009 ===
Tsarnaev was arrested at his home at 410 Norfolk Street in Cambridge, on July 28, 2009, for aggravated domestic assault and battery upon his then-girlfriend. The case was dismissed for lack of prosecution.

Tsarnaev dated Katherine Russell of North Kingstown, Rhode Island on and off while she attended Suffolk University from 2007 to 2010.

The Tsarnaev brothers' uncle, Ruslan Tsarni, said he "had been concerned about his nephew being an extremist since 2009". Tsarni said that Tsarnaev's radicalization started not during his visit to Russia in January 2012, but much earlier in Boston after he was influenced by a Muslim convert known as "Misha". "Misha" was later identified as Mikhail Allakhverdov, a 39-year-old from Rhode Island (of Armenian-Ukrainian origin, born in Azerbaijan). Allakhverdov told The New York Review of Books that he rejected violence, was not Tsarnaev's teacher, had not spoken to Tamerlan in three years and had never met his family members. Furthermore, he said that he had cooperated with a brief FBI investigation that the NYRB reported had found no ties between Allakhverdov and the attacks.

=== 2010 ===
According to a 2010 photo essay in The Comment, the student magazine of Boston University College of Communication, Tsarnaev said that he was working to become a naturalized citizen in time to be selected for the U.S. Olympic boxing team. He added that he would "rather compete for the United States than for Russia", while remarking that he "didn't understand" Americans and did not have any American friends. A later FBI report recorded Tamerlan stating that was a misquote, and that most of his friends were American. He added that he abstained from drinking and smoking, because "God says no to alcohol" and that "there are no values anymore. People can't control themselves". Rule changes disqualified all non-US citizens from Golden Gloves boxing, ending Tsarnaev's boxing career and Olympic hopes.

In the spring of 2010, Katherine Russell became pregnant with Tsarnaev's child. Russell dropped out of college at the end of her junior year and married Tsarnaev on June 21, 2010, in a 15-minute ceremony in an office at the Masjid Al Quran in the Dorchester area of Greater Boston. The couple's daughter was born in October 2010.

Tsarnaev first came to the attention of Russian security forces in December 2010 when William Plotnikov was briefly detained in Dagestan and forced to disclose his social networking contacts in North America with ties to Russia.

=== 2011 ===
In early 2011, Russia's Federal Security Service (FSB) told the Federal Bureau of Investigation (FBI) that Tsarnaev was a follower of Islamic extremism. The FSB said that he was preparing to leave the United States to travel to the Russian region to join unspecified underground groups. The FBI initially denied that it had contacted Tsarnaev, but then confirmed that it had after Tsarnaev's mother talked about the FBI's contacts with her son on RT. The FBI said that it interviewed him and relatives of his, but did not find any terrorist activity. At that point, the FBI asked the FSB for more information, but the Russians did not respond to the American request and the FBI closed the case.

Tsarnaev's mother said that FBI agents had told her they feared her son was an "extremist leader", and that he was getting information from "extremist sites". She said Tsarnaev had been under FBI surveillance for at least three years and that "they were controlling every step of him". The FBI denied this accusation. Tsarnaev "vaguely discussed" jihad during a 2011 phone call with his mother that was taped by the FSB, and intelligence officials also discovered text messages in which his mother discussed how he was ready to die for Islam. In late 2011, the Central Intelligence Agency put both Tsarnaev and his mother on its Terrorist Identities Datamart Environment database.

==== Alleged involvement in Waltham triple murder ====
Two Jewish men, Erik Weissman and Raphael Teken, as well as their roommate Brendan Mess, were killed in a triple homicide in Waltham, Massachusetts on September 11, 2011. It was reported on April 23, 2013 that local authorities believed Tsarnaev may have been responsible for the triple homicide, and that they and the FBI were investigating the possibility. A search warrant affidavit that was partially unsealed in November 2019 provided further details about Tsarnaev's alleged connection to the crime.

=== 2012 ===
==== Visit to Russia ====
Tsarnaev traveled to Russia through Moscow's Domodedovo International Airport in January 2012, and returned to the U.S. in July 2012.

Tsarnaev arrived in Dagestan around March 2012, and his father arrived there in May. U.S. House Homeland Security Chairman Michael McCaul said he believed that Tsarnaev received training during his trip and became radicalized. In an early report, Dagestan's interior minister Abdurashid Magomedov said through a spokesman that Tsarnaev "did not have contact with the [Islamist] underground during his visit".

Tsarnaev's maternal third cousin, Magomed Kartashov, is a figure in Dagestan's Islamist community. Zubeidat Tsarnaeva confirmed that they "became very close." Kartashov's Islamist organization, "The Union of the Just," advocates Islam as a political system under sharia law. Kartashov later stated the Boston bombing was "good" in that it would increase converts to Islam similarly to the attacks of September 11.

According to media reports, Tsarnaev was seen by Dagestan police, who were conducting surveillance, making six visits to a known Islamic militant in a Salafi mosque in Makhachkala founded by an associate of Ayman Zawahiri. According to Russian investigative newspaper Novaya Gazeta, quoting unnamed Russian security sources, Tsarnaev was linked to 23-year-old William Plotnikov, an ethnic Russian-Tatar Islamic militant and Canadian citizen, with whom he communicated via online social networking sites. Tsarnaev had also visited Toronto, where Plotnikov lived with his parents. Once in Dagestan, Tsarnaev is said to have met on several occasions with Makhmud Mansur Nidal, a 19-year-old Dagestani-Palestinian man. Nidal was under close surveillance by Dagestan's anti-extremism unit for six months as a suspected recruiter for Islamist insurgents before the police killed him. According to Novaya Gazeta, Tsarnaev had sought to join the local insurgency and was put on a months-long period of 'quarantine' (a clearance check by insurgents looking for infiltrating double agents). After Tsarnaev's alleged contacts were both killed, he "got frightened and fled". In an apparent hurry that Russian authorities considered suspicious, he left Russia in July two days after Plotnikov was killed and did not wait to pick up his new Russian passport (which was ostensibly one of his main reasons for coming to Russia in the first place).

In an interview, Tsarnaev's father later said he had to force his son to return to the United States to complete his U.S. citizenship application after Tsarnaev tried to convince his family to allow him to stay in Dagestan for good.

==== Return to U.S. ====
Tsarnaev returned to the U.S. on July 17, 2012, having grown a long, thick beard and wearing kohl around his eyes as a sign of his religious devotion to Sunni Islam and the prophet Muhammad. His life took on an "increasingly puritanical religious tone" with "Islamist certainty".

After his return to the U.S., Tsarnaev created a YouTube channel with playlist links to two videos which were tagged under a category labeled "Terrorists", including one to Dagestani Islamic militant Amir Abu Dujana (Gadzhimurad Dolgatov, also known as 'Robin Hood', a commander of a small group in the Kizilyurt district, who was killed in battle in late December 2012); the videos were later deleted. CNN and the SITE Institute found a screen grab of one of the videos, which featured members of the militant Islamist group Caucasus Emirate from the North Caucasus. He also linked to jihadi videos on YouTube, including ones by radical cleric Feiz Mohammad; in one video, voices can be heard singing in Arabic as bombs explode. He frequently read extremist sites, including Al-Qaeda in the Arabian Peninsula's Inspire online magazine.

Tsarnaev applied for U.S. citizenship on September 5, 2012, but Homeland Security held up the application for "additional review" because they found a record of the 2011 FBI interview of him.

Tsarnaev was pulled over by police in Boston, Brookline, and Cambridge at least nine times in four years.

In November 2012, Tsarnaev reportedly confronted a shopkeeper at a Middle Eastern grocery store in Cambridge near a mosque where he sometimes prayed after seeing a sign there advertising Thanksgiving turkeys. He said "This is kuffar"—an Arabic reference to non-Muslims—"that's not right!" Also in November 2012, Tsarnaev stood up and challenged a sermon in which the speaker said that, just like "we all celebrate the birthday of the Prophet, we can also celebrate July 4 and Thanksgiving," according to Yusufi Vali, a mosque spokesman.

=== 2013 ===
In January 2013, Tsarnaev disrupted a Martin Luther King Jr. Day sermon at a mosque in Cambridge. He objected to the speaker's comparison of Muhammad to Martin Luther King Jr. Tsarnaev was shouted down by members of the congregation and was later asked not to return to the mosque unless he was willing to refrain from shouting during sermons. The mosque said Tsarnaev had disrupted a sermon previously.

On February 6, 2013, Tsarnaev reportedly purchased 48 mortars containing explosive powder at a store in Seabrook, New Hampshire.

On April 14, 2013, the day before the bombings, Tsarnaev reportedly received electronic IED components that were sent to him by mail; he had ordered the components online.

== 2013 Boston Marathon bombing and aftermath ==
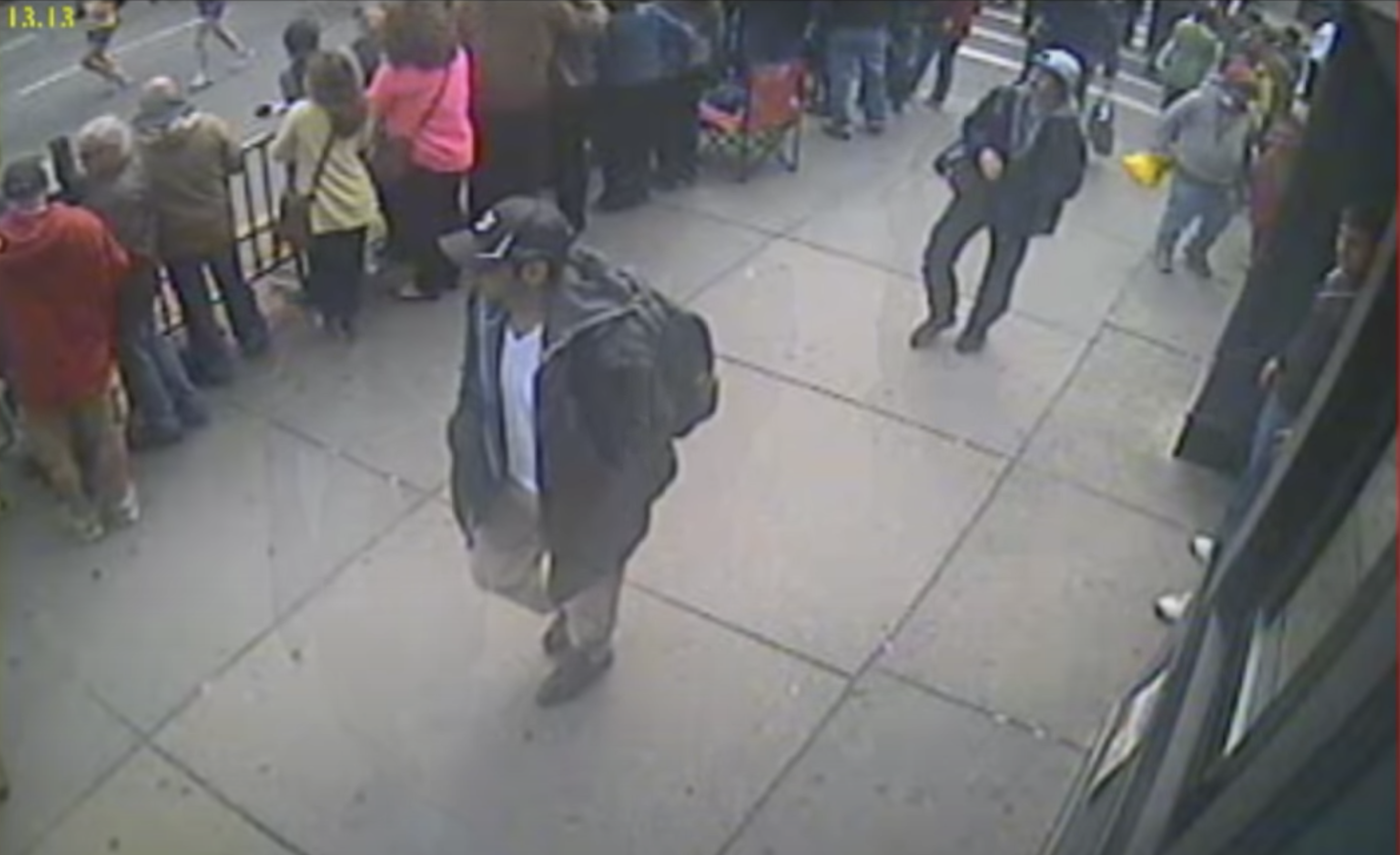
Tamerlan Tsarnaev (front) and Dzhokhar Tsarnaev (rear) moments before the bombings

According to Dzhokhar Tsarnaev, he and Tamerlan Tsarnaev used pressure cooker bombs to commit the Boston Marathon bombing on April 15, 2013. One bomb was placed at the Boston Marathon finish line, while the other was placed outside the Forum restaurant. The bombs were detonated at 2:49 pm. The bombing killed three people and injured hundreds of others.

At 5:00 p.m. on April 18, 2013, the FBI released images of two suspects carrying backpacks and requested the public's help in identifying them. As seen on video, the suspects stayed to observe the chaos after the explosions, then walked away casually. The public sent authorities a deluge of photographs and videos. The FBI-released images depicted Tamerlan and Dzhokhar Tsarnaev.

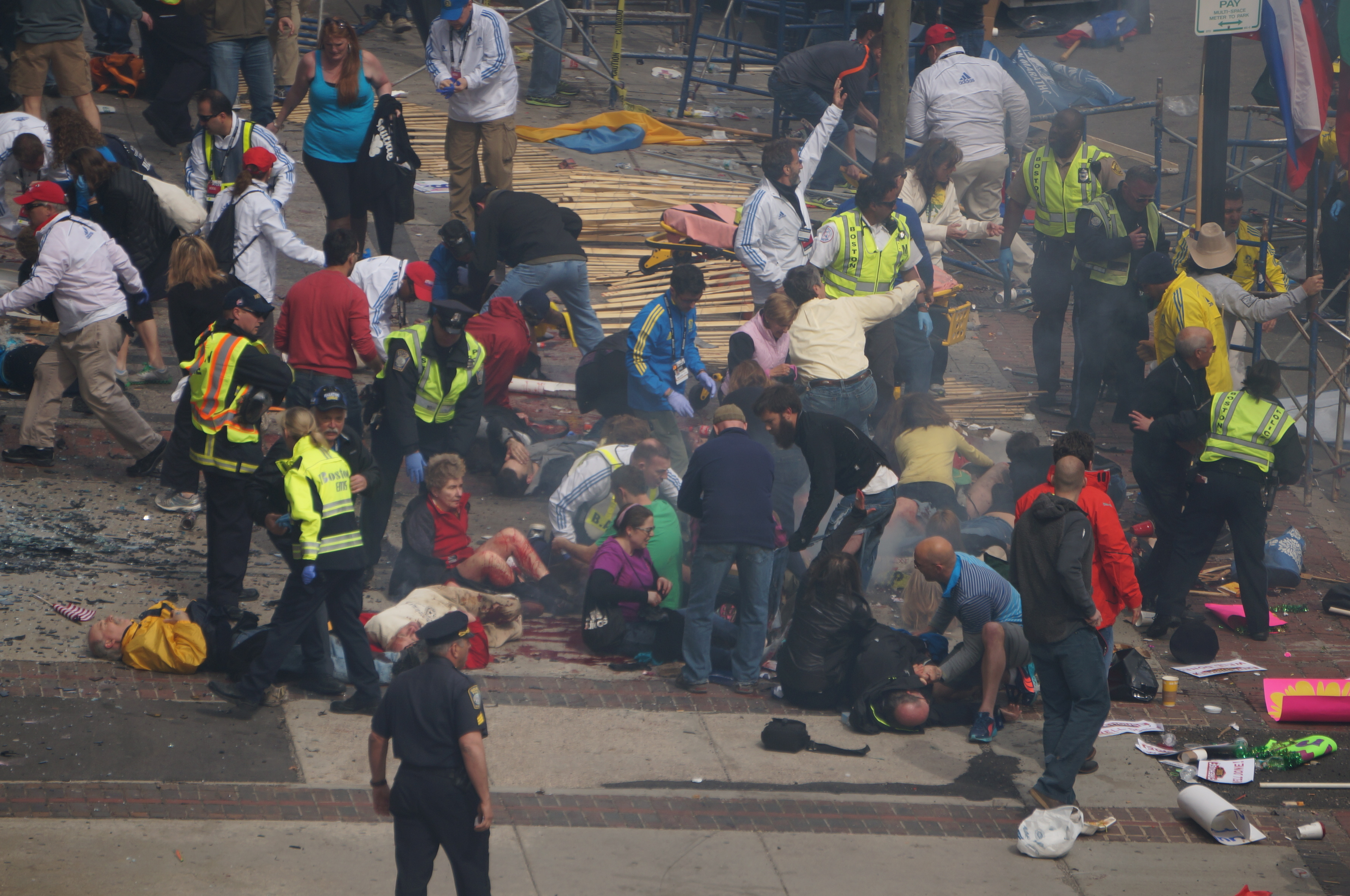
Boston Marathon bombing

Hours after the FBI released their photos, Tamerlan and Dzhokhar Tsarnaev visited their family's apartment in Cambridge. There, they obtained five improvised explosive devices (IEDs), ammunition, a semiautomatic handgun, and a machete. The two brothers then drove to the Massachusetts Institute of Technology.

On April 18, 2013 at 10:25 p.m., the Tsarnaev brothers ambushed Sean A. Collier of the Massachusetts Institute of Technology Police Department and shot him six times. The two brothers were attempting to steal Collier's Smith & Wesson M&P45 sidearm, which they could not free from his holster because of its security retention system. Collier, aged 27, was seated in his police car near Building 32 on the Massachusetts Institute of Technology campus. He died shortly after the shooting.

The brothers then carjacked a Mercedes-Benz M-Class SUV in the Allston-Brighton neighborhood of Boston. Tamerlan Tsarnaev took the vehicle's owner, Chinese national Dun "Danny" Meng (Chinese: 孟盾), hostage and informed him that he (Tsarnaev) was responsible for the Boston Marathon bombing and for shooting Collier. Dzhokhar Tsarnaev followed them in their green Honda Civic, but later joined them in the Mercedes-Benz. Interrogation later revealed that the brothers "decided spontaneously" that they wanted to go to New York and bomb Times Square.

The Tsarnaev brothers forced Meng to use his ATM cards to obtain $800 in cash (equivalent to $1,106 in 2025). They transferred objects to the Mercedes-Benz and one brother followed it in their Civic, for which an all-points bulletin was issued. The Tsarnaev brothers then drove to a Shell gas station on Memorial Drive in Cambridge to purchase gasoline for the long drive to Times Square. While Dzhokhar went inside the Shell station to pay for food, Meng—fearing that the suspects would harm him during the trip—escaped from the Mercedes, ran across the street to a Mobil gas station, and asked a clerk to call 911. Meng's cell phone remained in the Mercedes; this allowed the police to track the phone and focus their search on Watertown.

=== Death ===
After being spotted by a police officer, the Tsarnaev brothers engaged in a shootout with Watertown Police in the early morning hours of April 19, 2013. An estimated 200 to 300 shots were fired. The suspects shot 56 times, detonated at least one pressure cooker bomb, and threw five "crude grenades", three of which exploded. According to Watertown Police Chief Edward Deveau, the brothers had an "arsenal of guns". Tamerlan Tsarnaev was wounded by gunfire. Tamerlan eventually ran out of ammunition and threw his empty Ruger pistol at Watertown PD Sergeant Jeffrey Pugliese, Tamerlan walked towards the sergeant unhanded without stopping, the sergeant then tackled him with assistance from Sergeant MacLellan. Dzhokhar then drove the stolen SUV toward Tamerlan and the police, who unsuccessfully tried to drag Tamerlan out of the car's path and handcuff him.

Tamerlan Tsarnaev was struck by the vehicle his brother was driving and pulled into the wheel well. Due to his brother's attempt to speed away, Tsarnaev was rapidly and violently dragged between the ground and the bottom of the car. One officer commented that the entirety of the right side of his upper torso was blown open by the force, while his chest and face were crushed and battered against the ground. He was dragged approximately 20 yards before disconnecting from the wheel well, and he was then thrown into the middle of the road before police arrested him.

Paramedic Michael Sullivan, who treated Tsarnaev after the shootout, stated that Tsarnaev angrily resisted medical treatment as he was being driven to the hospital; Sullivan asserted that he lifted himself from the stretcher and screamed loudly. Tamerlan was taken to Beth Israel Deaconess Medical Center, where, despite efforts to revive him, he was pronounced dead from blood loss and cardiac and respiratory arrest at 1:35 a.m. His death certificate gave the cause of death as gunshot wounds to the torso and extremities, as well as blunt trauma to the head and torso.

== Later developments ==
Officials in Boston, Cambridge, at a state prison, and in over 120 other U.S. and Canadian locations refused to allow Tsarnaev's body to be buried in their jurisdictions.

On May 9, Worcester police announced that Tsarnaev's body had been buried in an undisclosed location. It was later reported that Tsarnaev was buried in a small Muslim cemetery, Al-Barzakh Cemetery, in Doswell, Virginia. The burial was arranged by Martha Mullen of Richmond, Virginia, who said she was appalled by the protests at the funeral home, which she said "portrayed America at its worst" and wanted to find a way to end the impasse. She contacted Islamic Funeral Services of Virginia, which agreed to provide an unmarked plot in their cemetery. The funeral agency released a statement saying, "What Tsarnaev did is between him and God. We strongly disagree with his violent actions, but that does not release us from our obligation to return his body to the earth." Caroline County Sheriff Tony Lippa said the burial was legal. Locals, as well as the imam of the Virginia Islamic Centre, condemned the secretive burial.

Dzhokhar Tsarnaev later admitted to his role in the bombing. He implicated his brother Tamerlan, asserting that he was following Tamerlan's lead. Dzhokhar Tsarnaev also stated that he and his brother intended to detonate explosives in Times Square in New York City. On April 8, 2015, Dzhokhar Tsarnaev was convicted of all 30 criminal charges against him in connection with the Boston Marathon bombing. On May 15, 2015, he was sentenced to death.

== Family members ==
=== Anzor Tsarnaev ===
After moving to the United States, Anzor Tsarnaev worked as a backyard mechanic. Following the Boston Marathon bombing, a relative described Anzor as a "traditional Muslim" who objected to extremism.

=== Zubeidat Tsarnaeva ===
Zubeidat Tsarnaeva is the mother of Tamerlan and Dzhokhar Tsarnaev. In photos of her as a younger woman, she wore western-style clothing. She came to the U.S. in 2002 and became a licensed aesthetician. After deciding she could no longer work in a business that served men, she started working from home, where clients saw her become more radical and promote 9/11 conspiracy theories.

Tsarnaeva has been quoted as saying that she urged Tamerlan Tsarnaev to embrace Islam in 2008 because she was concerned about his drinking, smoking, and pursuit of women. She said he began to read more about it on the Internet. She also urged him to quit boxing because Islam prohibits hitting someone in the face.

Tsarnaeva discussed jihad during a 2011 phone call with Tamerlan Tsarnaev that was taped by a Russian government agency, and intelligence officials also discovered text messages in which she discussed how Tsarnaev was ready to die for Islam.

Both Tsarnaeva and Tamerlan Tsarnaev were the subject of a Russian Intelligence inquiry to the U.S. government in 2011 because of what the Russians perceived as extremist Islamic views. She was interviewed by the FBI who found nothing to pursue at the time. In late 2011, the CIA added both Tsarnaeva and Tamerlan Tsarnaev to its Terrorist Identities Datamart Environment database.

Ruslan Tsarni told the AP from his home in Maryland that he believed his former sister-in-law had a "big-time influence" on Tsarnaev's growing embrace of his Muslim faith and decision to quit boxing and school.

In early 2012, Zubeidat Tsarnaeva was arrested for shoplifting $1,624 worth of women's clothing from Lord and Taylor in Natick, Massachusetts. She left the U.S. for Russia and did not appear in court.

Anzor and Zubeidat Tsarnaeva divorced in 2011 after twenty-five years of marriage. The couple had no personal property or real estate to divide and listed no retirement or pension benefits. They gave the reason for their split as "irretrievable breakdown of the marriage" with "no chance of reconciling our differences". The mother's move toward more Islamic extremism was reportedly a factor in the breakdown of the marriage.

Zubeidat Tsarnaeva has stated in TV interviews that her sons did not commit the Boston Marathon bombing and that they were framed by the FBI.

=== Ruslan Tsarni ===
Ruslan Tsarni is the paternal uncle of Tamerlan Tsarnaev, and the brother of Anzor Tsarnaev. He was trained as a lawyer, and moved to Washington State in 1995. He returned to Kyrgyzstan by the end of the decade, and then returned to the United States, settling in Montgomery County, Maryland.

During the manhunt for the brothers, he was interviewed by the FBI. When the media arrived at his home, he denounced the actions of his nephews and called on them to turn themselves in. He also buried the remains of Tsarnaev.

=== Katherine Russell ===
Tamerlan Tsarnaev's widow, Katherine Russell (a.k.a. Karima Tsarnaeva or Katherine Tsarnaeva), was born on February 6, 1989, in Texas. She was raised in Rhode Island. She attended North Kingstown High School, and graduated in 2007.

Tsarnaev and Russell met in 2007 in a nightclub, soon after she started as a communications major at Suffolk University. Friends said he would shout at her that she was a "slut". They described fights in which Tsarnaev would "fly into rages and sometimes throw furniture or throw things". Tamerlan was known to cheat on Russell, and a friend of Russell's told her mother that the relationship was abusive. At Tsarnaev's insistence, Russell converted to Islam in 2008, adopted the hijab, and chose the name Karima.

Russell dropped out of college in the spring of 2010 after she became pregnant. The couple married on June 21, 2010, in a 15-minute ceremony in a Dorchester mosque. The couple's daughter was born in October 2010. At the time of the bombings on April 15, 2013, Russell was living with her husband and daughter in the Norfolk Street family home in Cambridge.

After her husband's death, Russell retreated to her parents' home in Rhode Island. Her parents released a statement saying "[o]ur daughter has lost her husband today, the father of her child. We cannot begin to comprehend how this horrible tragedy occurred. In the aftermath of the Patriots' Day horror, we know that we never really knew Tamerlan Tsarnaev. Our hearts are sickened by the knowledge of the horror he has inflicted". Russell refused to take custody of her husband's remains and reverted to using her maiden name.

Investigators found bomb-making instructions, downloaded from Inspire magazine, on Russell's computer. Dzhokhar Tsarnaev told the FBI that he and his brother had learned to make bombs by reading Inspire, but it was not clear who downloaded the files. Her web history included searches for "If your husband becomes a shahid, what are the rewards for you?" and "the rewards for the wife of Mujahedeen." The FBI collected Russell's DNA after female DNA was found on bomb fragments; neither her DNA nor her fingerprints matched those on the bombs.

No charges were filed against Russell in connection with the Boston Marathon bombing.

As of June 12, 2015, Russell lived on "a quiet street in New Jersey" with her daughter.

== Biographical portrayals ==
Year	Title	Portrayed by	Notes
2017	Stronger	Jordan Lazieh	Drama/biography of a marathon spectator
2016	Patriots Day	Themo Melikidze	Thriller drama film about Boston Marathon bombing
