= Ibragim Todashev =

Chechen criminal suspect killed by the FBI (1985–2013)

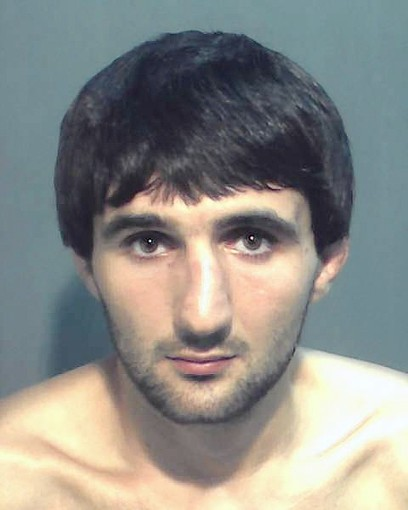
- Florida booking photo from Orange County on May 4, 2013
- Born: 22 September 1985; Grozny, Chechen-Ingush ASSR, Russian SFSR, Soviet Union
- Died: 22 May 2013 (aged 27); Orlando, Florida, United States
- Cause of death: Gunshot

Ibragim Abdulbakievich Todashev (Ибрагим Абдулбакиевич Тодашев; 22 September 1985 – 22 May 2013) was a Chechen-born former mixed martial artist, former amateur boxer and friend of Boston Marathon bomber Tamerlan Tsarnaev.

He was shot dead at his apartment in Orlando, Florida, by FBI agent Aaron McFarlane on May 22, 2013, after being interviewed there for about eight hours. He had allegedly attacked the agent, with a pipe or stick, while writing a statement about the April 15, 2013, Boston Marathon bombings and a triple homicide that took place in Waltham, Massachusetts, on September 11, 2011. The investigators involved in the incident said that Todashev had implicated both himself and Tsarnaev in the Waltham murders before he was killed.

The FBI blocked the release of the autopsy report for approximately nine months, released inconsistent information about his death, and did not give the family access to some of the evidence, finally releasing Todashev's clothing and some other evidence nine years later. The family and civil rights groups alleged there were civil rights violations and excessive use of force involved in his death. On March 25, 2014, the autopsy report was released and the Florida State Attorney and the U.S. Department of Justice (DOJ) announced they had concluded the agent had fired in self-defense and would not face criminal charges. According to the autopsy report, Todashev was shot seven times and there was no evidence of the shots having been fired from close range.

== Life ==
Ibragim Todashev was born on September 22, 1985, in the Chechen-Ingush capital Grozny during the Soviet era, as the eldest of 12 children of Abdulbaki (or Abdul-Baki) Todashev and his two wives. During the 1990s, his family fled war-torn Chechnya to Russia's Saratov Oblast. They lived there until around 2006 before moving back to Grozny, where his father became a high-ranking pro-Moscow official in the city administration in 2008.

Todashev moved to the U.S. to study English on a J-1 non-immigrant visa, after four years of study in classes at Saratov State University and Chechen State University, as part of a student exchange program with Russia. He then applied for and was granted asylum in 2008 and permanent residence in March 2013. His father said his son had no reason to fear "oppression" back home as "he was too young to fight in the war [in Chechnya], and he has nothing to fear here now" from the authorities. He said: "Out of fear of the lawlessness in Chechnya, I sent him to the U.S. because it seemed like the safest country at the time."

In the United States, Todashev married an Armenian American, Reni Manukyan, who said she met him in 2010 through a mutual friend in Boston; Manukyan separated from Todashev in November 2012, but they had kept in regular contact with each other, and she was still supporting him with money. Todashev was an amateur boxer before turning to mixed martial arts (MMA) in the United States, but he quit his professional MMA career due to a serious knee injury. His father said that after that, his son had held various jobs in the Boston area before eventually moving to Florida.

His father said in an interview for Russia Today that his son was a "very calm" person who would never hurt anyone. Todashev's former MMA training partner, however, described him as a gifted athlete but also a "hothead". In 2010, the Boston Police Department detained Todashev for a violent road rage incident in Downtown Crossing; the police report states that the officers "witnessed several people struggling to restrain a white male, later determined to be the subject, Ibragim Todashev. Officers heard Todashev yell, 'You say something about my mother, I will kill you!' Officers struggled to physically restrain and handcuff Todashev." On May 4, 2013, shortly before his death, he was also briefly arrested by the Orange County Sheriff's Office in Orange County, Florida, after he got into a fight with two strangers during a dispute over a parking space at an outlet mall, knocking one of them unconscious and then leaving the scene (the man, who was hospitalized with serious head injuries but did not press charges, later said he was shocked "how accurate and quick his punches were" and "thought he was wearing brass knuckles, but it was just his fist"). The responding sheriff's deputy chased down Todashev's car, ordered him out at gunpoint and arrested him; the affidavit states that "Todashev said he was only fighting to protect his knee because he had surgery in March."

At the time of the shooting that killed him, Todashev was free on $3,500 bail for the Orange County incident, facing charges of aggravated battery. While his girlfriend had been ordered to return to Russia by an immigration judge, federal immigration officials granted her permission to stay in the United States for another year and released her from detention in August. After speaking to reporter Susan Zalkind about Todashev's death and relationship with the FBI, she was arrested and deported to Russia in October 2013. Todashev's friend who was also a housemate, Ashurmamad Miraliev, briefly charged in an unrelated case, was ordered to leave the country and left soon afterwards.

=== Mixed martial arts record ===
Professional record breakdown
| 2 matches | 1 win | 1 loss |
| By knockout | 0 | 1 |
| By submission | 1 | 0 |

| Res. | Record | Opponent | Method | Event | Date | Round | Time | Location | Notes |
|---|---|---|---|---|---|---|---|---|---|
| Win | 1–1 | Bradford May | Submission (guillotine choke) | RFC 27: Showtime | July 27, 2012 | 1 | 2:29 | Tampa, Florida, United States | |
| Loss | 0–1 | Jimmy Davidson | TKO (referee stoppage) | AFO - Thanksgiving Massacre 2 | November 25, 2009 | 3 | 2:49 | Quincy, Massachusetts, United States | |

== 2011 Waltham triple murder ==
A triple murder was committed in Waltham, Massachusetts, on the evening of September 11, 2011. Three men, Brendan Mess, Erik Weissman, and Raphael Teken, were murdered in Mess's apartment. All had their throats slit from ear to ear, with such great force that they were nearly decapitated. Illegal marijuana worth thousands of dollars was left covering their bodies, and $5,000 was left at the scene. The local district attorney said that it appeared that the killer and the victims knew each other, and that the murders were not random.

The Boston Globe reported that Tamerlan Tsarnaev, the deceased suspect in the April 2013 Boston Marathon bombings, had once introduced murder victim Brendan Mess as his best friend. After the bombings and subsequent revelations of Tsarnaev's personal life, the Waltham murders case was reexamined in April 2013 with Tsarnaev as a new suspect. Todashev's friendship with Tsarnaev then led to him being questioned for potential connection with the murders and other actions involving Tsarnaev.

== Todashev's questioning and death ==
On the afternoon of May 22, 2013, law enforcement officers, including FBI special agent Aaron McFarlane from the Boston field office and two Massachusetts State Police (MSP) troopers, Curtis Cinelli and Joel Gagne, arrived at Ibragim Todashev's apartment in Orlando, Florida, and interviewed Todashev for approximately eight hours in his living room. NPR reporter Susan Zalkind stated that Todashev's friend Khusen Taramov waited outside Todashev's apartment during the interrogation, and was told to leave an hour before Todashev was shot. According to Todashev's father, Abdulbaki, the questioning took place two days before his scheduled flight to Russia; Abdulbaki's American attorney Eric Ludin said Ibragim Todashev had undergone multiple prior interrogations in Florida and was promised this would be the last one, and had canceled a planned trip to Chechnya earlier in May on the advice of the FBI. Todashev was questioned by the FBI agent regarding the 2011 Waltham murders and his connections to the Boston bombings suspect Tamerlan Tsarnaev; both Todashev and Tsarnaev had trained at the Wai Kru MMA Gym and lived close to each other in Cambridge, Massachusetts. The investigators later said that Todashev implicated both himself and Tamerlan Tsarnaev in the murders during the questioning soon after midnight. They reported that Todashev was beginning to write a formal statement when he asked to take a break, and then suddenly attacked the agent. Todashev was shot multiple times, and killed.

Officials initially claimed that Todashev picked up a knife or attempted to grab a samurai sword from the wall, but later said that it was unclear whether this was the case; one source said it was "a knife or a pipe or something". A number of later reports said that he was unarmed. Some earlier accounts implied that the FBI agent was alone with Todashev at the time of the shooting. Following Todashev's death, his father showed photographs to reporters in Moscow that he said demonstrated his son had been shot at point-blank range in the head. According to the account of an unnamed law enforcement official, Todashev knocked the interrogating agent to the ground with a table, and then lunged at him with a metal pole, or possibly a broomstick. In this account there was one detective in the room (who did not fire) besides the FBI agent. The agent sustained minor injuries requiring stitches. An account given by former FBI Assistant Director for Public Information John Miller said that an MSP trooper

"noticed that Todashev was getting more and more agitated. Rather than alert the agent and tip off Todashev that they sensed something was about to happen, [the trooper] texted the agent and [wrote], 'Be careful, I think this guy is becoming more agitated'. As the agent looked down at that text, that's when the table went over, Todashev came over the table and picked up apparently a metal broom handle or some object like that [...] and charged the agent. The agent [w]as knocked back, came up with his gun, fired two or three times. Todashev came back at him and he fired more times."

In June 2013, authorities said that the agent had fired six times.

A police report stated that the FBI confiscated "some kind of stick" along with a computer and some other items. The FBI established a post-shooting incident-review team to investigate the shooting.

Todashev's body was flown to Russia on June 20 by his American widow and his father; he was buried in a Muslim cemetery in Grozny on June 29. On July 16, the release of Todashev's autopsy report, completed by a Florida medical examiner's office, was blocked by the FBI because the "case was still under active investigation".

=== Calls for investigation and allegations of civil rights violations and excessive use of force ===
On May 29, 2013, the FBI confirmed that Todashev was unarmed and not grabbing a samurai sword as some earlier reports had said, while saying: "The FBI takes very seriously any shooting incidents involving our agents, and as such, we have an effective, time-tested process for addressing them internally. The review process is thorough and objective and conducted as expeditiously as possible under the circumstances."

On the same day, the Council on American–Islamic Relations (CAIR), an American Islamic civil liberties group, held a news conference in Orlando at which it presented photographs of Todashev's body which it said showed that he was shot seven times, once in the head. CAIR asked the DOJ for an investigation separate from the FBI investigation into the shooting to determine whether the FBI violated Todashev's civil rights.

On May 30, The Washington Post published an editorial arguing that "answers are needed" about Todashev's death: "With the eyes of the world once again on the United States' response to an act of terrorism and its treatment of foreign nationals, the last thing the U.S. government needs to do is fuel wild conspiracy theories by releasing too little information or investigating too slowly."

On June 4, the American Civil Liberties Union (ACLU) called for an independent investigation into the shooting. Michael German, a former FBI agent and ACLU's counsel on national security, immigration and privacy, said: "What became concerning is that different stories... were coming out. They need to correct the record—both for the protection of the people in the community and for the protection of the law enforcement officers."

A DOJ spokesman said that they would determine whether an investigation by the DOJ Civil Rights Division was warranted. In early August, the DOJ finished a preliminary probe into Todashev's death. Executive director of CAIR-Florida Hassan Shibly said: "It was the FBI agent who shot all of the bullets. If this were a survival shooting, typically all of the officers will draw their weapons," adding that "sympathetic" federal sources within the DOJ and FBI assured CAIR that Todashev was unarmed.

On August 1, the Florida Department of Law Enforcement declined the request to conduct its own investigation, saying it would be inappropriate for a state agency to intervene. The ACLU executive director Howard Simon said: "The FBI has offered completely incompatible explanations, they have failed to explain how these inconsistent stories found their way into newspaper accounts of the shooting, and have not offered any clarifying comment about what really happened." On August 10, Florida's top prosecutor, State Attorney Jeffrey L. Ashton, announced that he had changed his mind and decided to launch an independent review of the shooting; Ashton said there was no timetable as to when he would complete his review and there would be no further public comment about the matter until it was completed.

Reports after the shooting noted that Aaron McFarlane, the agent who killed Todashev, had been the subject of two police-brutality lawsuits and four internal-affairs investigations while at the Oakland Police Department, and had claimed his Fifth Amendment right against self-incrimination at a police corruption trial. McFarlane had retired from the Oakland police in 2004, claiming medical disability, before joining the FBI in 2008, and had continued to receive medical disability payments. After the shooting, Oakland officials launched a probe into the payments.

=== Criticism from Russia ===
When the Russian embassy in Washington, DC, learned of Todashev's shooting, it asked the U.S. government for the relevant documentation, including the autopsy report as well as information about the firearms used in the incident. The autopsy report has remained sealed, and an FBI spokesman said that no documents relating to the case would be provided to Russia until the FBI completes its own investigation. The FBI's refusal to provide details on the shooting contrasts sharply with previous shootings involving its agents.

The shooting was condemned by the Head of the Chechen Republic, Ramzan Kadyrov, who said that Ibragim Todashev was a "good boy" and his father Abdulbaki, who works in Kadyrov's government as a department head in the mayor's office in Grozny, is a "decent and educated person". According to Reuters, Abdulbaki Todashev and Kadyrov were said to be on close terms. Kadyrov said "the guy [Ibragim Todashev] was killed for no reason" and "without justification" in "reprisal by special services". Kadyrov's press office also released a statement of him claiming that Ibragim Todashev wanted to go home because of "the harassment of Chechens in America" and criticizing the alleged "double standards" of the White House in regards to murder and terrorism.

On May 30, at a press conference in Moscow, Todashev's father, Abdulbaki, who had previously stated that he believes his son was tortured before he died, said photographs of the corpse showed six shots to the body and a "control shot" (a Russian phrase for an execution by a point-blank shot to the head). According to his father, the FBI "bandits" allegedly executed his "100% unarmed" son to silence him for an unspecified reason. In an interview after the press conference, he said that it appeared that his son had been shot by more than one agent, both from the front and the back. According to Maxim Shevchenko, a prominent Russian state journalist and member of Vladimir Putin's presidential Council for Civil Society and Human Rights who conducted the conference, the photographs were taken at a Muslim mortuary by Ibragim Todashev's friend Khusen Taramov, who has spoken to the press about being earlier interviewed by the FBI along with Todashev. On June 25, Abdulbaki Todashev said he plans to sue the U.S. authorities over what he described as the "extrajudicial execution" of his son. On August 5, he arrived in the U.S. on a tourist visa with this intent. Todashev claimed not receiving assistance from Kadyrov and the Russian state (besides some moral support), but is being supported by his son's estranged widow as well as CAIR and the Florida ACLU.

Russian state news agency ITAR-TASS writer Ivan Sukhov commented that "the criminal side of the story with Todashev is ignored in Russia" but "there is a high probability that the triple murder, of which Ibragim Todashev is suspected, will be confirmed – and then even the fact that his father works at a Russian municipal agency will not be seen as an extenuating circumstance for those who are now trying to publicly defend him and who proceed from the fact that Americans are enemies even if you live among them."

== Release of autopsy report, closure of the case, and aftermath ==
On March 25, 2014, the autopsy report was released and the Florida State Attorney and the DOJ both announced they had concluded the agent had fired in self-defense and decided they would not bring criminal charges against him. According to the autopsy report, Todashev had been shot seven times and there was no evidence of the shots having been fired from close range.

The blood-stained clothing and some other belongings of Todashev that had been taken as evidence were returned to the family in 2022, nine years after he was killed. The family had not previously had access to the materials. Todashev's father Abdulbaki Todashev came from Russia to Florida to collect the items and repeated his allegations of FBI misconduct, calling for further investigation. Hassan Shibly, the attorney for Abdulbaki Todashev, said "The killing of Ibragim and subsequent lack of accountability for law enforcement perfectly reflects everything that is wrong with the culture of police brutality in America. Ibragim Todashev was unarmed when he was killed in cold blood by FBI agent Aaron McFarlane. McFarlane had no business being an FBI agent in the first place."
