= Federal Correctional Institution, Coleman =

Prison complexes in Florida, US

Coordinates: 28°45′35″N 82°0′49″W

FCI, Coleman Low & Medium
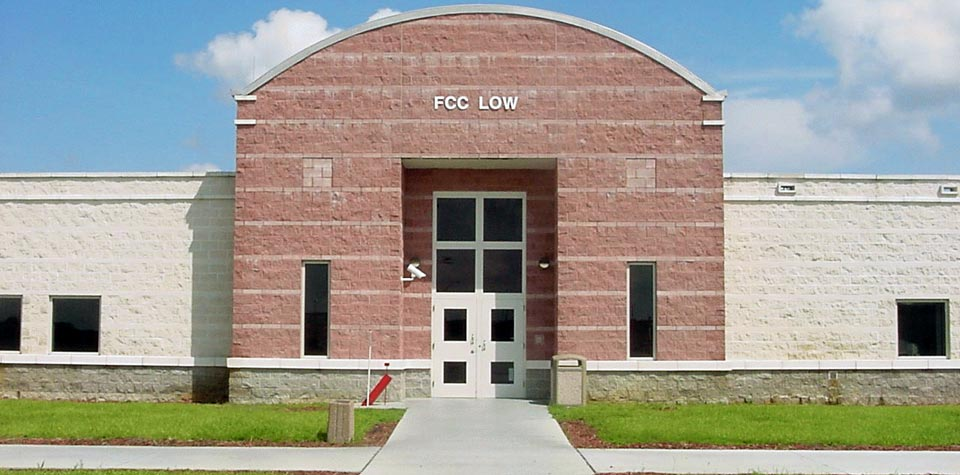
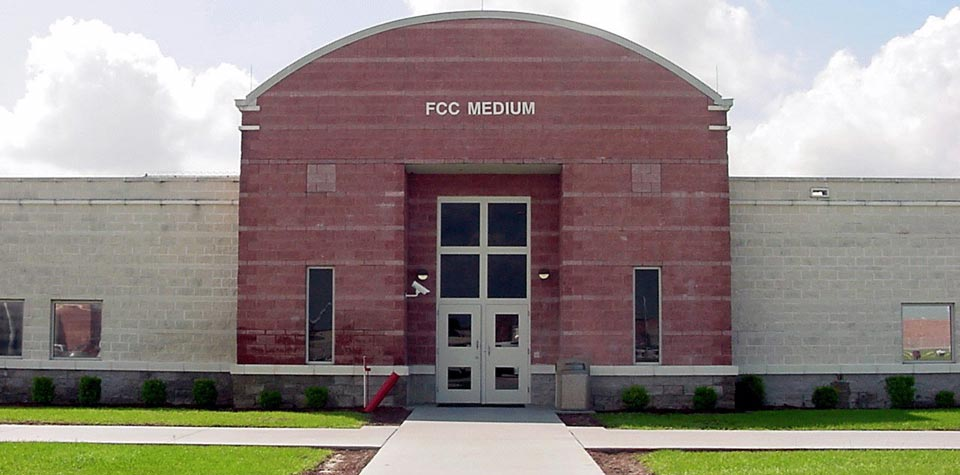
- FCI, Coleman Low pictured. FCI, Coleman Medium pictured.
- Interactive map of FCI, Coleman Low & Medium
- Location: Sumter County, Florida
- Status: Operational
- Security class: Low security Medium security
- Population: 1,860
- Managed by: Federal Bureau of Prisons

Federal Correctional Institution (FCI), Coleman refers to either of two separate and distinct FCIs housing male offenders, namely Federal Correctional Institution, Coleman Low or Federal Correctional Institution, Coleman Medium. Both institutions form part of the Federal Correctional Complex (FCC) Coleman and are operated by the Federal Bureau of Prisons, a division of the United States Department of Justice.

FCC Coleman is located in central Florida approximately 50 miles northwest of Orlando, 60 miles northeast of Tampa, and 35 miles south of Ocala.

== Notable incidents ==
In early 2000, federal investigators discovered that inmate Roy Ageloff was directing fraudulent activities from FCI Coleman. Ageloff, a former stockbroker, was convicted of money laundering in 1998 for masterminding a securities manipulation scheme in the 1990s which swindled thousands of investors out of millions of dollars. An investigation uncovered that Ageloff was continuing to give his co-conspirators, including his brother, instructions regarding the management, transfer, concealment and investment of proceeds from the scheme. Ageloff gave these instructions during prison visits, recorded telephone conversations, and through prison e-mail. Ageloff's co-conspirators continued to receive criminal proceeds in the form of cash payments and checks. In August 2000, Ageloff pleaded guilty to federal racketeering charges and was subsequently sentenced to 96 months in federal prison. Ageloff's brother, Michael Ageloff, pleaded guilty to money laundering and received a 48-month sentence in 2009.

== Notable inmates ==
=== Current and former ===
Inmate Name	Register Numbers	Photo	Status	Details
Anderson Lee Aldrich	95144–510		Now at USP Big Sandy; serving 55 concurrent life sentences without parole plus 190 years.	Perpetrator of the 2022 Colorado Springs nightclub shooting.
Ruben Zuno-Arce	43203-080		Died in custody in 2012 while serving a life sentence.	Drug cartel figures convicted in connection with the 1985 kidnapping and murder of US Drug Enforcement Administration Agent Enrique Camarena.
Larry Lawton	52224-004		Transferred to FCI Jesup and others. Released from custody in 2007.	Ex-jewel thief and Gambino crime family associate Lawton now helps and inspires younger people to stay out of prison and change their life path.
Linda Schrenko	56443-019		Released from custody in August 2013; served 6 years.	Georgia Superintendent of Schools from 1994 to 2004; pleaded guilty in 2006 to fraud and money laundering for embezzling over $600,000 in federal education funds.
Matthew Bevan Cox	40171-018		Released in 2019.	Former mortgage broker and US Secret Service Most Wanted fugitive; pleaded guilty in 2007 to masterminding a mortgage fraud scheme, stealing $15 million from 100 victims in eight states; the story was featured on the CNBC television program American Greed.
James Nichols	24268-112		Released from custody in December 2022.	Convicted in 2003 of orchestrating the Miracle cars scam, one of the largest advance fee frauds in US history, during which 4,000 people bought cars that did not exist, losing over $21 million; the story was featured on the CNBC television show American Greed.
Clayton Roueche	36994-177		Now at FCI Edgefield. Scheduled for release in 2027.	Leader of the United Nations gang, a violent Canadian-based criminal organization; pleaded guilty to drug trafficking and money laundering in 2009.
Ethan Nordean	28596–509		Sentenced to 18 years. Released after sentence was commuted by President Donald J. Trump on January 20, 2025.	Participant in the January 6 United States Capitol attack.
Fredy Renán Nájera	76172–054		Serving a 30-year sentence; scheduled for release in 2043.	Former politician from Honduras who was convicted of importing 30 tons of cocaine into the United States.
Ghassan Elashi	29687-177		Now at USP McCreary. Scheduled for release in 2068.	Former Chairman of the Holy Land Foundation; convicted in 2008 of providing material support for terrorism charges for funneling money to the terrorist organization Hamas. Four co-conspirators were also convicted.
Justin Volpe	49477-053		Now in custody of RRM New York. Released in 2024.	Former New York City Police officer; convicted in 1999 of torturing prisoner Abner Louima in the bathroom of the 70th Precinct stationhouse in Brooklyn, New York in 1997 in one of the most high-profile cases of police brutality in US history.
Terry Flenory	32454-044		Now in custody of RRM Detroit. Scheduled for release in 2025.	Co-founder of the Black Mafia Family criminal organization; pleaded guilty in 2007 to leading a national drug trafficking operation based in Detroit, Michigan with his brother, Demetrius Flenory, who was also sentenced to 30 years.
Corrine Brown	67315-018		Was serving a 60-month sentence, her original release date was scheduled for May 2022 but she was released on health reasons relating to COVID-19 on April 22, 2020	Former United States Representative; convicted in 2017 of using a sham charity as a personal slush fund.
Michael Conahan	15009-067		Sentenced to 17.5 years in 2008, released to home confinement in 2020 due to COVID-19.	Former Luzerne County Judge convicted in the Kids for Cash scandal.
Greg Junnier	59088-019		Released in February 2013; served 4 years.	Convicted on a conspiracy charge for his role in the Killing of Kathryn Johnston.
Cesar Altieri Sayoc Jr.	17781-104		Serving a 20-year sentence; scheduled for release on November 10, 2035. Transferred from Federal Correctional Complex, Butner.	Perpetrator of the October 2018 United States mail bombing attempts in which he tried to send packages with explosives to leading Democratic Party politicians.

== See also ==
- List of U.S. federal prisons
- Federal Bureau of Prisons
- Incarceration in the United States
