= Lunsford =

Lunsford may refer to:

== People ==
- Thomas Lunsford (ca. 1611–1656), Royalist colonel in the English Civil War
- Bascom Lamar Lunsford (1882–1973), American lawyer, folklorist and musician
- Christopher Lunsford (born 1992), American singer–songwriter
- Earl Lunsford (1933–2008), Canadian football player
- Andrea Lunsford, American writer and scholar
- Darrell Lunsford (1943–1991), murdered American police officer
- Bruce Lunsford (1947–2026), American politician
- Mel Lunsford (born 1950), American football player
- Dale A. Lunsford, sixth president of LeTourneau University
- Bret Lunsford (born 1962), American musician
- Matt Lunsford (born 1976), American founder and co-owner of Polyvinyl Record Co.
- Trey Lunsford (born 1979), American baseball player
- Jennifer Lunsford (born 1982), American politician
- Stephen Lunsford (born 1989), American actor
- Derek Lunsford (born 1993), American bodybuilder

== Homicides ==
- Murder of Jessica Lunsford
- Murder of Darrell Lunsford

== Places ==
- Lunsford, an area of Larkfield, Kent, England, also known as Lunsford Park

== See also ==
- Frank Lunsford Williams (1864–1953) American educator
