= Federal Correctional Institution, Jesup =

Medium-security prison in Georgia, US

Coordinates: 31°33′48″N 81°54′10″W

- Interactive map of Federal Correctional Institution, Jesup
- Location: Jesup, Georgia
- Status: Operational
- Security class: Medium, low and minimum-security
- Capacity: 1,180 (540 in low-security facility; 160 in prison camp)
- Managed by: Federal Bureau of Prisons

The Federal Correctional Institution, Jesup (FCI Jesup) is a medium-security United States federal prison housing male inmates in Jesup, Georgia. It is operated by the Federal Bureau of Prisons, a United States Department of Justice division. It has two adjacent satellite facilities: a low-security facility and a minimum-security prison camp, housing male offenders.

FCI Jesup is 65 miles (105 km) southwest of Savannah, Georgia and 105 miles (169 km) northwest of Jacksonville, Florida.

== Facility ==
As of 2000, the minimum-security camp of FCI Jesup housed about 300 prisoners. Ben Reyes, who served time in the camp for bribery and conspiracy, said that the camp was "a more relaxed, more bucolic facility" than the Federal Correctional Complex, Beaumont.

As of 2011, FCI Jesup houses adult male prisoners in all its properties. It includes a medium-security facility for 1,150 prisoners. It also has two satellite camps, including a low-security property for 605 prisoners and a minimum-security property for 150 prisoners.

== Notable inmates (current and former) ==
Name	Register number	Photo	Status	Details
Charles Stango	11435-082		Was serving a 10-year sentence; released from custody on March 24, 2023.	Charles Stango is the head of the DeCavalcante crime family.
Christopher Chaney	22396-018		Released from custody on May 19, 2021.	Computer hacker; pleaded guilty in 2012 to gaining unauthorized access to protected computers for breaking into the personal online accounts of celebrities including Scarlett Johansson and Christina Aguilera and posting revealing photos of them on the Internet.
Larry Lawton	52224-004		Released in 2007. Transferred to FCI Edgefield and others.	Ex-jewel thief and Gambino crime family associate.
Fabio Ochoa Vásquez	09017-016		Released December 3, 2024.	Former drug lord and leading member of the Medellín cocaine trafficking cartel, along with his older brothers Juan David and Jorge Luis. His role briefly made him a billionaire. After serving a brief prison term in Colombia, He was arrested again in 1999, and accused of contributing knowledge and receiving payments for cocaine shipments. He was extradited to the United States in September 2001, and convicted in 2003 of trafficking, conspiracy and distribution of cocaine in the U.S.
Muhammad Dakhlalla	16907-042		Serving an 8-year sentence; released from custody on June 1, 2022.	Nicknamed "Mo" - Sentenced in 2016 for offenses related to his attempt to join ISIS in Syria with his fiancée, Jaelyn Young
Timothy L. Tyler	99672-012		Sentence commuted by President Obama; released from custody on August 30, 2018.	Sentenced in 1992 to life in prison for possession and distribution of LSD. Tyler had been arrested twice previously and was on a three-year probation; he had previously not served any jail time.
Ben T. Reyes	76205-079		Released on December 29, 2006.	A former Texas politician (member of the Texas House of Representatives and Houston City Council), he was convicted of bribery and conspiracy. He was transferred to Jesup from a facility near Beaumont.
Bobby Paul Edwards	32836-171		Serving a 10-year sentence; scheduled for release on November 6, 2026.	Restaurant owner who forced mentally disabled employee to work at his restaurant. The case was high-profile over allegations that the crime was racially motivated (Edwards is white and the victim was black).
Russell Wasendorf	12191-029		Serving a 50-year sentence; scheduled for release in 2054.	Peregrine Financial Group founder; pleaded guilty in 2012 to mail fraud, embezzlement and making false statements for stealing over $100 million from the clients over a 20-year period and falsifying documents to cover up the fraud.
Andrew Fahie	07491-506		Serving a 135-month sentence; scheduled for release on April 10, 2033.	Former Premier of the British Virgin Islands; arrested in Miami in 2022 on charges related to money laundering and attempted drug trafficking for the Sinaloa Cartel; convicted at trial in 2024.

== See also ==
- List of U.S. federal prisons
- Federal Bureau of Prisons
- Incarceration in the United States
