= Timothy L. Tyler =

American drug dealer

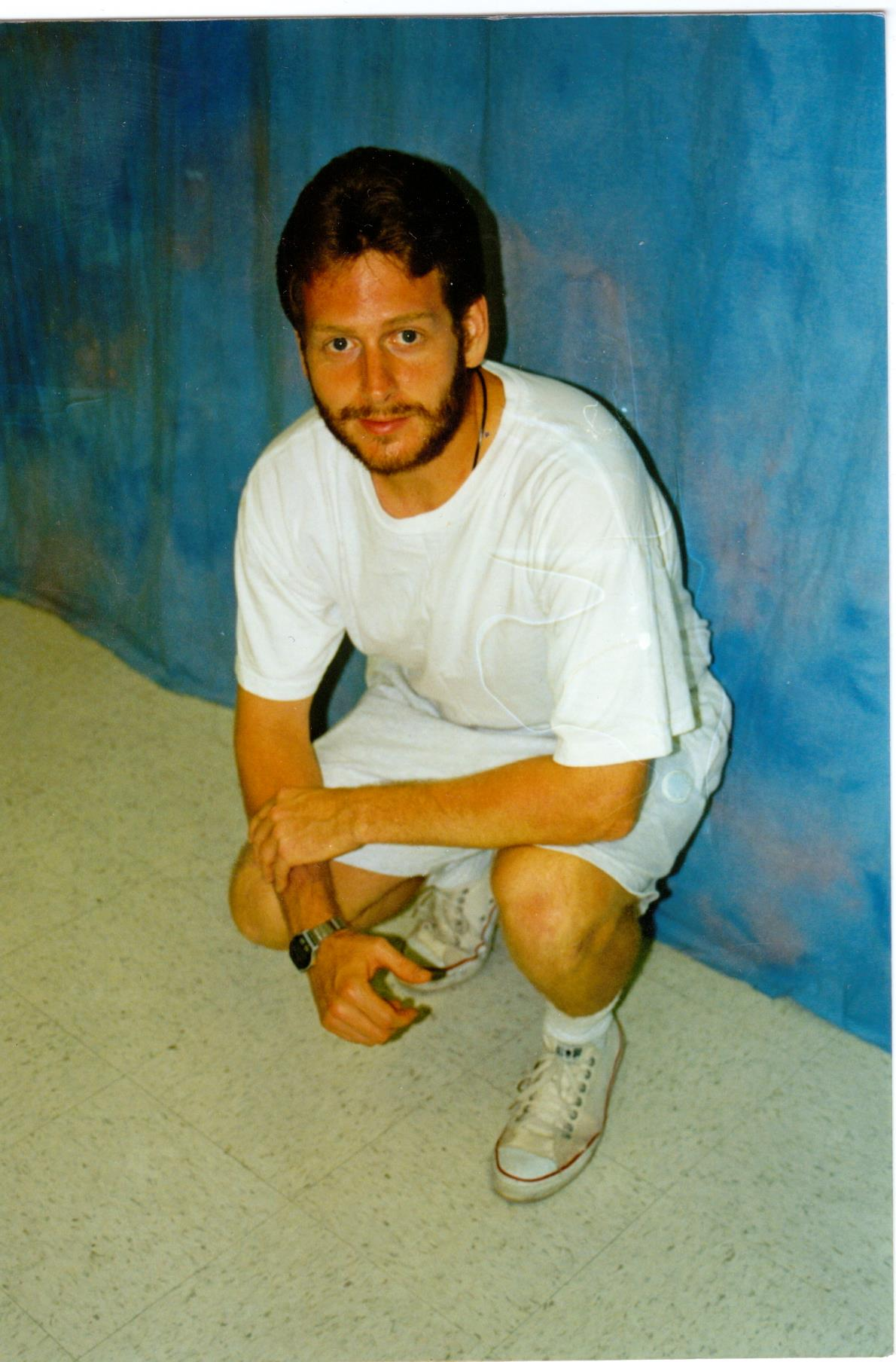
Timothy Leonard Tyler in 2013.

Timothy Leonard Tyler (born 1968) is an American who was sentenced to life in prison for possession and distribution of LSD (or "acid") under the federal three-strikes law. In August 2016, after serving 24 years and 27 days behind bars, Tyler was granted clemency by President Barack Obama. He was released on August 30, 2018.

== Background ==
Tyler was raised in Connecticut and Florida, where he attended Lakewood Senior High School, graduating in 1986. His parents were divorced and he was physically and emotionally abused by his stepfather. He suffered from depression as a child and had episodes that resulted in at least six emergency mental health hospitalizations.

After graduation, he toured the country attending Grateful Dead concerts, where he sold fried dough, fruit smoothies, beer, and soda. He also consumed and sold marijuana and LSD. He was first arrested in Panama City, Florida for LSD possession and released on his own recognizance. A second arrest occurred that resulted in three years of probation. Tyler resumed touring with the Grateful Dead and sent LSD to a friend who was arrested for marijuana possession who turned into a confidential informant for the Drug Enforcement Administration (DEA). During a two-month period, this informant, working with the DEA, asked Tyler to mail him LSD five times, which Tyler did. Tyler sent the package to his father's address, implicating him in the crime.

== Sentencing ==
According to a pre-sentencing memorandum, Tyler was charged with selling 1,300 hits of acid, found on 13 sheets of paper and equivalent to several grams of liquid. According to the memo prepared by his probation officer, he netted about $3,000 from "a very loosely woven conspiracy" that involved selling acid to "friends, family and business acquaintances". Tyler pleaded guilty to drug distribution.

In 1992, at age 24, he was sentenced to life in prison without parole because of his two prior drug convictions (for which he did not serve prison time) under the federal three-strikes law. Under the law's stipulations, the judge was not able to consider Tyler's drug addiction, lack of violent conduct, mental health issues, or youth when determining his sentence.

Because the packages of LSD were sent to Tyler's father, he was convicted of conspiracy. He received a 10-year sentence and died in prison. His friend who worked as a confidential informant served 10 years.

== Life in prison ==
After his conviction, Tyler was incarcerated in United States Penitentiary, Canaan in Pennsylvania. As of 2016, he was held in Federal Correctional Institution, Jesup, a medium-security federal prison. Because of prison prohibitions against music, Tyler went 20 years from the time of his initial arrest without listening to any Grateful Dead music, except what his sister could play for him in the limited phone time he was allocated. In 2012, inmates were permitted to purchase digital music players.

In 2013, Senator Rand Paul highlighted Tyler's case, writing that he "should have been punished for selling drugs, but he shouldn’t have to spend the rest of his life in prison for it. Today, Timothy is 45 and will likely spend the rest of his life behind bars, not because a judge thought it was a proper punishment, but because an arbitrary federal law demanded it."

More than 400,000 people signed a petition on Change.org calling on President Barack Obama to grant Tyler clemency. In August 2016, he was granted clemency, and subsequently released on August 30, 2018.
