= United States v. Shi =

American piracy case

- Court: United States Court of Appeals for the Ninth Circuit
- Full case name: United States of America v. Lei Shi
- Argued: November 6, 2007
- Decided: April 24, 2008
- Citation: 525 F.3d 709

Case history
- Prior history: 396 F. Supp. 2d 1132 (D. Haw. 2003)

Court membership
- Judges sitting: Diarmuid O'Scannlain, A. Wallace Tashima, Milan D. Smith, Jr.

Case opinions
- Majority: O'Scannlain, joined by a unanimous court

Laws applied
- 18 U.S.C. § 2280

United States v. Shi, 525 F.3d 709 (9th Cir. 2008), is a case involving piracy on the high seas. The case held that United States could try foreign nationals on foreign-flagged vessels for crimes committed on the high seas, outside the territory of the United States.

== Incident and capture of the Full Means II ==
The incident occurred on March 14, 2002, aboard the Full Means II (富明二號), a Taiwanese fishing vessel registered in the Republic of the Seychelles and owned by Taipei-based FCF Fishery Company (豐群水產股份有限公司), while in international waters off the coast of Hawaii. Shi Lei (施雷) (Note: In this Chinese name, the family name is Shi.), a 21-year-old Chinese sailor serving as the cook of the vessel, was demoted to deckhand by the Taiwanese Captain Chen Chung-She (陳忠社; Chén Zhōngshè). Shi had demanded to go home to China but was refused and allegedly beaten. In retaliation, he stabbed and killed Captain Chen on the bridge. Afterwards, Shi also fatally injured Chinese first mate Li Da Feng (李大丰), who told the rest of the crew what happened before dying twelve hours later. Shi alleged that both Chen and Li had previously harassed and repeatedly beaten him. Fellow crew stated that while Shi was regularly beaten, he also had a history of unsanitary cooking and often slacked off altogether.

After killing the men, Shi ordered the second mate to "drive the ship," and ordered the other crewmembers to throw the captain's body overboard. He allegedly stated that he would kill anyone who disobeyed him and refused to let his crewmates use the radio. He controlled the ship for two days, setting a course for China and threatening to scuttle the vessel if his instructions were not obeyed.

On March 16, 2002, the crew overpowered Shi, and imprisoned him in a storage compartment. The crew then set a course for Hawaii, but did not contact FCF, apparently because none of them knew how to operate the radio. FCF notified the U.S. Coast Guard that its ship was missing, as the company had not heard from the ship for several days, and asked the Coast Guard to help find it.

Five days after Shi had seized the ship, Coast Guard cutter Kiska intercepted the ship approximately 60 miles from Hilo, Hawaii. Although rough waters prevented direct contact between the ships, two crewmen jumped overboard to deliver a letter summarizing the situation. Over the next two days, Shi, who was still imprisoned by the crew in the storage compartment, spoke to a Coast Guard officer and admitted to having killed the two men. FBI agents then boarded the ship and arrested Shi. He was arrested for violating 18 U.S.C. §2280, which prohibits acts of violence that endanger maritime navigation.

Shi Lei
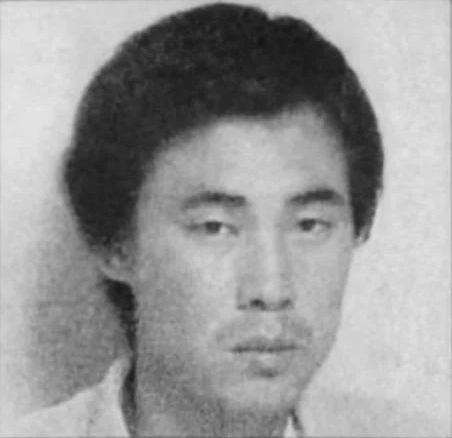
- Shi on March 29, 2002
- Born: March 1981 (age 45); China
- Status: Incarcerated
- Motive: Revenge
- Convictions: Seizing control over a ship by force resulting in death Performing an act of violence likely to endanger the safety of the ship resulting in death (2 counts)
- Penalty: 36 years imprisonment

Details
- Victims: Chen Chung-She; Li Da Feng
- Date: March 14, 2002
- Location: Off the coast of Hawaii
- Weapon: Knife
- Imprisoned at: FCI Yazoo City Low

== Trial and decision ==
The Seychelles waived its jurisdiction. Instead, the United States federal government prosecuted Shi. Full Means Second Mate Xiong Yan Long initially argued through a lawyer that Shi should not be tried in a U.S. court since the murders and hijacking took place in international waters, but First Assistant U.S. Attorney Elliot Enoki stated that they had justification as the ship had intentionally set course for the United States after Shi was subdued and because first contact was with the U.S. Coast Guard.

Shi was charged with one count of seizing control over a ship by force resulting in death, and two counts of performing an act of violence likely to endanger the safety of the ship resulting in death. After a jury trial before U.S. District Judge Helen W. Gillmor of the District of Hawaii, Shi was convicted and sentenced to 36 years in prison.

The U.S. Attorney General did not authorize a death sentence in this case, although one had been requested by the prosecuting attorney.

Shi appealed, challenging, among other things, the district court's jurisdiction. In 2008 the United States Court of Appeals for the Ninth Circuit, in an opinion by Judge Diarmuid F. O'Scannlain, rejected Shi's claims that he cannot be tried in the U.S. because piracy is subject to universal jurisdiction, and because Sec. 2280 implements the Convention for the Suppression of Unlawful Acts Against the Safety of Maritime Navigation — to which the United States is a party – which expressly provides notice that prohibited conduct may be prosecuted by any state signatory.

As of 2025, Shi, listed as "Lei Shi" in the Federal Bureau of Prisons (BOP) register under number 88784-022, is incarcerated at FCI Yazoo City Low in Mississippi. He is scheduled for release on July 6, 2033.
