= Larry Lawton =

American YouTuber and former jewel thief (born 1961)

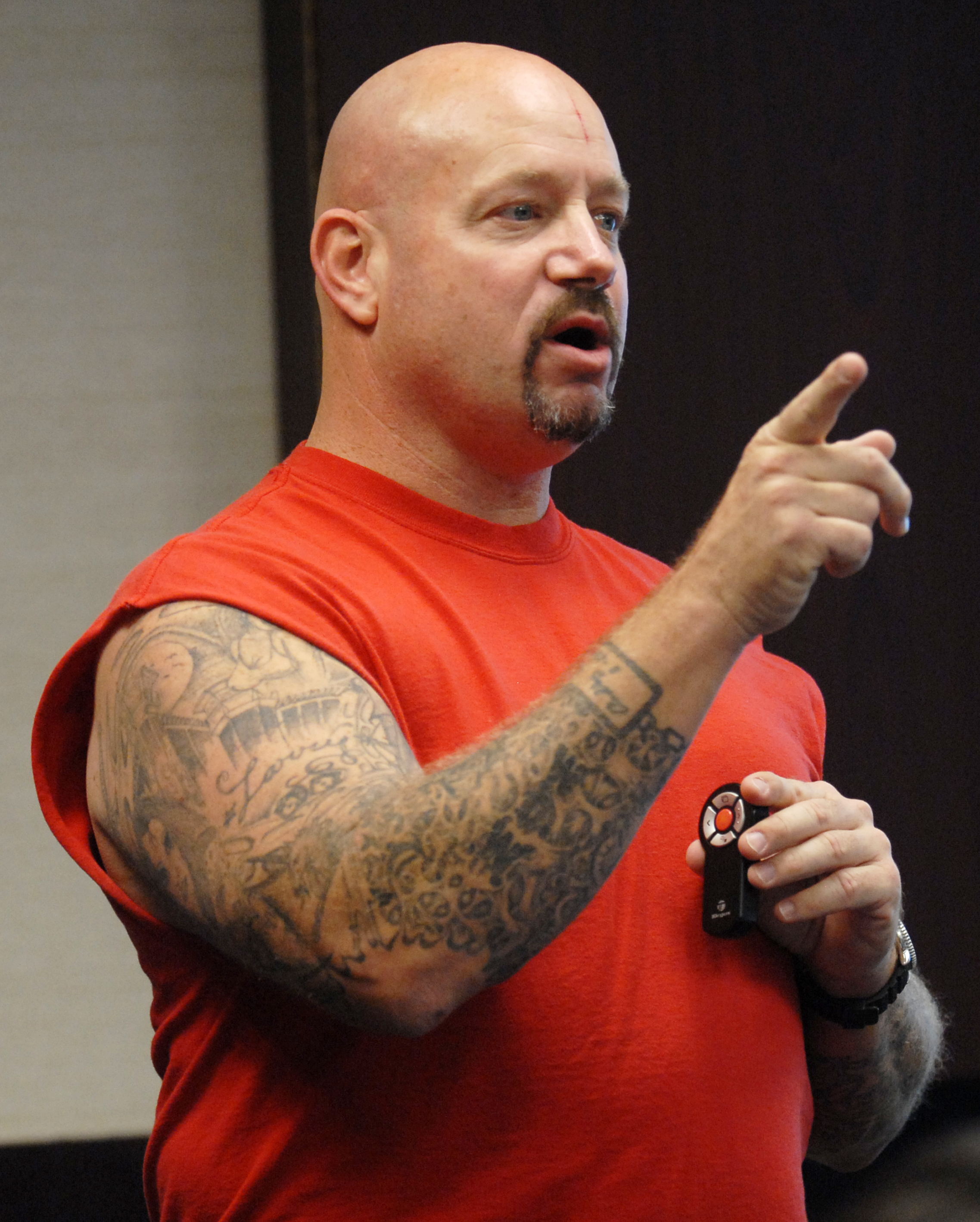
- Lawton in 2010
- Born: Lawrence Robert Lawton; October 3, 1961 (age 65); North Hempstead, New York, U.S.
- Criminal information
- Status: Released from the federal prison system on August 24, 2007
- Conviction: Interfering with the interstate commerce under Hobbs Act through robbery
- Penalty: Four concurrent 11-year federal imprisonment sentences

Details
- Imprisoned at: FCI Schuylkill, USP Lewisburg, FTC Oklahoma City, USP Atlanta, FCI Coleman, FCI Jesup, FCI Edgefield, FCI Yazoo, FCI Forrest City, FCI Tallahassee, and Riker's Island

YouTube information
- Channel: Larry Lawton
- Years active: 2019–present
- Genre: Entertainment
- Subscribers: 1.48 million
- Views: 215 million
- Last updated: July 15, 2026
- Website: realitycheckprogram.com

Lawrence Robert Lawton (born October 3, 1961) is an American ex-convict, author, paralegal, motivational speaker, and YouTuber. Lawton gained notoriety for committing a string of jewelry store robberies along the Atlantic Seaboard prior to his arrest in 1996. He spent 12 years in prison, and once released, began a career as a motivational speaker, life coach, and author.

In 2007, he started the Reality Check Program to help educate at-risk youths on the consequences of breaking the law. He has acted as a spokesman for prisoners and prisoner issues, been a vocal advocate for prison reform, and made appearances in the media as an expert on robberies.

== Early life ==
Lawton was born in North Hempstead, New York on October 3, 1961. His first encounter with organized crime was through his father, a metal worker who delivered bribes to the New York mafia. In grades one through six, Lawton served as an altar boy at St. Francis de Chantal in The Bronx, where he was sexually abused by a Catholic priest. Lawton attended Intermediate IS 192 and Lehman High School, but did not graduate. In August 1979, he joined the Coast Guard and took part in the Mariel boatlift. In 1983, having earned his GED, he left the Coast Guard and began engaging in criminal activity, mostly loan sharking and bookmaking.

== Criminal career ==
Lawton executed his first robbery when he was 28, an inside job to collect insurance money. He then began robbing jewelry stores along the Atlantic Coast, using his contacts within the Gambino crime family to fence the stolen merchandise. At one point, he purchased an Italian pizza restaurant in North Lauderdale, Florida, which he later burned down as part of an insurance fraud.

== Capture ==
In May 1994, three males robbed a jewelry store in Daytona Beach, Florida, netting $500,000 (over $1,000,000 in 2024) worth of gold and diamonds. The robbers had dropped off jewelry for repairs, and later returned to rob the store. Then in October 1994, four individuals robbed a jewelry store in Palm Bay, Florida. The two store owners were bound while two individuals robbed the store and a third acted as a lookout and the other as the getaway driver. The robbers took $480,000 ($910,600.81 in 2022) worth of gold and diamonds making it the biggest robbery in the city's history. Local police believed there was a connection between this robbery and a robbery that took place in May 1994 in Daytona Beach, and contacted the FBI.

In 1996, there was a robbery of a jeweler in Fairless Hills, Pennsylvania. The robbers had been there the day before and returned asking about a ring. The robbers drew what police at the time believed were firearms, and restrained the store owner. The store owner managed to break free and grabbed a .38 caliber pistol and fired five shots at the robbers as they fled. One bullet narrowly missed Lawton, but struck his brother. Lawton later said that he used a BB gun during the robbery. Afterwards, another jewelry store in Lower Bucks County became suspicious of a person they believed was casing the place for a future robbery. They reported the car's license plate, which linked the car to Lawton. Lawton was arrested by the FBI on December 2, 1996, in Florida and charged with the Fairless Hills armed robbery. Fingerprint evidence connected Lawton to the October 1994 Palm Bay heist, and he was charged with that crime as well.

Lawton is believed to have hit around 20 to 25 jewelry stores, stealing a self-estimated total of around $15–18 million worth of high-value items, including watches, diamonds, and other gems. Lawton later claimed that he was the biggest jewel thief of the 1980s and 90s operating within the United States of America.

== Imprisonment ==
Lawton was offered a three-year sentence in exchange for disclosing his accomplices but did not take the deal. He was sentenced for racketeering and robbery and spent 11 years in prison before being released in 2007. He received an additional sentence in 2002 for giving false witness. While in prison, Lawton earned a paralegal qualification and became a gang mediator. He was incarcerated in many prisons during his sentence, which included Jesup in Georgia, Riker's Island in New York, Edgefield in South Carolina, and Yazoo City in Mississippi. While recounting his prison experiences he said: "I saw inmates stabbed and friends die" and "I saw young men raped and pimped out as prostitutes for other inmates." Another time he said: "I had my arms pinned down, and I was beaten and peed on — by the guards. I was kicked. My ribs were broken. I was beaten once a month."

While in prison in 2003, Lawton was sent to solitary confinement for 27 days as punishment. Lawton filed a lawsuit against the prison and staff alleging that they violated his rights. The suit was later dismissed. Lawton says he regrets his time spent in prison, because he missed out on seeing his children grow up; his grandmother died, and his father became afflicted with Alzheimer's disease while he was inside.

== Post-release ==
=== Reality Check program ===
After release he went to Palm Bay, Florida and started LL Research and Consulting and met a business partner. He also founded the Reality Check program which aims to show teens the consequences of a criminal life. The program is four hours long. Lawton does not hold a degree in child psychology or criminology. High school students can use the time spent in the program towards the 75 hours of community service required for the Bright Futures Scholarship Program.

Law enforcement officials and judges have supported the program. In 2009, the Brevard County Sheriff's Office spent $4500 on 500 DVDs from the Reality Check program. The DVDs contained condensed versions of Lawton's program and were 67 minutes long. In 2009 the Rockledge Florida police used the DVDs as part of a community policing project with the money to buy the DVDs procured through asset forfeiture. By 2010, Lawton had shipped 10,000 DVDs across the country. In 2013, Lawton was made an honorary police officer by the Lake St. Louis, Missouri Police Department due to his work after prison. He was the first ex-con to ever become an honorary police officer. The Lake St. Louis police chief praised Larry's message about the consequences of going to prison and said it is not a scared straight program, noting that Lawton said "fear doesn't have a lasting impact." Lawton and the police chief later appeared before United States Congress in recognition of the program.

The superintendent of student services at Brevard Public Schools declined to use the program and questioned its effectiveness: "[w]hile the program is well-organized and well-intentioned, it does not follow the scientific evidence-based research guidelines".

Lawton also founded the Reality Check Foundation, which is a 501(C)(3) charity that includes a mentoring program, and an annual golf outing. It also hosts an annual bowling tournament.

=== Other ===
Lawton is an advocate for prisoners and their rights, and comments on the justice system. In 2013, the Brevard County Jail re-introduced chain gangs as a pilot project with the goal of deterring crime. Lawton was critical of the move, saying that "[c]hain gangs send a bad message about [the US]." Instead he proposed a better use of law enforcement resources would be to "help inmates with drug addiction." He was critical of Brevard County stopping letters to inmates in 2013. He said that some of the recipients could be innocent. Other issues he is concerned with include prison conditions as well as post-release debt loads and their influence on unemployed ex-convicts. Lawton has also shown concern over the prevalence of fentanyl-laced heroin, noting that in the past dealers had tried to sell pure heroin without any additives.

In 2017, he appeared in a middle school in Havelock, North Carolina to explain his prison experiences. His appearance was part of the Drug Abuse Resistance Education program.

Lawton has made many media appearances. He has appeared on The Daily Show with Jon Stewart, Christian Broadcasting Network, and Fox News. Often he appears discussing crimes in the media as an expert on robberies. In 2010, Lawton filmed the pilot and sizzle reel for Lawton's Law, a reality show based on his work with at-risk youth. He also hosted a local talk radio show. In 2012, Lawton self-published Gangster Redemption, an autobiography co-written with Peter Golenbock. The 367-page book covers his early life, his string of crimes, and his post-release career.

In 2019, he made a video with Vanity Fair where he analyzed fictional robberies from films such as The Italian Job and Heat. Lawton has a YouTube channel, and he has made videos analyzing heists in movies and video games such as Grand Theft Auto V; he also plays Prison Architect.

== Personal life ==
=== Religion ===
Lawton identifies both as "spiritual" and agnostic. He has linked his childhood sexual abuse by a Catholic priest to his "negativity" regarding religion, although he has also stated he does not hate religion.

According to Lawton, while he was incarcerated in his early forties, he had an experience where he explicitly heard the words "I have plans for you" while alone in his cell after one of his prison friends hanged himself.

=== Politics ===
Lawton describes himself as a libertarian, fiscal conservative and "big-time" social liberal.

=== Hobbies ===
Lawton has described himself as an "avid reader" and "avid writer". He reports having read the Bible five times "as a novel", as well as the Quran and Torah three times each, and "many books on Buddhism".

== Works ==
- Lawton, Larry; Golenbock, Peter (2012). Gangster Redemption: How America's Most Notorious Jewel Robber Got Rich, Got Caught, and Got His Life Back on Track. New York: LL Research & Consulting. ISBN 978-0985408206.
