= Federal Correctional Complex, Beaumont =

Federal prison in Texas, United States

United States Penitentiary, Beaumont
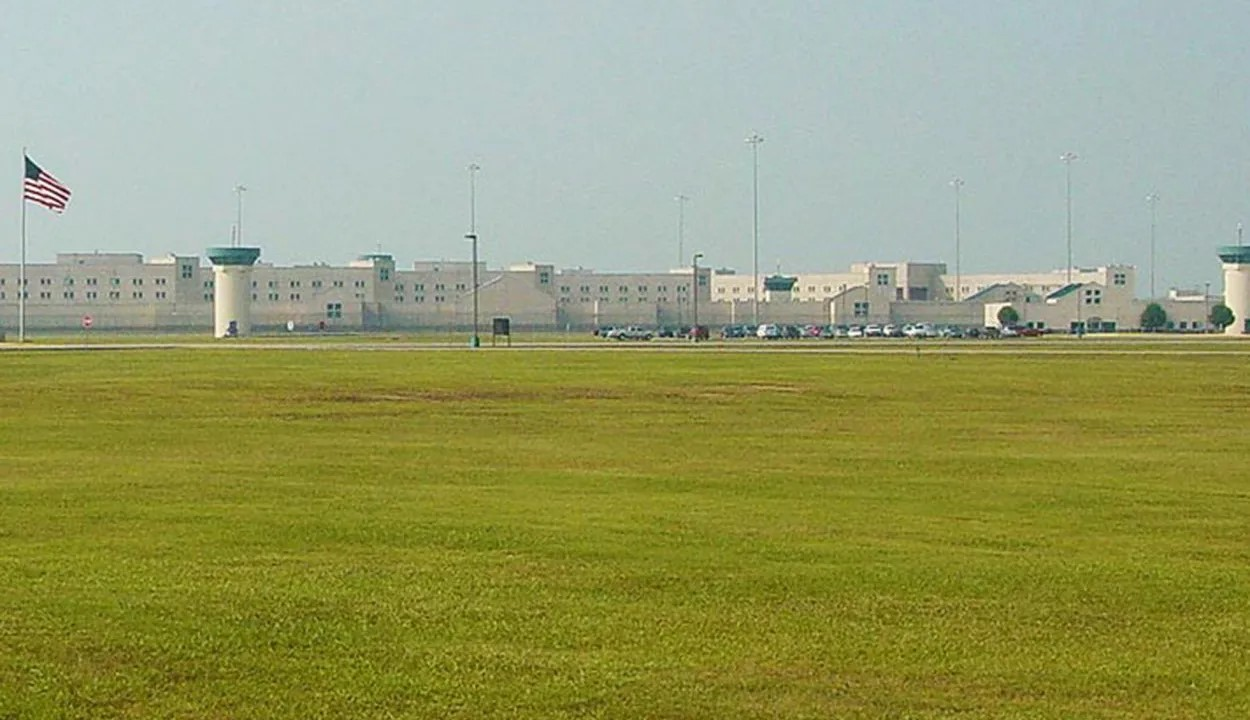
- Interactive map of United States Penitentiary, Beaumont
- Location: Jefferson County, Texas; 29.9646°N 94.0791°W
- Status: Operational
- Security class: High, medium and low-security
- Population: 5,000 (three facilities)
- Opened: 1998
- Managed by: Federal Bureau of Prisons

The Federal Correctional Complex, Beaumont (FCC Beaumont) is a United States federal prison complex for male inmates in unincorporated Jefferson County, Texas. It is operated by the Federal Bureau of Prisons, a division of the United States Department of Justice.

The complex consists of three facilities:

- Federal Correctional Institution, Beaumont Low (FCI Beaumont Low): a low-security facility.
- Federal Correctional Institution, Beaumont Medium (FCI Beaumont Medium): a medium-security facility.
- United States Penitentiary, Beaumont (USP Beaumont): a high-security facility.

FCC Beaumont is located approximately 4 miles (6 kilometers) south of the City of Beaumont; 35 mi (56 km) from the Gulf of Mexico; 100 mi (160 km) east of Houston; and 268 mi (431 km) west of New Orleans, Louisiana.

== See also ==
- Federal Bureau of Prisons
- Incarceration in the United States
- List of U.S. federal prisons
