= Federal Correctional Institution, Edgefield =

Medium-security prison in South Carolina, US

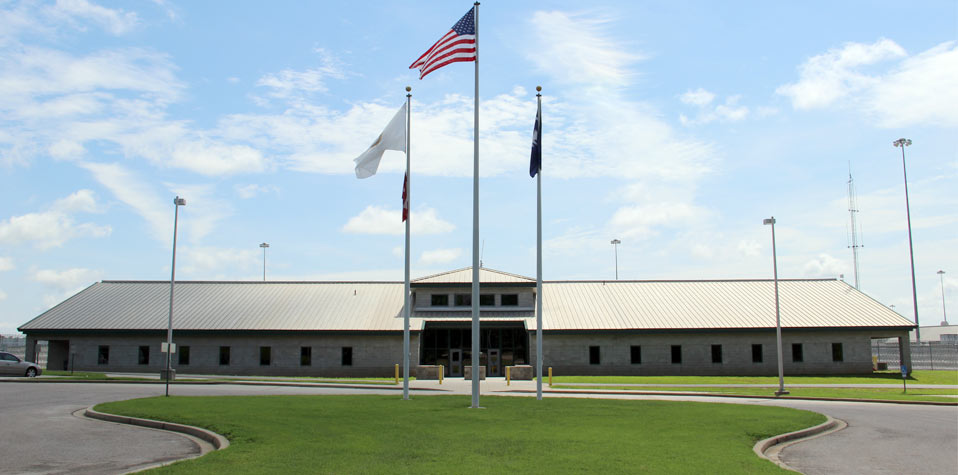
- Interactive map of Federal Correctional Institution, Edgefield
- Location: Edgefield County, near Edgefield, South Carolina; 33°45′31″N 81°55′10″W
- Status: Operational
- Security class: Medium-security (with minimum-security prison camp)
- Population: 1,700 (560 in prison camp)
- Opened: 1998
- Managed by: Federal Bureau of Prisons

The Federal Correctional Institution, Edgefield (FCI Edgefield) is a medium-security United States federal prison for male inmates in South Carolina. It is operated by the Federal Bureau of Prisons, a division of the United States Department of Justice. The facility also has an adjacent satellite prison camp for minimum-security male offenders, which houses between 500 and 549 inmates.

The satellite prison camp also has the Residential Drug and Alcohol Program, which is part of the prison reform and rehabilitation program for those who are addicted to alcohol and other drugs.

It is in Edgefield County, and partially in the municipal limits of Edgefield.

FCI Edgefield is located near the South Carolina-Georgia border, approximately 25 miles (40 km) north of Augusta, Georgia.

== Notable incidents ==
In 2002, an unidentified correction officer working at FCI Edgefield pleaded guilty to Georgia state charges for possession with the intent to distribute marijuana. This resulted in a sentence of three years' incarceration, followed by seven years of supervised release. A joint investigation by the Department of Justice Inspector General's Office and the Richmond County Sheriff's Office revealed that the officer took over $9,000 in bribes in exchange for receiving packages containing marijuana and passing them on to inmates.

On May 20, 2010, the US Attorney's Office in Columbia, South Carolina, announced that two former correctional officers at FCI Edgefield, Gregory Conyers and Antonio Heath, had been indicted for accepting bribes from inmate Boyce Tisdale in exchange for smuggling contraband into the facility. Conyers and Heath subsequently pleaded guilty and were sentenced to prison. Tisdale was transferred to the Federal Correctional Complex, Butner, North Carolina, and is scheduled for release in 2023.

== Notable inmates (current and former) ==
Inmate Name	Register Number	Photo	Status	Details
Christopher Coke	02257-748		Serving a 23-year sentence; scheduled for release in 2029. Currently at FCI Fort Dix.	Drug kingpin; leader of the Shower Posse, a violent drug gang in Jamaica; extradited to the US after a 72-hour manhunt during which 74 people were killed; Coke pleaded guilty in 2011 to trafficking large quantities of cocaine into the US.
Larry Lawton	52224-004		Moved here from FCI Jesup. Transferred to FCI Yazoo and others. Released on August 24, 2007.	Ex-jewel thief and organized crime member. Lawton now helps and inspires younger people to stay out of prison and change their life path.
Miguel Rodriguez Orejuela	14022-059		Serving a 30-year sentence; scheduled for release in 2028. Currently at FCI Loretto.	Co-founder of the now-defunct Cali Cartel, which was responsible for as much as 80% of the cocaine brought into the US in the 1970s and 1980s; co-founder Gilberto Rodriguez Orejuela is also serving a 30-year sentence.
Quazi Nafis	81710-053		Serving a 30-year sentence; scheduled for release in 2038.	Bangladeshi citizen; pleaded guilty in 2013 to attempted use of a weapon of mass destruction for attempting to detonate what he thought was an 800-pound bomb outside the Federal Reserve Bank in New York City.
Thomas Noe	26157-018		Transferred to an Ohio state prison in 2008; serving an 18-year sentence in connection with the Ohio Coingate Scandal.	Republican party fundraiser; pleaded guilty in 2006 to money laundering for illegally funneling money to President George W. Bush's 2004 campaign. Parole Board again says Noe should stay behind bars.
Abduwali Muse	70636-054		Serving a 33-year sentence; scheduled for release in 2038. Transferred back to FCI Terre Haute	Somali pirate leader; pleaded guilty to hijacking in 2010 for leading a group who seized the Merchant Vessel Maersk Alabama and took the captain hostage in 2009; US Navy SEALs killed the three other pirates involved in the hijacking and rescued the captain.
Sami Osmakac	55958-018		Scheduled for release in 2046	Planned terrorist attacks in 2012 in Tampa, Florida.
Kevin Ricks	77607-083		Scheduled for release in 2032.	Former teacher who was arrested and convicted on Statutory rape and child pornography charges.
Clayton Roueche	36994-177		Scheduled for release in 2027.	Leader of the United Nations gang, a violent Canadian-based criminal organization; pleaded guilty to drug trafficking and money laundering in 2009.
Aaron Zahn			Self-reported on January 27, 2025. Serving a four year sentence.	Former CEO of JEA, convicted of conspiracy to embezzle federal property and wire fraud in an attempt to extract hundreds of millions of dollars through a utility privatization effort designed to benefit himself and aligned leadership.

== See also ==
- List of U.S. federal prisons
- Federal Bureau of Prisons
- Incarceration in the United States
