= Jaelyn Young =

American woman who tried to join ISIS

Jaelyn Delshaun Young is an American woman, who with fellow Mississippi State University student and her fiancé, an American man named Muhammad Oda "Mo" Dakhlalla, attempted to join ISIS in 2015. The two were students at Mississippi State University in Starkville, Mississippi when they met, and later decided to travel to Syria to join the known terrorist organization, ISIS. Young was apprehended by the FBI and ultimately pleaded guilty to terrorism-related charges. U.S. District Judge Sharion Aycock sentenced Young to 12 years in federal prison on August 11, 2016.

== Early life and education ==
Young is from Vicksburg, Mississippi, where she attended Warren Central High School. The daughter of a police officer and a former Navy Reserve member, Young was a cheerleader and honors student. She graduated with honors in 2013 from Warren Central High School, and was studying chemistry at Mississippi State University in Starkville, Mississippi at the time of her arrest.

The son of an imam, her fiancé, Muhammad Oda “Mo” Dakhlalla was raised in the Islamic faith in Starkville, Mississippi. His father is Oda H. Dakhlalla, a Palestinian American man from Bethlehem; and his mother was Lisa Dakhlalla, an American woman from New Jersey who had prior converted to Islam. He also has two older brothers. His parents established the Islamic Center of Mississippi where his father served as imam, located in his hometown of Starkville, Mississippi (the same location of Mississippi State University, where Young and Dakhlalla first met). Dakhlalla's mother died due to Hodgkin's lymphoma in 2016.

== ISIS support and arrest ==
Young and Dakhlalla began dating in November 2014. In March 2015, as stated in documents submitted in federal court, Young announced that she had converted to Islam and began wearing Islamic dress, which included a hijab headscarf and a niqab face veil (often described in the media as a "burqa"). Young and Dakhlalla partook in a nikah (an Islamic marriage ceremony) on June 6, 2015. They never engaged in a civil marriage. Young did not previously have a record of frequent attendance at a mosque nor at the Muslim Students Association at Mississippi State.

Beginning in May 2015, Young and Dakhlalla made statements on social media supportive of ISIS. An undercover FBI agent posed as a member of the group and Young told her that while their families did not support ISIS, she and Dakhlalla did and could lend support. Prosecutors said Young was the leader of the plot; she hoped to serve as a member of medical personnel while Dakhlalla wished to engage in combat. The two had no previous legal infractions.

Both were arrested on August 8 at Golden Triangle Regional Airport near Columbus, Mississippi; they had an itinerary on Delta Air Lines to fly to Istanbul, Turkey via Atlanta and Amsterdam. They were supposed to meet their would-be recruiter at the Sultan Ahmed Mosque (Blue Mosque) in Istanbul.

The two were, as pre-trial inmates, housed in a jail in Oxford, Mississippi. Judge S. Allan Alexander chose not to grant them bail due to a belief that the two may have still wished to cause a terrorist act.

On March 13, 2016, Dakhlalla pleaded guilty to the offense of "conspiring to provide material support" to a terrorist organization; in August 2016 U.S. District Judge Sharion Aycock gave him an eight-year prison sentence and 15 years of supervised release. He fully cooperated with investigators and gave them a series of letters that Young sent to Dakhlalla while they were imprisoned; she did not realize that he was going to cooperate with the federal government. As of 2017 Dakhlalla is in Federal Correctional Institution Jesup near Jesup, Georgia.

On March 30, 2016, Young pleaded guilty to the same offense that Dakhlalla pleaded guilty to, doing so in Aberdeen, Mississippi federal court. She was sentenced by Aycock to 12 years in federal prison on August 11, 2016. After the prison sentence, Young would have 15 years of probation. Aycock ordered that, during the probation period, law enforcement may search Young's electronic devices to check whether she is engaging in terrorist-related activity on the internet.
