= Federal Correctional Institution, Beaumont =

Prison in Texas, United States

Coordinates: 29°57′35″N 94°4′14″W

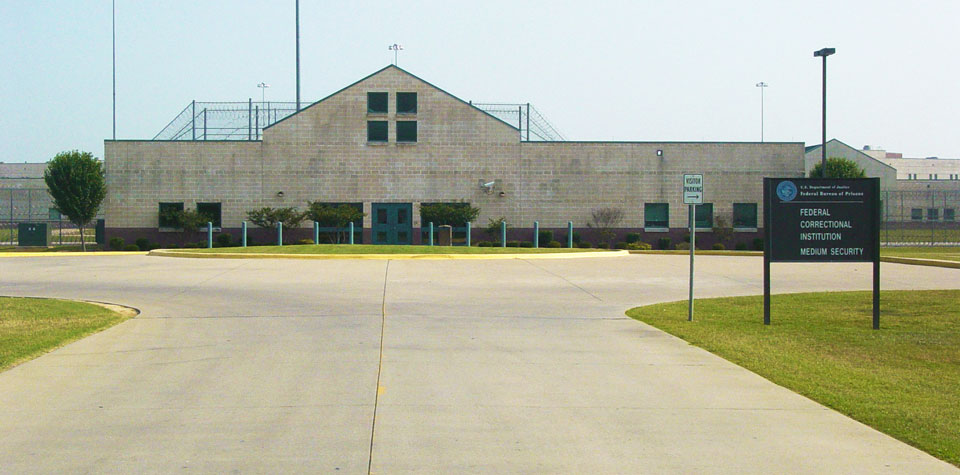
- Interactive map of Federal Correctional Institution, Beaumont
- Location: Jefferson County, near Beaumont, Texas
- Status: Operational
- Security class: Low-security and Medium-security
- Opened: 1998
- Managed by: Federal Bureau of Prisons

The Federal Correctional Institution, Beaumont (FCI Beaumont) is a United States federal prison for male inmates in unincorporated Jefferson County, Texas. It is part of the Beaumont Federal Correctional Complex (FCC Beaumont) and is operated by the Federal Bureau of Prisons, a division of the United States Department of Justice. It consists of two facilities:

- Federal Correctional Institution, Beaumont Low: a low-security facility
- Federal Correctional Institution, Beaumont Medium: a medium-security facility

FCC Beaumont is located approximately 35 miles from the Gulf of Mexico; 100 miles east of Houston; and 190 miles west of Baton Rouge, Louisiana.

== Facility and programs ==
FCI Beaumont Medium has 12 general population housing units. Educational opportunities include GED and ESL programs, as well as adult continuing education and correspondence classes. Inmates work at an on-site UNICOR textile factory.

== Notable inmates ==
Inmate Name	Register Number	Photo	Status	Details
Abdulrahman Odeh	26548-050		Was serving a 15-year sentence; released in 2021.	Fundraiser for the Holy Land Foundation, once the largest Islamic charity in the US; convicted in 2008 of providing material support for terrorism for funneling money to the terrorist organization Hamas. Four co-conspirators were also sentenced to prison.
Aurelio Cano Flores	99506-555		Serving a 35-year sentence; scheduled for release in 2039.	Former Mexican police officer and high-ranking member of the Gulf Cartel; convicted in 2013 of conspiring to import multi-ton quantities of cocaine and marijuana into the US; also ordered to forfeit $15 billion in drug proceeds.
Baldemar Sambrano Villarreal	03367-078		Serving a life sentence	Convicted murderer; responsible for the murder of police constable Darrell Lunsford on January 23, 1991. Villarreal and two others were transporting marijuana from Texas to Illinois when they were pulled over by Lunsford. When Lunsford requested to search the trunk of the vehicle, Villarreal and his accomplices tackled Lunsford to the ground. Villarreal then took Lunsford's own service weapon and murdered him with the handgun. He was sentenced to spend the remainder of his life in jail for the murder and is to never be released from prison.
Luke Brugnara	12047-111		Was serving a seven-year sentence; released in 2020.	San Francisco and Las Vegas real estate developer. Convicted in 2015 of fraud for receiving artworks but refusing to pay for them, along with escaping custody and contempt of court.
Rick Crawford	70138-018		Serving a ten-year sentence; scheduled for release in 2027.	Former professional racing driver, 5-time winner in the NASCAR Camping World Truck Series, convicted in 2018 of enticing a minor after attempting to arrange a sexual liaison with a 12-year-old girl via Craigslist with an undercover sheriff's deputy.
Steve Stockman	23502-479		Was serving a ten-year sentence. His sentence was commuted by President Donald Trump and he was released on December 22, 2020.	Former Republican congressman for Texas's 36th congressional district from 2013 to 2015 and former Republican congressman for Texas's 9th congressional district from 1995 to 1997. Convicted of 23 white-collar crimes in 2017, including money laundering, mail and wire fraud, conspiracy to make conduit contributions and false statements, making false statements to the Federal Election Commission, making excessive contributions, and falsification of records.
Justin Volpe	49477-053		Serving a 30-year sentence, scheduled for release in 2024. Currently at RRM New York.	Volpe was charged with several counts in federal court of violating Abner Louima's civil rights, obstruction of justice, and making false statements to police
Abdul Malik Abdul Kareem	44126-408		Serving a 30-year sentence. Currently at FCI Hazleton, scheduled for release in 2041.	Conspirator in the Curtis Culwell Center attack. Knowingly provided the shooters with firearms and ammunition.
Dennis Alexio	93052-011		Serving sentence of 15 years. Scheduled for release in 2027.	Dennis "The Terminator" Alexio, World kickboxing champion, professional boxer and actor. Convicted in 2016 of tax fraud, money laundering and 26 other charges.

== See also ==
- List of U.S. federal prisons
- Federal Bureau of Prisons
- Incarceration in the United States
