= Federal Prison Camp, Nellis =

Federal prison in Nevada, United States

Coordinates: 36.2351°N 115.0342°W

Nellis Prison Camp was a United States federal minimum-security prison, also known as a Federal Prison Camp (FPC), located on Nellis Air Force Base in the state of Nevada. The camp was operational between 1989 and 2006. Notable former inmates include Peter Bacanovic who was convicted along with Martha Stewart of various crimes in the ImClone scandal.

== History ==
The prison opened in 1989 to provide a labor force for the air force base.

== Inmate labor ==
Inmates participated in a work program on Area II of Nellis AFB. The inmates typically performed janitorial services, groundskeeping, and cleaning of the base bowling alley.

== See also ==
- List of U.S. federal prisons
- Prisons in the United States
