= December 2018 Time Warner Center bomb threats =

2018 incident

On the evening of December 6, 2018 at approximately 10:15 pm Eastern Standard Time, the Time Warner Center in New York City was evacuated due to a bomb threat by a phone call from an unknown source. The building houses CNN offices and studios for most of its American shows, and the live broadcast of CNN Tonight was interrupted when a fire alarm went off and employees had to exit the building. Host Don Lemon tweeted the happenings as the broadcast suddenly ended and a previously taped Anderson Cooper 360 program aired in its place. Shortly after, Lemon, along with media analyst Brian Stelter and crime and justice reporter Shimon Prokupecz continued a live broadcast from the outside of the building, providing updates to the bomb threats. Police did not find any suspicious devices and the suspect was not identified.

== Similar 2018 incidents involving CNN ==
This was the third time CNN was threatened via telephone in 2018; other incidents occurred in January and November. Both suspects in those cases have been apprehended and charged with several crimes. It was also the second time in 2018 that the Time Warner Center was evacuated during a live broadcast; the first being in October when the building received a package containing a suspected pipe bomb that did not explode, one of several sent across the country that week, including another destined for the Time Warner Center and one meant for the CNN Center in Atlanta, both of which were intercepted by authorities before reaching their intended destinations. A suspect in that case was arrested soon after and later pleaded guilty to dozens of federal crimes.

== See also ==
- CNN controversies
- 2018 Bitcoin bomb threats
- George Floyd protests in Atlanta#May 29, which involved the CNN Center being attacked by protestors in May 2020
