= USCGC Kiska =

Island-class patrol boat of the US Coast Guard

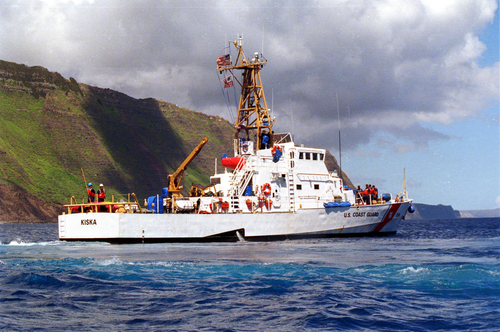

History

United States
- Name: USCGC Kiska
- Namesake: Kiska Island, Alaska
- Commissioned: 1990
- Home port: Santa Rita, Guam
- Identification: MMSI number: 367914000; Callsign: NUSF
- Status: Active in service

General characteristics
- Class & type: Island-class cutter
- Displacement: 164 tons
- Length: 110 ft (34 m)
- Beam: 21 ft (6.4 m)
- Draft: 6.5 ft (2.0 m)
- Propulsion: Twin Paxman Valenta 16-CM RP-200M
- Speed: over 30 knots (56 km/h; 35 mph)
- Range: 9,900 miles
- Endurance: 6 days
- Boats & landing craft carried: 1 × RHIB
- Complement: 18 personnel (2 officers, 16 enlisted)
- Armament: 25 mm Mk 38 machine gun; 2 × .50-caliber machine gun

USCGC Kiska (WPB-1336) is an Island-class cutter of the United States Coast Guard, named for the island of Kiska, Alaska.

== Design ==
The Island-class patrol boats were constructed in Bollinger Shipyards, Lockport, Louisiana. Kiska has an overall length of 110 feet (34 m). It had a beam of 21 feet (6.4 m) and a draft of 7 feet (2.1 m) at the time of construction. The patrol boat has a displacement of 154 tonnes (152 long tons; 170 short tons) at full load and 137 tonnes (135 long tons; 151 short tons) at half load. It is powered two Paxman Valenta 16 CM diesel engines or two Caterpillar 3516 diesel engines. It has two 99 kilowatts (135 PS; 133 shp) 3304T diesel generators made by Caterpillar; these can serve as motor–generators. Its hull is constructed from highly strong steel, and the superstructure & major deck are constructed from aluminium.

The Island-class patrol boats have maximum sustained speeds of 29.5 knots (54.6 km/h; 33.9 mph). It is fitted with one 25 millimetres (0.98 in) autocannon & two 7.62 millimetres (0.300 in) M60 light machine guns; it may also be fitted with two Browning .50 Caliber Machine Guns. It is fitted with satellite navigation systems, collision avoidance systems, surface radar, and a Loran C system. It has a range of 3,330 miles (2,890 nmi; 5,360 km) and an endurance of five days. Its complement is sixteen (two officers & fourteen crew members). Island-class patrol boats are based on Vosper Thornycroft 33 metres (108 ft) patrol boats and have similar dimensions.

== History ==
On March 19, 2002, the Kiska intercepted the Taiwanese fishing vessel Full Means II (富明二號), which had been taken over by its cook, who had murdered the captain and first mate.
