= Federal Correctional Complex, Yazoo City =

Low-security federal prison in Mississippi, US

Coordinates: 32.888184°N 90.431919°W

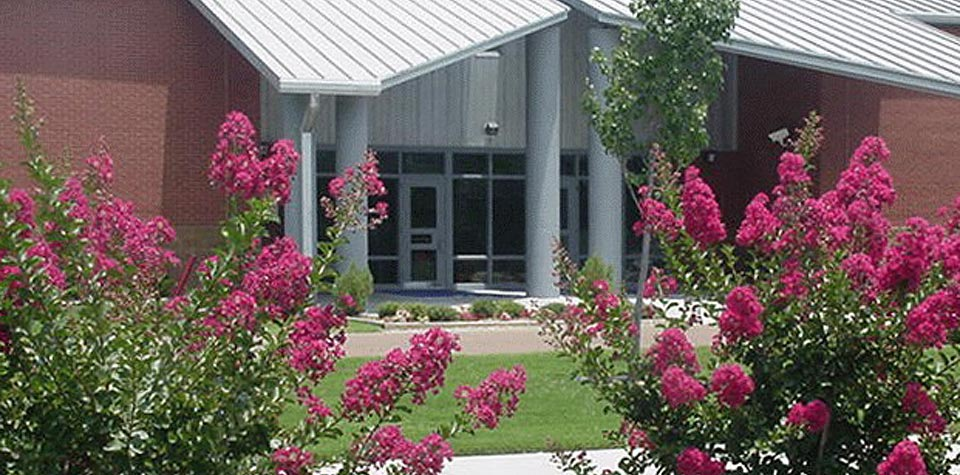
- Interactive map of Federal Correctional Complex, Yazoo City
- Location: Yazoo County, near Yazoo City, Mississippi
- Status: Operational
- Security class: High, medium, and minimum-security
- Population: 4-474 [all three facilities] (September 2023)
- Opened: 2005
- Managed by: Federal Bureau of Prisons
- Warden: Shannon D. Withers

Federal Correctional Institution, Yazoo City Medium
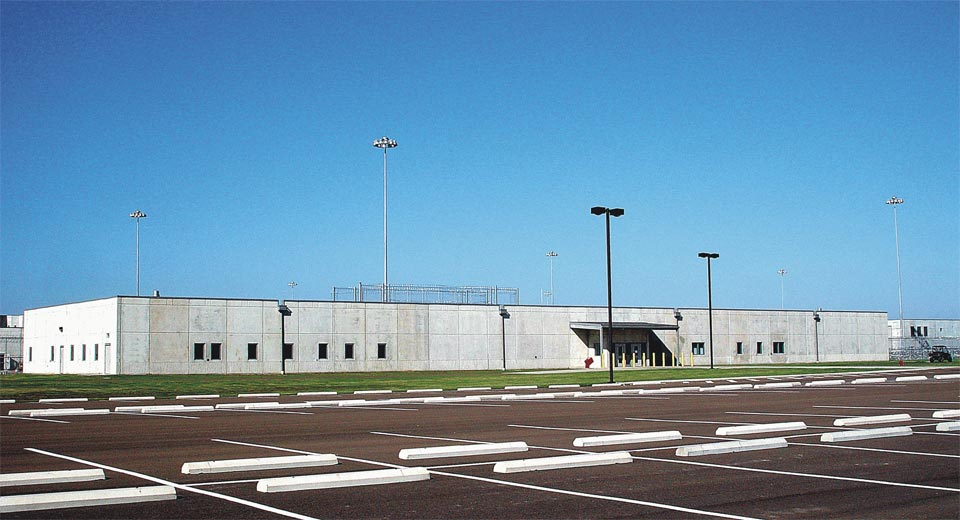
- Interactive map of Federal Correctional Institution, Yazoo City Medium
- Location: Yazoo County, Mississippi
- Status: Operational
- Security class: Medium security
- Managed by: Federal Bureau of Prisons
- Warden: Marcus Martin

The Federal Correctional Complex, Yazoo City (FCC Yazoo City) is a United States federal prison complex for male offenders in unincorporated Yazoo County, Mississippi. It is operated by the Federal Bureau of Prisons, a division of the United States Department of Justice and is located 36 miles (58 km) north of Jackson, Mississippi. It consists of:

- Federal Correctional Institution, Yazoo City Low (FCI Yazoo City Low): a low-security facility with an adjacent satellite prison camp houses for minimum-security offenders.
- Federal Correctional Institution, Yazoo City Medium (FCI Yazoo City Medium): a medium-security facility, with an adjacent satellite prison camp for minimum-security offenders.
- United States Penitentiary, Yazoo City (USP Yazoo City): a high-security facility.

FCC Yazoo City is located 36 miles north of Jackson, Mississippi, the state capital.

== Notable incidents ==
In 2008, a joint investigation conducted by the Bureau of Prisons Office of Inspector General and the Department of Justice revealed that Raymond Morton, a correctional officer at FCI Yazoo City, had accepted bribes from an inmate whom the Bureau of Prisons did not identify. Morton was indicted on April 8, 2008, for agreeing to receive and accept bribes from a federal inmate. He subsequently pleaded guilty to the charge in federal court and was sentenced to probation.

On February 26, 2013, Robert Kale Johnson, a former correctional officer at FCI Yazoo City, was sentenced to 15 months in prison followed by 3 years of supervised release for taking a $5,000 bribe in exchange for bringing contraband into the facility. Johnson was released in June 2014.

On March 25, 2010, Dashun Temple, a correction officer at the FCC Yazoo City, Mississippi, pleaded guilty to Workman's Compensation Fraud in federal court. Claiming that he had suffered a back injury from lifting boxes, Temple admitted submitting fraudulent medical travel refund requests to the Department of Labor from December 2007 through August 2008. Temple claimed that he had traveled from his home in Pearl, Mississippi to a medical clinic in Woodville, Mississippi on 84 different occasions. An investigation revealed through the records of the clinic that Temple had only made 5 legitimate trips, thus leaving 79 trips as fraudulent. Temple received a total of $11,595.76 in reimbursements. Temple was terminated, ordered to pay restitution, and sentenced to probation.

== Notable inmates ==
=== Current ===
Inmate Name	Register Number	Photo	Status	Details
Manssor Arbabsiar	65807-054		Serving a 25-year sentence; scheduled for release in 2033	Convicted for his role in the 2011 alleged Iran assassination plot which was a plan to murder the Saudi Ambassador to the United States, Adel al-Jubeir.
Dino Delano Bouterse	BOP 92082-054		Serving a 16-year sentence, scheduled for release in 2027.	The son of the former President of Suriname, Dési Bouterse, pled guilty to conspiring to import five kilograms and more of cocaine into the United States and attempting to provide material support to Hezbollah.
Darnell Catlett	BOP 16529-016		Serving a 16 year sentence, scheduled for release on November 28, 2030.	Sentenced for his role as a leader of a nearly year-long crack and cocaine drug trafficking conspiracy in Washington, D.C. and Maryland. This included one count of conspiracy to distribute and possess with intent to distribute 280 grams or more of cocaine base and a detectable amount of cocaine.
Michael Finton	17031-026		Serving a 28-year sentence; scheduled for release in 2034.	Convicted of planning to bomb a courthouse in Springfield, Illinois.
Philip Giordano	BOP 14302-014		Serving a 37-year sentence. Scheduled for release on July 29, 2032.	The former mayor of Waterbury, Connecticut from 1996-2001. In 2003, Giordano was convicted in federal court of using an interstate device, his cellphone, to repeatedly arrange sexual contact with a 10-year old niece and the 8-year old daughter of a prostitute with whom he was having an affair while serving as mayor.
Luther Hackman	BOP 09425-510		Scheduled for release on July 20, 2037.	Hackman pleaded guilty to money laundering and conspiring to distribute cocaine.
Mohammed Modin Hasan	BOP 75673-083		Serving a life sentence.	Somali pirate leader; convicted in November 2010 connection with an April 2010 attack on the American warship Nicholas, during which Hasan fired a rocket propelled grenade at what he believed was a merchant ship he and his co-defendants aimed to commandeer.
Shi Lei	88784-022		Serving a 36-year sentence; scheduled for release on July 6, 2033	Former cook; convicted in 2005 of using violence to seize and exercise control of a vessel in international waters for murdering Captain Chen Chung-She and First Mate Le Da Feng during an unsuccessful hijacking attempt in 2002.
Scott Tucker	BOP 06133-045		Serving a 16-years, 8-months sentence, scheduled for release in June 8, 2031.	Operated a multi-billion dollar payday loans company, especially in states where these high-interest, low-principal loans were restricted or illegal. Convicted on 14 counts of racketeering, wire fraud, money laundering, and Truth In Lending Act offenses.

=== Former ===
Inmate Name	Register Number	Photo	Status	Details
Larry Lawton	52224-004		Transferred to FCI Forrest City and others. Released on August 24, 2007.	Ex-jewel thief and organized crime member. Lawton now helps and inspires younger people to stay out of prison and change their life path.
Karey Lee Woolsey	34411-018		Sentenced to 151 months (12 years, 7 months) in August 2008. Released July 2018.	Convicted of attempting to distribute more than 7,000 pounds of marijuana in Florida and is serving a 13-year sentence. Woolsey released an album while incarcerated that has seen top-10 placement on Billboard charts.
David Darnell Brown	20669-075		Released from custody in November 2013; served 15 months.	American rap artist known as Young Buck; pleaded guilty in 2012 to being a felon in possession of a firearm; guns were found in his home during a 2010 Internal Revenue Service raid on his home.
Mark Ingram Sr.	22749-050		Released from custody in November 2015; served 7 years.	Former National Football League player; pleaded guilty in 2005 to laundering money he believed to be proceeds from narcotics deals and to bank fraud for cashing counterfeit checks.
Michael Lohman	31390-034		Released from custody in June 2015; served 3 years.	Former New Orleans Police Lieutenant; pleaded guilty in 2010 to obstruction of justice for attempting to cover up the 2005 Danziger Bridge shootings, during which officers shot six unarmed civilians, killing two; several other officers were also sentenced to prison.
Marc Emery	40252-086		Released from custody in July 2014; served 4 years.	Canadian cannabis advocate and once the largest supplier of marijuana seeds in the United States; pleaded guilty in 2010 to conspiracy to manufacture marijuana.
Eric Dewayne Boyd	BOP 31710-074		Initially sentenced to 18 years imprisonment for two fatal carjacking related charges, Boyd was later charged and convicted at state level on over 30 charges, and sentenced to life imprisonment.	In 2008 Boyd was convicted of being an accessory after the fact, and concealing a felon in relation to the 2007 Murders of Channon Christian and Christopher Newsom. In 2018 he was indicted by a grand jury and convicted at state level of kidnapping, robbery, rape and first degree murder in relation to the case.
Steven Nigg	BOP 10896-089		Released from custody in February 2024.	Convicted of armed robbery, known famously for assaulting Jared Fogle at Federal Correctional Institution Englewood, Colorado.

== See also ==
- List of U.S. federal prisons
- Federal Bureau of Prisons
- Incarceration in the United States
