= 2018 United States pipe bomb mailings =

Series of domestic terrorist attacks in 2018

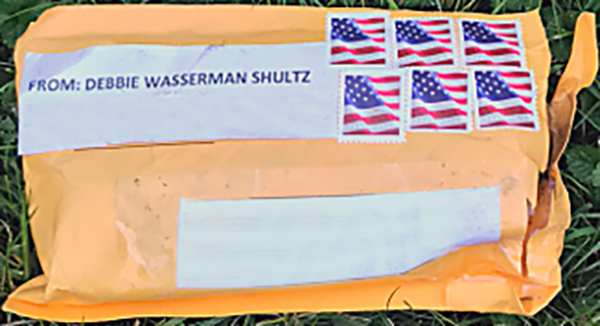
- One of the envelopes that contained explosives
- Location: United States
- Date: October 22, 2018 – November 1, 2018
- Target: CNN and thirteen Democratic Party members and prominent critics of U.S. President Donald Trump
- Attack type: Attempted mail bombings, domestic terrorism
- Weapon: Pipe bombs
- Deaths: 0
- Injuries: 0
- Perpetrator: Cesar Sayoc Jr.
- Motive: Pro-Trump, far-right extremism (see also § Motives)

From October 22 to November 1, 2018, 16 packages found to contain pipe bombs were mailed via the U.S. Postal Service to several Democratic Party politicians and other prominent critics of U.S. President Donald Trump. Targets included former U.S. President Barack Obama, former U.S. Vice President Joe Biden, and former Secretary of State Hillary Clinton.

Other people who were sent packages included three Democratic members of Congress: Representative Maxine Waters, Senators Cory Booker and Kamala Harris; former U.S. Attorney General Eric Holder, two former intelligence chiefs: ex-CIA Director John Brennan and ex-Director of National Intelligence James Clapper; two billionaire Democratic donors and activists: George Soros and Tom Steyer; and actor Robert De Niro. One package was addressed only to CNN and sent to its world headquarters.

The Federal Bureau of Investigation (FBI) and other federal, state, and local law enforcement agencies coordinated their investigations of the attempted bombings. All sixteen confirmed bombs sent were improvised explosive devices, though none had a trigger mechanism. None of the devices exploded outside a controlled setting.

Cesar Altieri Sayoc, Jr. was arrested in Florida on October 26, held without bail, and charged with five federal crimes the following week. The FBI investigated the case as domestic terrorism. On March 21, 2019, Sayoc pleaded guilty to 65 felony counts, including using weapons of mass destruction in an attempted domestic terrorist attack. He was sentenced to a maximum of 20 years in prison on August 5, 2019, and will be eligible for release as early as November 10, 2035.

== Mailings ==
=== Monday, October 22 ===
The first suspicious package containing such a device was found in the mailbox at the home of Democratic donor George Soros in Katonah, New York. Soros, who is regularly the subject of conspiracy theories and threats by right-wing extremists, was absent. The employee who found the device carried it to a wooded area, where bomb squad officers safely detonated it.

=== Tuesday, October 23 ===
A package containing a device, addressed to former U.S. Secretary of State Hillary Clinton (misspelled as "Hilary"), was intercepted by the Secret Service during a mail screening in Chappaqua, New York. A former U.S. Senator from New York and the First Lady of former President Bill Clinton, she was President Donald Trump's main opponent in the 2016 U.S. presidential election.

=== Wednesday, October 24 ===
A device addressed to former President Barack Obama was intercepted by the Secret Service during a mail screening in Washington, D.C.

Additionally, a package containing an explosive and suspicious powder was found in CNN's mail room in the Time Warner Center in New York City, addressed to former CIA Director John Brennan (misspelled as "Brenan"). CNN reported that law enforcement said the package was delivered by courier. Brennan has served as a senior national security and intelligence analyst for NBC News and MSNBC since February 2018, but has also appeared on CNN. The bomb alarm occurred during CNN Newsroom with Poppy Harlow and Jim Sciutto. Along with their colleagues Kate Bolduan and Athena Jones, reporters Harlow and Sciutto left the building, but continued to report via Skype over a cellphone line.

A suspicious package addressed to U.S. Representative Maxine Waters was intercepted by United States Capitol Police. Another suspicious package addressed to Waters resulted in the evacuation of a U.S. Postal Service facility in Los Angeles.

A package addressed to former U.S. Attorney General Eric Holder, with a bad address, was returned to the purported sender, the office of former Democratic National Committee Chairwoman and current U.S. Representative Debbie Wasserman Schultz in Sunrise, Florida.

=== Thursday, October 25 ===
In the early morning hours, a package was found in Tribeca, New York City, addressed to actor, producer and director Robert De Niro, via his company Tribeca Productions. De Niro had previously expressed criticism of Trump.

Authorities also found a package in New Castle, Delaware, addressed to then former Vice President Joe Biden with his full name, Joseph Robinette Biden Jr. It was returned to the post office due to insufficient postage, and examined because of the other packages. A second package intended for Biden, but addressed incorrectly, was found at a facility in Wilmington, Delaware. The Miami-Dade Police Department and federal authorities believed that several of the packages would have passed through a mail processing and distribution center in Opa-locka, Florida; they searched the facility for evidence with a bomb squad and K-9 unit.

=== Friday, October 26 ===
Authorities found four packages similar to previous packages. One addressed to former National Intelligence Director James Clapper (which, like the one sent to John Brennan, had CNN's Time Warner Center address) was found in a New York City postal facility, while another, addressed to U.S. Senator Cory Booker, was found in a Florida postal facility.

Authorities also found a bomb addressed to then-U.S. Senator Kamala Harris in Sacramento, California. A device addressed to billionaire Tom Steyer, a Democratic donor who frequently appeared in ads encouraging Congress to impeach President Trump on CNN, was intercepted by a postal worker at a sorting facility in Burlingame, California.

=== Monday, October 29 ===
CNN President Jeff Zucker issued an alert to employees that a suspicious package sent to the CNN Center was found at a post office in Atlanta, Georgia. Jim Sciutto posted a picture of the package on Twitter and it was similar to the others. Unlike the other two sent to CNN, it was not addressed to a specific person. President Trump has frequently criticized CNN and its employees in derogatory terms.

=== Thursday, November 1 ===
A second package addressed to Steyer was intercepted at the same postal facility in Burlingame, California.

=== Summary ===
Summary of incidents
| Date | Intended target | Title/description (most recently/at the time) | Location discovered |
|---|---|---|---|
| October 22 | George Soros | Founder of the Open Society Foundations | Katonah, New York (Soros residence) |
| October 23 | Hillary Clinton | Former U.S. Secretary of State | Chappaqua, New York (intercepted by Secret Service) |
| October 24 | Barack Obama | Former U.S. President | Washington, D.C. (intercepted by Secret Service) |
| October 24 | Eric Holder | Former U.S. Attorney General | Sunrise, Florida (office of Debbie Wasserman Schultz) |
| October 24 | Maxine Waters | U.S. Representative (D-CA) | Washington, D.C. (Capitol Hill post office) |
| October 24 | Maxine Waters | U.S. Representative (D-CA) | Los Angeles (postal facility) |
| October 24 | John Brennan | Former CIA Director | New York City (Time Warner Center) |
| October 25 | Joe Biden | Former U.S. Vice President | New Castle, Delaware (post office) |
| October 25 | Joe Biden | Former U.S. Vice President | Wilmington, Delaware (post office) |
| October 25 | Robert De Niro | Actor | New York City (office of TriBeCa Productions) |
| October 26 | James Clapper | Former Director of National Intelligence | New York City (post office) |
| October 26 | Cory Booker | U.S. Senator (D-NJ) | Opa-locka, Florida (postal facility) |
| October 26 | Kamala Harris | U.S. Senator (D-CA) | Sacramento, California (postal facility) |
| October 26 and November 1 | Tom Steyer | Billionaire investor | Burlingame, California (postal facility) |
| October 29 | CNN Center | CNN's world headquarters | Atlanta, Georgia (post office) |

== Devices and envelopes ==
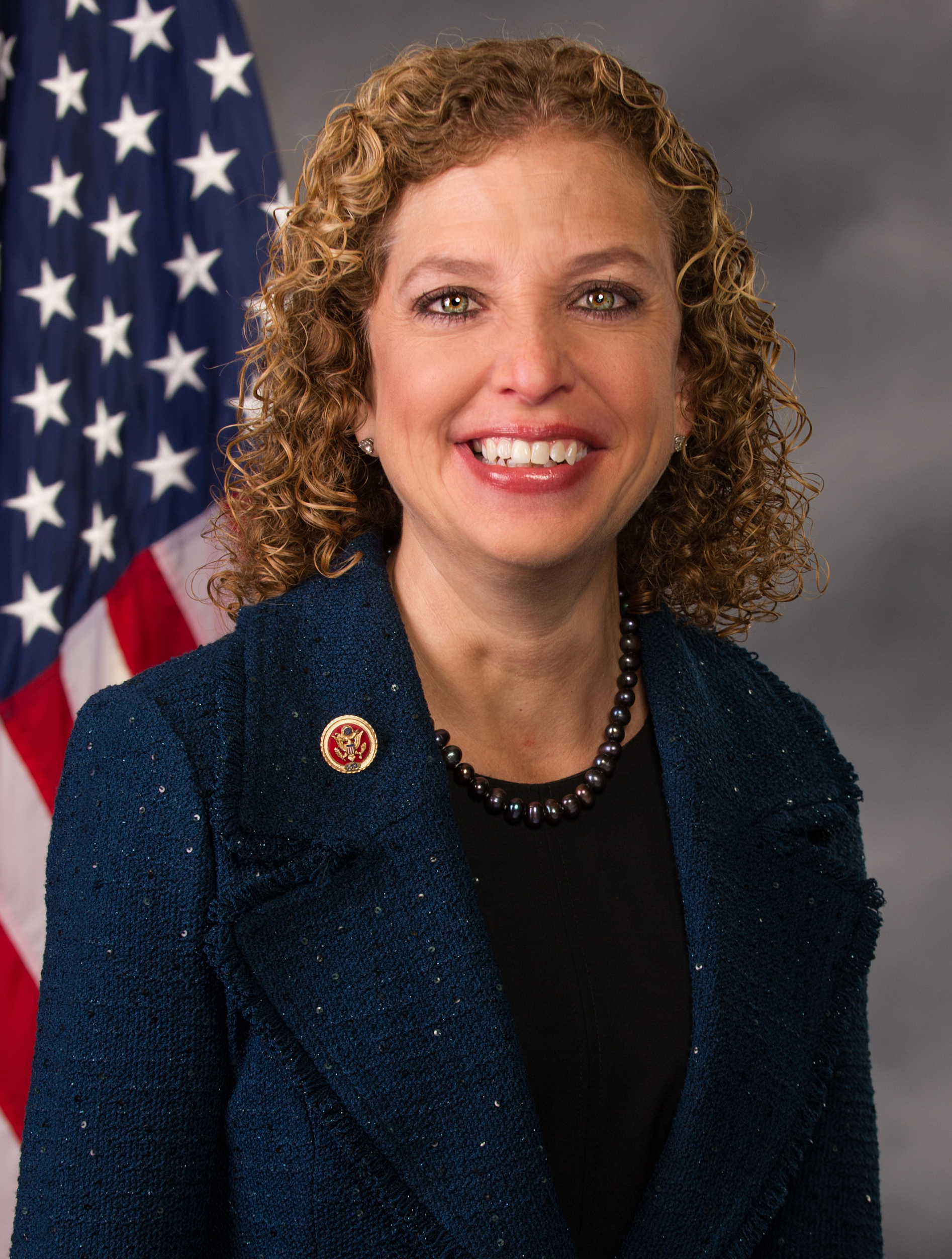
U.S. Representative Debbie Wasserman Schultz's name and Florida office address were on the return label of all of the packages.

According to The New York Times, the device sent to Soros's house was constructed from a length of PVC pipe about six inches (150 mm) long, filled with explosive powder. It was proactively detonated by bomb squad technicians. Authorities reported that the devices recovered on October 24 were packed with shards of glass. A law enforcement official told reporters that the devices sent to Clinton and Obama were similar in design to the one that was sent to Soros. According to the Associated Press, a law enforcement official said tests have determined that white powder found inside an envelope delivered to CNN, along with a pipe bomb, was not viable. The bombs contained pyrotechnic powder but lacked a triggering mechanism; the FBI described them as "potentially destructive devices." Law enforcement officials told the Associated Press that the devices contained batteries and timers but were not rigged to explode when they were opened. The officials said they were still trying to determine if the devices were shoddily constructed or simply intended as threats to sow fear.

At a press conference following the arrest of the suspect, FBI Director Christopher Wray described the bombs as improvised explosive devices, stating that they were "not hoax devices".

All of the devices were sent in yellow manila envelopes lined with bubble wrap. They each had a printed address label and six Forever stamps, as well as the return address of U.S. Representative Debbie Wasserman Schultz's office in Sunrise, Florida. All of the return addresses contained the same spelling errors: Schultz was misspelled "Shultz" and Florida was misspelled "Florids". Each set of labels was typed in all capital letters. The packages were furnished with a meme parody of the ISIL flag with the inscription "Git 'Er [sic] Done", a catchphrase of standup comedian Larry the Cable Guy. Photographs of the packages meant for CNN were posted to Twitter by staffers for Jim Sciutto and Jim Acosta.

== Investigation ==
The FBI led the investigation, with assistance from the United States Secret Service, the Bureau of Alcohol, Tobacco, Firearms and Explosives (ATF); the United States Postal Inspection Service; the New York, Los Angeles, Miami-Dade, and Atlanta police departments; and other law enforcement agencies. Images of envelopes taken by the U.S. Postal Service's Mail Isolation Control and Tracking system have been examined as part of the investigation.

Several of the mail bomb packages were sent to the FBI Laboratory in Quantico, Virginia, for inspection. A fingerprint found on one of the packages and DNA on two other packages pointed to Sayoc as the suspect. He was identified through video surveillance near a South Florida post office, and located by tracking his cell phone. On October 26, Sayoc was arrested in the parking lot of an AutoZone store in Plantation, Florida, in connection with the series of explosive devices sent to several individuals.

== Perpetrator ==
Cesar Sayoc Jr.
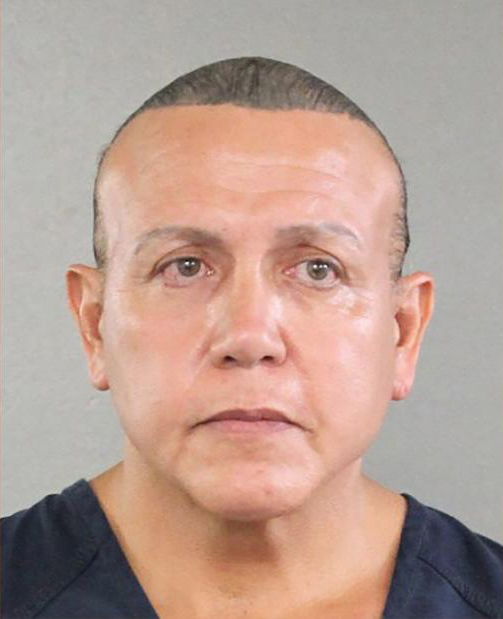
- A mugshot of Cesar Altieri Sayoc Jr. in 2015
- Born: Cesar Altieri Sayoc Jr. March 17, 1962 (age 64); Brooklyn, New York, U.S.
- Education: Brevard College; University of North Carolina at Charlotte
- Status: Incarcerated at FCI Coleman Low, earliest possible release date November 10, 2035
- Criminal charges: 65, including: Interstate transportation of an explosive; Illegal mailing of explosives; Threats against former presidents and certain other persons; Threatening interstate communications; Assaulting federal officers
- Penalty: 20 years' imprisonment

Cesar Altieri Sayoc Jr. (born March 17, 1962) was born in Brooklyn and moved to Florida as a child. His father is a Filipino immigrant and his mother was born in the Bronx and of Italian descent. Sayoc's father abandoned him and his mother when he was a child.

Sayoc graduated from North Miami Beach High School in 1980. He attended Brevard College for three semesters starting that year and transferred to the University of North Carolina at Charlotte in 1983, where he played on the school's soccer team but did not declare a major.

His last known address was that of his mother's house in Aventura, Florida, but Sayoc was living in his van at the time of his arrest.

Sayoc has a long criminal history. In 2002, he pleaded guilty to calling in a bomb threat to Florida Power & Light. He was also arrested on multiple occasions for charges that included theft, battery, and drug possession, with convictions in 1991, 2013, and 2014.

State records list Sayoc as connected to two now-inactive Hallandale Beach, Florida, businesses: Proud Native American One Low Price Drycleaning in 2001 and, more recently at the time of his arrest, Native American Catering & Vending LLC in 2016. Sayoc's home was foreclosed in 2009, and he filed Chapter 7 bankruptcy in 2012 after accumulating debts of more than $21,000.

Sayoc is a bodybuilder and has used anabolic steroids. He has made numerous false claims about himself and his background. He claimed during a 2014 deposition that he played soccer for A.C. Milan and arena football for the Arizona Rattlers, both of which the teams have denied. He claimed to have been a popular stripper, an owner of a strip club, and partner in Chippendales; the company says he never worked there and "has never been affiliated in any way with Chippendales".

At the time of his 2012 bankruptcy, Sayoc said he was employed as a store manager at Hassanco Investments in Hollywood, Florida. From January 2017 to January 2018, he worked part-time making deliveries for a pizzeria in Fort Lauderdale, Florida. At the time of his arrest, he was working as a DJ and doorman at a West Palm Beach strip club.

Sayoc is a registered Republican. He registered with the Republican Party on March 4, 2016. Sayoc filmed himself wearing a MAGA hat at one of the president's rallies. Sayoc was active on Twitter and Facebook starting in 2016; he was known for his extreme views and often posted pro-Trump, reactionist, and anti-liberal messages and memes, as well as right-wing conspiracy theories and stories from InfoWars, WorldNetDaily, and Breitbart News. Sayoc expressed antisemitic views around coworkers, called for the eradication of Jews and a return to "the Hitler days", and trafficked in antisemitic conspiracy theories, including about billionaire philanthropist George Soros (who is Jewish), on his social media accounts.

=== Reports of previous threats ===
Ilya Somin, a libertarian-leaning law professor at George Mason University and a scholar at the Cato Institute, reported that he was the subject of death threats from Sayoc made on Facebook in April 2018. According to Somin, after he appeared on a Fox News interview criticizing those who hold anti-immigration views, Sayoc (using an alias) posted on his Facebook and threatened to kill Somin and his family and "feed the bodies to Florida alligators". At the time, Somin's Facebook friends reported the comments to Facebook, but Facebook did not respond beyond automated messages. Somin also reported the incident to George Mason University police and Arlington, Virginia law enforcement.

Democratic strategist Rochelle Ritchie had also received a threatening tweet from Sayoc on October 11 that said: "Hug your loved ones real close every time you leave you home". While Twitter (now X) initially failed to act on this, Sayoc's accounts were permanently suspended after his arrest and Twitter representatives have since apologized to Ritchie.

=== Van seizure ===
Sayoc's van was seized by law enforcement when he was apprehended. It was covered with images of Donald Trump and Vice President Mike Pence, along with a sticker that read "CNN Sucks". Some posters also supported the "unconquered Seminoles", a Native American tribe that was historically based in Florida; two federally recognized tribes are there, and another in Oklahoma. Sayoc has been described as proudly claiming Native American heritage, but the Seminole Tribe of Florida said there was no record of his being a member or employee of the tribe. Other stickers on the van showed Hillary Clinton, Barack Obama, documentarian Michael Moore, CNN commentator and host Van Jones, and 2016 Green Party U.S. presidential candidate Jill Stein with gunsight crosshair designs on their faces. Moore said on Late Night with Seth Meyers on November 2 that the FBI had visited his home to inform him that Sayoc had conducted extensive research on him, according to his computer records.

Reports indicate that "soldering equipment, stamps, envelopes, paper, a printer and powder" were found in Sayoc's van, suggesting he could have built bombs there. Law enforcement officials told reporters that Sayoc had a "hit list" of more than 100 people in his van; they informed persons on the list but have not released the names publicly. Sayoc reportedly told officials the bombs were harmless and that he did not want to hurt anyone.

=== Charges and legal proceedings ===
Following his arrest, Sayoc was charged with five federal crimes: interstate transportation of an explosive, illegal mailing of explosives, threats against former presidents and certain other persons, threatening interstate communications, and assaulting federal officers. The charges were filed by federal prosecutors of the U.S. Attorney's Office for the Southern District of New York (SDNY). Prosecutors from the SDNY said electronic devices owned by Sayoc had data showing that he began planning the attacks in July 2018.

Sayoc was arraigned in Miami on October 29, 2018, and his court-appointed lawyer entered a not-guilty plea. Three days later, he was ordered to be transferred to New York for trial. On November 6, 2018, a New York judge ordered Sayoc to be held without bail in the Metropolitan Correctional Center, New York.

On March 21, 2019, Sayoc pleaded guilty to 65 felony counts, including using weapons of mass destruction in an attempted domestic terrorist attack. In court, Sayoc stated: "I sent all 16 devices with the intent to threaten or intimidate. I know these actions were wrong." Sayoc said that he did not intend for the bombs to explode, but "was aware of the risk that [they could] explode."

He was sentenced to 20 years in prison on August 5, 2019. During sentencing, Judge Jed S. Rakoff stated that the bombs were purposely designed not to explode or cause anyone damage. Bomb experts agreed that Sayoc's packages were not configured to detonate. In sentencing Sayoc, Rakoff said he had concluded that Sayoc was capable of concocting a pipe bomb that could explode and had consciously chosen not to.

=== Motives ===
In a filing by the defense on July 22, 2019, Sayoc's attorneys said he had "lost everything in the Great Recession", had "cognitive limitations and severe learning disabilities", and was "abandoned by his father and sexually abused by a teacher at his Catholic school." They said that he suffered from "anxiety and paranoia" and that he "came to believe that prominent Democrats were actively working to hurt him". They also said he was an avid Fox News viewer (especially the shows Fox & Friends and Hannity) and on social media, he "promoted various conspiracy theories, and more generally, the idea that Trump's critics were dangerous, unpatriotic, and evil." At sentencing, Sayoc said before he mailed the bombs his idea "first was how to tone down the liberal left violence platform." He wrote that he believed prominent Democrats were encouraging violence, and said that he had been attacked personally.

=== Incarceration ===
On October 22, 2019, Sayoc began serving his 20-year sentence at United States Penitentiary, Marion. In February 2022, Sayoc was transferred from Marion, Illinois to the FCI Butner Medium II in Butner, North Carolina. He is now located at FCI Coleman Low in Sumterville, Florida. His earliest possible release date is November 10, 2035.

== Reactions ==
=== Political ===
"President Trump Condemns Mailing of Explosive Devices to Democrats", from a speech made at the White House on October 24 (video from Voice of America)

Hillary Clinton thanked the Secret Service for intercepting the package and during a political event in Florida on behalf of Congressional candidate Donna Shalala she stated "Every day we are grateful for their commitment, and obviously never more than today, but it is a troubling time isn't it? And it's a time of deep divisions, and we have to do everything we can to bring our country together." John Brennan pointed directly to Trump's rhetoric, saying that Trump "fuels these feelings and sentiments that now are bleeding over into potential acts of violence ... Unfortunately, I think Donald Trump, too often, has helped to incite some of these feelings of anger, if not violence, when he points to acts of violence or also talks about, you know, swinging at somebody from the press or the media."

Several sources pointed out that some of the targets of the mailings, such as Clinton and Waters, are people that Trump routinely attacks at his campaign rallies – his "favorite punching bags." New York Mayor Bill de Blasio described the packages as "an act of terror" and stated that all politicians must stop encouraging attacks on media. Biden said of the attempts, "we've got to turn off this hate machine." Wasserman Schultz responded saying, "We will not be intimidated by this attempted act of violence. This appalling attack on our democracy must be vigorously prosecuted, and I am deeply disturbed by the way my name was used." Waters said, "I don't know whether the bombs are real or not, but we should not crawl under the bed, close the doors, not go out, be afraid to go to rallies. We have to keep to doing what we're doing in order to make this country right; that's what I intend to do, and as the young people say, I ain't scared."

==== President Trump's responses ====
Trump held a midterm campaign rally in Mosinee, Wisconsin, on October 24, during the height of the mailings. He said of the bombings:

My highest duty, as you know, as President, is to keep America safe. That's what we talk about. That's what we do. The federal government is conducting an aggressive investigation and we will find those responsible and we will bring them to justice. Hopefully very quickly. Any acts or threats of political violence are an attack on our democracy, itself. No nation can succeed that tolerates violence or the threat of violence as a method of political intimidation, coercion, or control. We all know that. Such conduct must be fiercely opposed and firmly prosecuted. We want all sides to come together in peace and harmony. We can do it. We can do it. We can do it. It will happen.

The next day, Trump claimed on Twitter that the mainstream media were largely responsible for anger present in American society. His comments were echoed by former White House Press Secretary Sarah Huckabee Sanders, who said that Trump had urged the public to come together and had sent a very clear, strong unmistakable message that acts or threats of political violence had no standing in the United States. Sanders then attacked statements by CNN President Jeff Zucker, claiming that he "chose to attack and divide." Trump also tweeted against the media, on October 24, stating, "Funny how lowly rated CNN, and others, can criticize me at will, even blame me for the current state of Bombs [sic] and ridiculously comparing this to September 11th and the Oklahoma City bombing, yet when I criticize them they go wild and scream, 'it's just not Presidential! [sic]'"

Appearing before a group of young black conservatives an hour after the arrest, Trump praised the swift action by law enforcement and promised "swift and certain justice." He added, "We must never allow political violence to take root in America. We cannot let it happen. I am committed to do everything in my power as president to stop it and stop it now." A few minutes later he attacked Democrats and the media, to cheers from the crowd. Later in the day he told reporters that he was in no way to blame for the attacks and had no plans to do anything differently. Asked if he might tone down his rhetoric in response to the mail bombs, he replied, "Tone down, no. Could tone up. I think I've been toned down, if you want to know the truth."

On October 26, Trump claimed that news coverage of the pipe bombs targeting Democratic politicians and critics of his policies had drowned out other news stories and slowed Republican voting in the mid-term election. He tweeted, "Republicans were doing so well in early voting, and at the polls, and now this 'Bomb' stuff happens and the momentum greatly slows – news not talking politics. Very unfortunate, what is going on."

=== Media ===
CNN President Jeff Zucker said about the mailings, "There is a total and complete lack of understanding at the White House about the seriousness of their continued attacks on the media. The president, and especially the White House press secretary, should understand their words matter. Thus far, they have shown no comprehension of that." Zucker later stated that all mail sent to any CNN building will now be screened offsite. CNN also reported that the bombings were one of three hate-motivated incidents that took place in the United States the same week, along with shootings in a synagogue in Pittsburgh and a Kroger grocery store in Jeffersontown, Kentucky.

Following the news of the events, the hashtag "#MAGABomber" began trending on Twitter, referring to Trump's 2016 campaign slogan, "MAGA" (Make America Great Again).

=== Conspiracy theories ===
The incident has been the subject of conspiracy theories saying the events are part of a false flag operation, that the attacks were staged by those who hoped to cast the blame on Trump supporters. When the incidents were first reported, conservatives such as columnist Kurt Schlichter and conspiracy theorist and radio host Alex Jones issued social media posts and articles through InfoWars to assert their belief that the incidents were false flags, a "super convenient turn of events", and a potential "political stunt". Many of the comments were deleted as more information was received about the case.

After having been started by overtly conspiracist outlets, the false flag narrative was later picked up by some mainstream conservatives. Commentator Rush Limbaugh said that Republicans could not be responsible for the packages, that "Republicans just don't do this kind of thing. Even though every event, like mass shootings, remember, every mass shooting there is, the Democrats in the media try to make everybody think right off the bat that some tea partier did it, or some talk radio fan did it, or some Fox News viewer did it. Turns out, it's never, ever the case." Limbaugh instead raised unsubstantiated claims that the perpetrator might have been a "Democrat operative ... attempting to create the appearance that there are mobs everywhere." Other right-wing commentators who tried to spread the "false flag" conspiracy theories included Ann Coulter, Dinesh D'Souza, Michael Savage, James Woods, Frank Gaffney, Candace Owens, and Laura Loomer.

== See also ==
- Austin serial bombings
- Congressional baseball shooting
- December 2018 Time Warner Center bomb threats
- CNN v. Trump, a November 2018 lawsuit involving CNN and President Trump
- 2018 Tallahassee shooting
- 1919 United States anarchist bombings
- List of terrorist incidents in October 2018
- List of members of the United States Congress killed or wounded in office
- Right-wing terrorism
- 2021 United States Capitol attack
- Solomon Peña, 2022 Republican candidate for the 14th district of the New Mexico House of Representatives, was arrested in January 2023 for allegedly orchestrating at least four drive-by shootings against various Democratic politicians.
