= List of United States federal prisons =

The seal of the Federal Bureau of Prisons, the agency that manages U.S. federal prisons

The Federal Bureau of Prisons of the United States Department of Justice classifies prisons into seven categories:

- United States penitentiaries
- Federal correctional institutions
- Private correctional institutions
- Federal prison camps
- Administrative facilities
- Federal correctional complexes
- Former Federal facilities

This list does not include military prisons, halfway houses, or prisons, jails, and other facilities operated by state or local governments that contract with the Federal Bureau of Prisons. It also does not include facilities operated by Immigration and Customs Enforcement (ICE).

== United States penitentiaries ==
Most United States penitentiaries (USPs) are high-security facilities, which have highly secured perimeters with walls or reinforced fences, multiple and single-occupant cell housing, the highest staff-to-inmate ratio, and close control of inmate movement. The most restrictive facility in the federal prison system is USP Florence ADMAX, the federal supermax prison, which holds inmates who are considered the most dangerous and in need of the tightest controls.

USP Leavenworth, USP Lewisburg, USP Lompoc, and USP Marion were originally operated as high-security facilities but have since been downgraded to medium-security facilities (former USP Lompoc has again been downgraded, to low-security). USP Atlanta, also a former high-security facility, is a low-security facility with the primary purpose of holding inmates until they are transferred to other institutions. In 2024, all former USP facilities were renamed to Federal correctional institution (FCI) facilities to more accurately reflect their security level. Many USPs include minimum-security satellite camps on the same property and under the same administration as the higher-security units.

Name	Location	Inmate gender	Security class	Population (2025)	Ref.
United States Penitentiary, Administrative Maximum Facility	Colorado	Male	Administrative (Maximum)	382	
United States Penitentiary, Allenwood	Pennsylvania	Male	High	304	
United States Penitentiary, Atwater	California	Male	High	1,103	
United States Penitentiary, Beaumont	Texas	Male	High	1,346	
United States Penitentiary, Big Sandy	Kentucky	Male	High	1,236	
United States Penitentiary, Canaan	Pennsylvania	Male	High	1,379	
United States Penitentiary, Coleman	Florida	Male	High	1,345 (I); 982 (II)	
United States Penitentiary, Florence	Colorado	Male	High	786	
United States Penitentiary, Hazelton	West Virginia	Male	High	1,398	
United States Penitentiary, Lee	Virginia	Male	High	1,198	
United States Penitentiary, McCreary	Kentucky	Male	High	1,355	
United States Penitentiary, Pollock	Louisiana	Male	High	855	
United States Penitentiary, Terre Haute	Indiana	Male	High	1,136	
United States Penitentiary, Tucson	Arizona	Male	High	975	
United States Penitentiary, Victorville	California	Male	High	1,119	

== Federal correctional institutions ==
Federal correctional institutions (FCIs) are medium- and low-security facilities, which have strengthened perimeters (often double fences with electronic detection systems), mostly cell-type housing, a wide variety of work and treatment programs. FCI Terre Haute and FCI Marion contain highly restrictive communication management units, which hold inmates under stricter controls.

Name	Location	Inmate gender	Security class	Population (2025)	Ref.
Federal Correctional Institution, Aliceville	Alabama	Female	Low	1,137	
Federal Correctional Institution, Allenwood Low	Pennsylvania	Male	Low	1,030	
Federal Correctional Institution, Allenwood Medium	Pennsylvania	Male	Medium	1,126	
Federal Correctional Institution, Atlanta	Georgia	Male	Low	1,854	
Federal Correctional Institution, Ashland	Kentucky	Male	Low	1,163	
Federal Correctional Institution, Bastrop	Texas	Male	Low	1,013	
Federal Correctional Institution, Beaumont Low	Texas	Male	Low	1,615	
Federal Correctional Institution, Beaumont Medium	Texas	Male	Medium	1,182	
Federal Correctional Institution, Beckley	West Virginia	Male	Medium	1,534	
Federal Correctional Institution, Bennettsville	South Carolina	Male	Medium	1,515	
Federal Correctional Institution, Berlin	New Hampshire	Male	Medium	805	
Federal Correctional Institution, Big Spring	Texas	Male	Low	496	
Federal Correctional Institution, Butner Low	North Carolina	Male	Low	1,010	
Federal Correctional Institution, Butner Medium I	North Carolina	Male	Medium	533	
Federal Correctional Institution, Butner Medium II	North Carolina	Male	Medium	1,549	
Federal Correctional Institution, Coleman Low	Florida	Mixed	Low	1,601	
Federal Correctional Institution, Coleman Medium	Florida	Male	Medium	1,496	
Federal Correctional Institution, Cumberland	Maryland	Male	Medium	884	
Federal Correctional Institution, Danbury	Connecticut	Mixed	Low	1,132	
Federal Correctional Institution, Edgefield	South Carolina	Male	Medium	1,251	
Federal Correctional Institution, El Reno	Oklahoma	Male	Medium	1,001	
Federal Correctional Institution, Elkton	Ohio	Male	Low	1,605	
Federal Correctional Institution, Englewood	Colorado	Male	Low	960	
Federal Correctional Institution, Estill	South Carolina	Male	Medium	102	
Federal Correctional Institution, Fairton	New Jersey	Male	Medium	728	
Federal Correctional Institution, Florence	Colorado	Male	Medium	1,044	
Federal Correctional Institution, Forrest City Low	Arkansas	Male	Low	1,621	
Federal Correctional Institution, Forrest City Medium	Arkansas	Male	Medium	1,618	
Federal Correctional Institution, Fort Dix	New Jersey	Male	Low	3,859	
Federal Correctional Institution, Gilmer	West Virginia	Male	Medium	1,177	
Federal Correctional Institution, Greenville	Illinois	Mixed	Medium	1,177	
Federal Correctional Institution, Hazelton	West Virginia	Mixed	Medium	1,537	
Federal Correctional Institution, Herlong	California	Male	Medium	865	
Federal Correctional Institution, Jesup	Georgia	Male	Medium	1,055	
Federal Correctional Institution, La Tuna	Texas	Male	Low	550	
Federal Correctional Institution, Leavenworth	Kansas	Male	Medium	1,405	
Federal Correctional Institution, Lewisburg	Pennsylvania	Male	Medium	520	
Federal Correctional Institution, Lompoc I	California	Male	Low	886	
Federal Correctional Institution, Lompoc II	California	Male	Low	1,924	
Federal Correctional Institution, Loretto	Pennsylvania	Male	Low	781	
Federal Correctional Institution, Manchester	Kentucky	Male	Medium	1,009	
Federal Correctional Institution, Marianna	Florida	Mixed	Medium	890	
Federal Correctional Institution, Marion	Illinois	Male	Medium	1,005	
Federal Correctional Institution, McDowell	West Virginia	Male	Medium	1,483	
Federal Correctional Institution, McKean	Pennsylvania	Male	Medium	919	
Federal Correctional Institution, Memphis	Tennessee	Male	Low	996	
Federal Correctional Institution, Mendota	California	Male	Medium	628	
Federal Correctional Institution, Miami	Florida	Male	Low	824	
Federal Correctional Institution, Milan	Michigan	Male	Low	1,536	
Federal Correctional Institution, Oakdale I	Louisiana	Male	Low	971	
Federal Correctional Institution, Oakdale II	Louisiana	Male	Low	994	
Federal Correctional Institution, Otisville	New York	Male	Medium	746	
Federal Correctional Institution, Oxford	Wisconsin	Male	Low	1,157	
Federal Correctional Institution, Pekin	Illinois	Mixed	Medium	1,031	
Federal Correctional Institution, Petersburg Low	Virginia	Male	Low	467	
Federal Correctional Institution, Petersburg Medium	Virginia	Male	Medium	1,654	
Federal Correctional Institution, Phoenix	Arizona	Mixed	Medium	853	
Federal Correctional Institution, Pollock	Louisiana	Male	Medium	1,439	
Federal Correctional Institution, Ray Brook	New York	Male	Medium	856	
Federal Correctional Institution, Safford	Arizona	Male	Low	663	
Federal Correctional Institution, Sandstone	Minnesota	Male	Low	1,233	
Federal Correctional Institution, Schuylkill	Pennsylvania	Male	Medium	1,002	
Federal Correctional Institution, Seagoville	Texas	Male	Low	1,357	
Federal Correctional Institution, Sheridan	Oregon	Male	Medium	1,240	
Federal Correctional Institution, Talladega	Alabama	Male	Medium	958	
Federal Correctional Institution, Tallahassee	Florida	Mixed	Low	1,186	
Federal Correctional Institution, Terminal Island	California	Male	Low	937	
Federal Correctional Institution, Terre Haute	Indiana	Male (Note: Lisa Montgomery was transferred to FCI Terre Haute on January 11, 2021 and resided in its execution facility under solitary confinement for two days. Montgomery was executed by lethal injection on January 13, 2021 after President Donald Trump refused her request for clemency.)	Medium	1,112	
Federal Correctional Institution, Texarkana	Texas	Male	Low	1,108	
Federal Correctional Institution, Three Rivers	Texas	Male	Medium	1,058	
Federal Correctional Institution, Thomson	Illinois	Male	Low	1,967	
Federal Correctional Institution, Tucson	Arizona	Mixed	Medium	433	
Federal Correctional Institution, Victorville Medium I	California	Male	Medium	1,340	
Federal Correctional Institution, Victorville Medium II	California	Male	Medium	1,254	
Federal Correctional Institution, Waseca	Minnesota	Female	Low	855	
Federal Correctional Institution, Williamsburg	South Carolina	Male	Medium	1,357	
Federal Correctional Institution, Yazoo City Low I	Mississippi	Male	Low	1,566	
Federal Correctional Institution, Yazoo City Low II	Mississippi	Male	Low	1,549	
Federal Correctional Institution, Yazoo City Medium	Mississippi	Male	Medium	1,498	

== Federal prison camps ==
Federal prison camps (FPCs) are minimum-security facilities, which have dormitory housing, a relatively low staff-to-inmate ratio, and limited or no perimeter fencing. These institutions are work- and program-oriented. Many are located adjacent to larger institutions or on military bases, where inmates help serve the labor needs of the larger institution or base.

Name	Location	Inmate gender	Security class	Population (2025)	Ref.
Federal Prison Camp, Alderson	West Virginia	Female	Minimum	587	
Federal Prison Camp, Bryan	Texas	Female	Minimum	647	
Federal Prison Camp, Duluth	Minnesota	Male	Minimum	188	
Federal Prison Camp, Montgomery	Alabama	Male	Minimum	863	
Federal Prison Camp, Morgantown	West Virginia	Male	Minimum	166	
Federal Prison Camp, Pensacola	Florida	Male	Minimum	434	
Federal Prison Camp, Victorville	California	Female	Minimum	216	
Federal Prison Camp, Yankton	South Dakota	Male	Minimum	520	

== Private correctional institutions ==
In August 2016, Justice Department officials announced that the FBOP would be phasing out its use of contracted facilities, on the grounds that private prisons provide less safe and less effective services with no substantial cost savings. However, under the Trump administration in 2017, the Justice Department rescinded this phaseout, stating that it would re-implement its usage of private correctional facilities.

Most of these institutions are operated by the GEO Group, Inc., the exception being McRae Correctional Institution, operated by CoreCivic.

Name	Location	Ref.
Correctional Institution, Big Spring	Texas	
Correctional Institution, Big Spring (Flightline)	Texas	
Correctional Institution, Great Plains	Oklahoma	
Correctional Institution, McRae	Georgia	
Correctional Institution, North Lake	Michigan	
Correctional Institution, Reeves I & II	Texas	
Correctional Institution, Reeves III	Texas	

== Administrative facilities ==
Administrative facilities are institutions with special missions, such as the detention of pretrial offenders; the treatment of inmates with serious or chronic medical problems; or the containment of extremely dangerous, violent, or escape-prone inmates. Administrative facilities include metropolitan correctional centers (MCCs), metropolitan detention centers (MDCs), federal detention centers (FDCs), federal medical centers (FMCs), the Federal Transfer Center (FTC), and the Medical Center for Federal Prisoners (MCFP), all of which are capable of holding inmates in all security categories.

=== Federal Detention Facilities ===
Name	Location	Inmate gender	Population (2025)	Ref.
Federal Detention Center, Honolulu	Hawaii	Mixed	294	
Federal Detention Center, Houston	Texas	Mixed	855	
Federal Detention Center, Miami	Florida	Mixed	1,428	
Federal Detention Center, Philadelphia	Pennsylvania	Mixed	909	
Federal Detention Center, SeaTac	Washington	Mixed	785	
Metropolitan Correctional Center, Chicago	Illinois	Mixed	506	
Metropolitan Correctional Center, San Diego	California	Mixed	522	
Metropolitan Detention Center, Brooklyn	New York	Mixed	1,328	
Metropolitan Detention Center, Guaynabo	Puerto Rico	Mixed	1,053	
Metropolitan Detention Center, Los Angeles	California	Mixed	950	

=== Federal Medical Centers ===
Name	Location	Inmate gender	Population (2025)	Ref.
Federal Medical Center, Butner	North Carolina	Male	830	
Federal Medical Center, Carswell	Texas	Female	982	
Federal Medical Center, Devens	Massachusetts	Male	1,063	
Federal Medical Center, Fort Worth	Texas	Male	1,513	
Federal Medical Center, Lexington	Kentucky	Mixed	1,058	
Federal Medical Center, Rochester	Minnesota	Male	811	
Medical Center for Federal Prisoners, Springfield	Missouri	Male	1,068	

=== Federal Transfer Centers ===
Name	Location	Inmate gender	Population (2025)	Ref.
Federal Transfer Center, Oklahoma City	Oklahoma	Mixed	1,146	

== Former federal facilities ==
This list enumerates facilities that were formerly owned by the Federal Bureau of Prisons.

Name	Location	Closed
Camp Columbia Federal Prison	Washington	1947
Chillicothe Federal Reformatory	Ohio	c. 1950s
Catalina Federal Honor Camp	Arizona	1951
United States Penitentiary, Alcatraz Island	California	1963
United States Penitentiary, McNeil Island	Washington	1982
Metropolitan Correctional Center, New York	New York	2021
Federal Prison Camp, Eglin	Florida	2006
Federal Prison Camp, Nellis	Nevada	2005
Federal Prison Camp, Boron	California	2000
Federal Prison Camp, Seymour Johnson	North Carolina	2005
Taft Correctional Institution	California	2020

== See also ==
- Incarceration in the United States
- List of immigrant detention sites in the United States
