= Federal Correctional Institution, Big Spring =

Low-security prison in Texas, US

Coordinates: 32.22851°N 101.50559°W

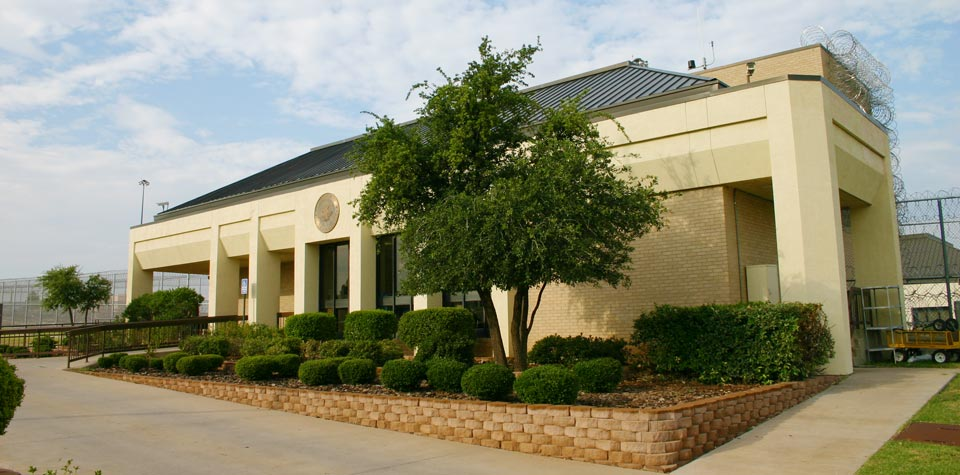
- Interactive map of Federal Correctional Institution, Big Spring
- Location: Big Spring, Howard County, Texas
- Status: Operational
- Security class: Low-security (with minimum-security prison camp)
- Population: 1,018 plus (114 plus in prison camp)
- Opened: 1979
- Managed by: Federal Bureau of Prisons
- Warden: Chad Humphrey

The Federal Correctional Institution, Big Spring (FCI Big Spring) is a low-security United States federal prison for male inmates in Texas. It is operated by the Federal Bureau of Prisons, a division of the United States Department of Justice. The facility also has a satellite prison camp which houses minimum-security male offenders.

FCI Big Spring is located in the city of Big Spring, Texas, midway between Dallas and El Paso. The town is also the location of the privately owned and operated Big Spring Correctional Center, which contracts with the FBOP to house federal detainees at four locations. Both FCI Big Spring and the BSCC occupy buildings and facilities repurposed from the closed Webb Air Force Base.

== Notable inmates (current and former) ==
Inmate Name	Register Number	Photo	Status	Details
Robert Courtney	14536-045		Now at FCI Englewood; scheduled for release in 2026.	Former pharmacist; pleaded guilty in 2002 to deliberately diluting the chemotherapy drugs of an estimated 4,200 cancer patients for profit; known as "The Toxic Pharmacist;" the story was featured on the CNBC television show American Greed.
Dias Kadyrbayev	95091-038		Released in 2018 and deported to Kazakhstan.	Friend of Dzhokhar Tsarnaev, perpetrator of the 2013 Boston Marathon bombing; pleaded guilty in 2015 to conspiring to obstructing justice for retrieving and disposing of evidence in order to impede the bombing investigation.
Juan Carlos de la Cruz Reyna	98832-179		Serving a 135-month (11.25 year) sentence; released into Mexican custody 19 October 2021.	Gulf Cartel leader who assaulted two U.S. federal agents in Mexico in 1999. He was convicted of assault in 2009. In 2012, he was convicted of bribery for attempting to pay off a U.S. undercover agent to arrange his release to members of his criminal group.
Anthony Pellicano	21568-112		Released in 2019 after serving a fifteen-year sentence.	Former private investigator for celebrities including Michael Jackson, Tom Cruise and Steven Seagal; convicted in 2008 of illegal wiretapping, racketeering and wire fraud. Later transferred to FCI Terminal Island. before being released in 2019.
David Duke	28213-034		Released in 2004	Politician and white nationalist convicted of tax fraud.
Leland Yee	19629-111		Served a 5-year sentence; released on June 26, 2020.	Former California state senator charged with public corruption and gun trafficking. Pled guilty to a felony racketeering charge in relation to money laundering, public corruption and bribery in a San Francisco Chinatown organized crime case.
Islam Said	06597-509		Serving a 10-year sentence, scheduled for release in 2028.	Son of Yaser Abdel Said. Pled guilty to harboring a fugitive, conspiring to harbor a fugitive, and one count of conspiracy to obstruct justice.
Derek Chauvin	47849-509		Serving a 22 1/2 year sentence, scheduled for release in 2037.	Pleaded guilty to the murder of George Floyd on June 25, 2021.
Don Black	16692-034		Served a 2-year sentence; released November 15, 1984	Violation of the Neutrality Act.
Miguel Rodríguez Orejuela	14022-059		Serving a 30-year sentence; scheduled for release in 2028.	Co-founder of the now-defunct Cali Cartel, which was responsible for as much as 80% of the cocaine brought into the US in the 1970s and 1980s; co-founder Gilberto Rodríguez Orejuela was also serving a 30-year sentence.

== See also ==
- List of U.S. federal prisons
- Federal Bureau of Prisons
- Incarceration in the United States
