= Michael B. Faulkner =

American fraudster

Michael Faulkner
- Born: Dallas, Texas, United States
- Other name: CygonX
- Occupations: Businessperson; Author

Michael Blaine Faulkner, known as by his pseudonym CygonX is an American business executive, author, and convicted cybercriminal. He is the founder of Crydon Capital.

Faulkner is best known for his high-profile 2010 arrest and 360 months prison sentence for various electronic and finance-related crimes in USA v Faulkner case. He is currently incarcerated at a Federal Correctional Institution, Forrest City Medium in Forrest City, Arkansas the United States.

== Biography ==
Born in 1973, Faulkner grew up in Dallas, Texas, United States. He is a college graduate and has a background in database engineering, IT infrastructure, and telecommunications.

Faulkner was the founder of a private equity firm, Crydon Capital Corporation, where he served as a chief executive officer. He was also a founder and owner of the VoIP company Premier Voice.

In 2009, Faulkner was at the center of so-called Texas Data Center raids, when FBI entry teams stormed data centers, shut them down, and seized thousands of servers as evidence.

After a well-publicized pursuit, the FBI arrested Faulkner on January 15, 2010, at a private compound in Mexico on federal offenses related to charges of wire fraud. The FBI briefly believed Faulkner to have been killed during a border dispute in Honduras, and later discovered that Faulkner may have attempted to fake his own death. In his book, Faulkner asserts that he and his family were kidnapped from Mexico by an FBI rendition team.

He was first indicted in 2010. The indictment alleged persons involvement in cybercrime conspiracy using web hosting equipment and fraud of $15 million. Additionally, Faulkner was indicted with obstruction of justice.

In 2013, Faulkner pleaded guilty to one count of wire fraud, one count of obstruction of justice – hiding assets, as part of a plea agreement before the United States District Court for the Northern District of Texas in Dallas. He was sentenced to 360 months in prison plus 36 months of supervised release and ordered to pay over $18 million in restitution.

At the beginning of the federal case made against Faulkner, the FBI asserted that over 105 million dollars were stolen during the commission of the crimes for which they were later charged. The legal defense countered these claims, after which the government was only able to document 25 million in losses within United States jurisdictions. The government moved forward with federal seizures, and seized over one million in combined financial assets from the co-defendants, and over one million dollars in equipment owned and operated by the co-defendant's companies. However, the government was only able to seize $22,000 from Faulkner's US bank accounts, and nothing from Faulkner's company or accounts outside the United States. In addition to the 18 million assessed loss attributed to Faulkner himself, in pre-trial detention hearing the FBI asserted that Faulkner had stolen another 2 million dollars during his time as a fugitive in Mexico. To date, no additional money has been recovered from any of Faulkner's offshore bank accounts or corporate entities.

Faulkner, in his book, argues that he committed no fraud. Instead, his USA-based telecom companies used VoIP technology to route calls to and from Mexico, and used GSM channel banks to inject calls into the Telcel network in Mexico, therefore bypassing all American phone companies, the Mexican national phone company Telmex, and surveillance systems. He further states that the network was designed to save his telecom clients money, and not to avoid the surveillance.

== Bibliography ==
- Faulkner, Michael (2011). Invisible Banking: A Guide to Protecting Your Wealth
- Faulkner, Michael (2017). Blackhat Banking: A Hacker's Guide to Financial Security and Privacy
