= Muhammad Dakhlalla =

American from Starkville, Mississippi

Muhammad Oda "Mo" Dakhlalla is an American from Starkville, Mississippi, who attempted in 2015 to join the known terrorist organization ISIS with his girlfriend and fellow Mississippi State student, Jaelyn Young. On August 24, 2016, U.S. District Judge Sharion Aycock sentenced him to eight years in federal prison for his crimes.

== History ==
Dakhlalla was raised in Starkville, Mississippi, where his father, Oda H. Dakhlalla, is imam of the Islamic Center of Mississippi. Dakhlalla graduated from Starkville High School with a 4.0 GPA and attended Mississippi State University (also in Starkville, Mississippi) where he would graduate with a degree in psychology in 2015 (and be accepted to a master's program in psychology, also at Mississippi State University) prior to his arrest. In November 2014, when he was a senior and she was a sophomore, he met Jaelyn Young, a fellow undergraduate at Mississippi State University. Jaelyn Young, a former honors student and cheerleader, isolated herself from former friends and began wearing the traditional Muslim faith garment, a niqab, around the Mississippi State campus. While Young converted to Islam very shortly after meeting Dakhlalla, some reports state she had plans to convert beforehand. However, investigators do note that Young was a very central driver in the plan for both Young and Dakhlalla to leave their homes in Starkville, Mississippi and travel to Syria, by way of Turkey.

In 2014 and 2015, the pair watched a number of ISIS propaganda videos featuring Anjem Choudary, and came to believe that the American media offered a "complete cloud of falsehood." After that, Dakhlalla downloaded the ISIS guide to emigrating to Syria. In May 2015, the FBI made contact with Young on Twitter via an undercover agent, after she made pro-ISIS references, including her celebration of the killings of five U.S. servicemen in Chattanooga, TN. Soon thereafter, they also made contact with Dakhlalla in order to gather further evidence of their plans to join the terrorist group. Young, an honors student and chemistry major, stated her intent to be a medic for the terrorist organization. The FBI found additional evidence that Dakhlalla made statements asserting his usefulness in computers, education and media, and combat for ISIS. In 2015, Dakhlalla and Young were married in a secret Muslim faith ceremony, though they did not file civil papers. Part of the pretext used to disguise their intent to travel to Syria and join ISIS was a “honeymoon” to Turkey.

While they made elaborate plans for their journey, the two hid their intentions so poorly they came to the attention of various monitoring groups, including the Program on Extremism at George Washington University. They were arrested at Golden Triangle Regional Airport in Columbus, MS, on August 10, 2015, while attempting to board a flight to Turkey (via Europe) to meet their ISIS recruiter. It was intended this recruiter would meet them at the Blue Mosque in Istanbul, Turkey from where they would travel to Syria to be with fellow members of the terrorist organization.

== Sentencing ==
U.S. District Judge Sharion Aycock sentenced Dakhlalla to 8 years in prison and a further 15 years of probation on the charge of conspiring to provide material support to a terrorist organization. At the time of sentencing, he thanked the lead FBI agent for saving his life for preventing him from traveling to Syria.
