= Miracle cars scam =

US advance-fee scam (1997–2002)

The miracle cars scam was an advance-fee scam run from 1997 to 2002 by Californians James R. Nichols and Robert Gomez. In its run of just over four years, over 4,000 people bought 7,000 cars that did not exist, netting over US$21 million from the victims.

== Background ==
Robert Gomez was a 19-year-old security guard in Los Angeles, living with his coworker and friend, James R. Nichols. Gomez claimed that he was the adopted son of John Bowers, a wealthy food company executive living in Texas. Later, Gomez would tell Nichols that Bowers had died and asked Nichols to serve as the executor of the Bowers estate. On an earlier occasion, Nichols would also claim to have met Bowers at a country club in Long Beach, California. A year after they met, Gomez and Nichols decided to save money and would both move into Nichols's parents' home in Carson, California.

== Scam ==
Just before Christmas 1997, the then-23-year-old Gomez entered the "discipleship pulpit" of the Christ Christian Home Missionary Baptist Church in nearby Compton, where the Nichols family were longtime members. Gomez introduced himself as Bowers' adopted son and heir to an estate valued at $411 million. Gomez also announced that Bowers had been a devout Christian, and had left instructions in his will that his estate should "gift" a fleet of 16 low-mileage company and personal cars to fellow believers. While the vehicles were not individually identified by their vehicle identification numbers (VINs) or the serial numbers of their legal titles, they were described by their general types. The vehicles were described as late model leased luxury coupes and sedans (i.e., BMWs, Mercedes-Benzes, Lexuses, and Cadillacs), now the property of the deceased’s estate. Over the years, they had been used for both personal and company purposes and had been located around the country for personal and chauffeured company use. Gomez stated that Bowers' last will and testament intended that the cars would be gifted to Christians as a charitable bequest. The Christian beneficiary only had to pay a "conveyance fee" of roughly $1,000 to $1,100, each vehicle's estimated title transfer and tax liability. Once the estate cleared probate, the vehicles would be delivered to their new owners.

Gomez stated that the key details that could be used in the verification of this bequest (the VINs and/or title serial numbers, which were the definitive evidence of each vehicle's actual existence) were under seal, not to be publicly disclosed by the probate court until the estate's final disposition, objections disposed of (if any), and final probate of the "Bowers Estate" had been entered as both ruling and order by the court. Until that time, it was plausible that the actual details of the "estate", and the proposed disposition of its contents, could be withheld from general release and/or publication by a gag order imposed by the probate judge. Therefore, Gomez suggested, that to speed up the process of “God’s” cars going to “God’s” people, the intended recipients should pay their “transfer fees” upfront in advance, and then await the delivery of their cars. Later that day, church members flocked to Nichols' mother Rose with money orders and cashier's checks, as Nichols had said was required by the estate's "lawyers". One called the cars "miracle cars," since Bowers had intended them to be miracles for people who had led dreary lives, and the name stuck. Almost overnight, Rose Nichols "sold" $30,000 worth of cars to relatives and church members. Gomez and Nichols soon claimed that the fleet of company cars was much larger than the original 16 vehicles, and before long, the proceeds reached $1 million.

=== Expansion ===
News of the "miracle cars" was spread by word of mouth through the Christian community, and Rose was overwhelmed by the number of people coming forward. Nichols and Gomez then designated several "team captains" to handle "miracle car" sales; it was not long before they were overwhelmed as well. Later in 1998, Rose Nichols received a call from Gwen Baker, who worked for Primerica Financial Services in Memphis, Tennessee. She had heard about the Miracle Cars through her non-denominational charismatic church in Memphis, but was not just interested in buying them. Baker also recognized the money-making potential in helping to sell them. She flew to Los Angeles to meet Nichols and Gomez, who immediately hired her as a "National Finder" — a professional sales manager who could also set up a central office for operations. Baker then quit her job at Primerica and opened an office in Memphis. She worked primarily through pastors of other churches in the Southeast who told their followers about the cars. By early 2000, two other "National Finders" had joined the sales.

Sales figures were staggering. Missouri pastor Corinne Conway made $992,000 worth of finder's fees in 2000 alone. A professional car finder in Los Angeles bought $120,000 in one day, and former NFL players Neil Smith and Ricky Siglar bought a total of $700,000 worth of cars.

The promised delivery date was pushed back numerous times. However, the scammers readily distributed refunds to those who wanted them. As was typical of similar schemes, earlier marks could always be refunded their money in full, but were paid out of the proceeds of later victims. Additionally, no one was promised anything of actual cash value besides their miracle car. Once a victim decided they could no longer wait, they were only entitled to a full refund of the $1,000 to $1,100 they had paid. Out of 1,000 marks in a month, 80% were willing to wait and 10% asked for a refund, and Gomez and Nichols could easily meet the $100,000 in refund payments to the 10 percent who wanted their money back. To ensure that those willing to wait would not eventually demand their money back, Gomez used his friendship with the finance manager of a Toyota dealership in Gardena to fabricate letters stating that the cars were being stored in secure lots across the Los Angeles area.

It was later revealed that John Bowers did not exist, nor did his estate, the probate case, and most importantly, the cars. The money was being used primarily to finance Gomez's ambitions of becoming a professional gambler. Knowing that the holding companies for the casinos had names that sounded much like those of banks, Gomez had Nichols wire the proceeds from the scam to his accounts at the casinos. He once won nearly $1 million playing pai gow poker and often gambled with Larry Flynt. Nichols and Gomez ended their partnership in September 2001. Nichols used some of the proceeds from the scam to open a custom car parts business in Las Vegas.

== Investigation and trial ==
Higginsville, Missouri police chief Cindy Schroer heard about the large number of miracle cars being sold in her town and became suspicious. Eventually, at the end of 2000, she wrote an incident report and sent it to Missouri's attorney general. The report eventually wound up in the office of Todd Graves, the U.S. Attorney for Missouri's Western District. He turned the case over to one of his assistants, Dan Stewart.

An investigation was immediately launched, headed by U.S. Postal Inspector Steve Hamilton and IRS fraud expert Gary Marshall. Over the next two years, Hamilton and Marshall painstakingly followed the money trail. Initially thinking that the "National Finders" were the ringleaders, they contacted all three. The FBI tapped phones, monitoring conversations with Baker and Conway, who continued to sell cars even after being warned that the scheme may have been illegal. Eventually, Hamilton and Marshall discovered that Gomez, Nichols, Baker, and Conway had fleeced their customers out of $21.1 million, and $8.6 million went toward refunds.

On May 8, 2002, a Kansas City grand jury indicted Gomez, Nichols, and Baker on 23 counts each for interstate fraud and money laundering. Gomez was arrested on June 10, 2002 at a casino owned by Flynt. Nichols surrendered to authorities on July 20 at his attorney's office. Baker and Conway later self-surrendered to the FBI, and Conway was later added to the indictment.

On May 2, 2003, Conway pleaded guilty to felony tax evasion before U.S. District Court Judge Nanette Kay Laughrey; she had not paid taxes on the finder's fees earned in 2000. In return, she agreed to testify against Nichols and Gomez. She was sentenced to 14 months in federal prison and ordered to pay $4.9 million in restitution. On May 15, Baker pleaded guilty to two counts of interstate fraud before Laughrey in return for her testimony against Nichols and Gomez. She was sentenced to five years in prison and ordered to pay $12.5 million in restitution. Gomez and Nichols pleaded not guilty and took their chances with a trial in Kansas City, even though they risked spending the rest of their lives in prison if convicted (the charges carried a maximum sentence of 460 years in prison).

During the trial, witness after witness testified about how they had been duped. Car dealer Randy Lamb lost $218,000 in the scam and told the court that his losses nearly bankrupted him and kept his mother from retiring as planned. Greg Ross, a car salesman in San Juan Capistrano, who lost $120,000, testified that he demanded to speak with the manager of the bank servicing the Bowers estate. A few days later, Ross got a call from Bob Burrows, a First Bank and Trust loan officer in Lakewood, California. Burrows disclosed enough details about the account to assuage Ross's concerns somewhat, but could not be reached when Ross had more questions and got suspicious when Baker called him, wondering why he was checking up on them. Finally, Burrows called back, but while the "Bob Burrows" Ross spoke with a few days earlier had an unmistakable African American accent, this Burrows had a New England accent. Nichols took the stand in his defense, portraying himself as Gomez's victim.

On June 5, 2003, both men were found guilty of all 46 counts - 23 each of interstate fraud and money laundering. Gomez was sentenced to 21 years and 10 months in federal prison, and Nichols was sentenced to 24 years and four months; Nichols drew the stiffer sentence because Laughrey found that he had perjured himself on seven occasions during his testimony. Both were also ordered to pay $12.5 million in restitution. Gomez was fined an additional $8.7 million—an amount presumed missing. It was never established who was mainly responsible for the scam.

== Aftermath ==
The sentences were upheld on appeal to the 8th Circuit Court of Appeals.

John Phillips wrote two articles on the scam for Car and Driver, based on several interviews and letters from people involved in the case. In 2006, he wrote God Wants You to Roll, (ISBN 0786714433) a book chronicling the scam and trial.

On March 15, 2007, Laughrey approved a final restitution plan. Under this plan, 2,300 people who did not get refunds would be compensated on a pro rata basis. It is not known whether the missing $8.7 million was ever recovered. Checks started going out in the mail in March 2008; victims received 6% of their total loss.

In 2009, a documentary on the scam as part of the series American Greed aired on CNBC.
