= Federal Correctional Institution, Forrest City =

Federal prison in Arkansas, United States

- Interactive map of Federal Correctional Institution, Forrest City
- Location: Forrest City, Arkansas; 34°58′55″N 90°48′11″W
- Status: Operational
- Security class: Low-security (with minimum-security prison camp)
- Population: 1,900 (310 in prison camp)
- Opened: 1997
- Managed by: Federal Bureau of Prisons
- Warden: Chad Garrett

The Federal Correctional Institution, Forrest City (FCI Forrest City) is a United States federal prison for male inmates in Arkansas. It is part of the Forrest City Federal Correctional Complex (FCC Forrest City) and is operated by the Federal Bureau of Prisons, a division of the United States Department of Justice. FCC Forrest City is located in eastern Arkansas, 85 miles east of Little Rock and 45 miles west of Memphis, Tennessee.

The complex consists of four facilities:

- Federal Correctional Institution, Forrest City Low (FCI Forrest City Low): a low-security facility.
- Federal Correctional Institution, Forrest City Medium (FCI Forrest City Medium): a medium-security facility
- A satellite prison camp adjacent to the facility houses minimum-security male offenders.

The facility is named for the town of Forrest City, Arkansas, itself named for Confederate General Nathan Bedford Forrest.

== Facility and programs ==
FCI Forrest City opened in April 1997. Inmates are housed in dormitories with cubicles. Educational opportunities include GED, ESL, continuing education and parenting courses. Career counseling and vocational training are also available, as well as a drug treatment program. A federal industries program, known as UNICOR, employs 300 inmates and produces a furniture line called "Harmony." All inmates at FCI Forrest City are required to perform a job assignment, including cleaning services, clerical duties, masonry, plumbing, painting, landscaping and welding.

== In media ==
On October 10, 2013, FoxNews.com reported on how the United States federal government shutdown of 2013 was affecting employees at FCI Forrest City. Citing a story from WMC-TV, prison employees were unsure when the next time they would receive a paycheck amid the shutdown, but the inmates are continuing to get paid for jobs like landscaping. The report said that the inmates are still receiving checks because their funds come out of a trust fund that is not affected by the problems in Washington. About 600 workers at FCI Forrest City are impacted by the slimdown, the report said. "The inmates who have committed the crimes in this country and are incarcerated by violating the laws of common society, they’re not affected by the shutdown, but the employees that we trust to keep our communities safe are," Jeff Roberts, a prison employee who goes to work every day and does not get paid, told the station. Roberts added that there was concern among employees that they would be unable to pay bills.

== Notable inmates (current and former) ==
| Inmate Name | Register Number | Status | Details |
|---|---|---|---|
| Clifford Harris | 59458-019 | Released from custody in 2011; served 1 year. | American hip hop recording artist known as T.I.; pleaded guilty to federal weapons charges in 2008, returned to prison for probation violations. |
| Larry Lawton | 52224-004 | Released in 2007; served last portion of 11 years. | Ex-jewel thief and organized crime member. Lawton now helps and inspires younger people to stay out of prison and change their life path. |
| Ronald Sandlin | 27879-509 | Served a 63 month sentence; released December 2024, pardoned by President Donald Trump the next month. | Participated in the Capitol Attack. |
| Arthur J. Williams Jr. | 20308-424 | Released from custody in 2014; served 10 years. | Notorious counterfeiter; pleaded guilty in 2005 to printing $10 million in fake money; Williams's story was featured on the CNBC television program American Greed. |
| Beaudouin Ketant | 63255-004 | Served part of a 27-year sentence; released in 2015 due to his cooperation in federal drug cases. | Haitian drug kingpin and former ally of ex-Haitian President Jean-Bertrand Aristide; convicted in 2004 of directing the shipment of over 30 tons of Colombian cocaine into the US through Haiti from 1987 to 1996. |
| Michael B. Faulkner | 03829-078 | scheduled for release in 2034. | 360 months prison sentence for various electronic and finance-related crimes; An American author and businessperson. |
| Armando Villalobos | 12877-379 | Serving a 13-year sentence; transferred to RRM San Antonio. Released June 18, 2024. | Disgraced former District Attorney for Cameron County, Texas; convicted using testimony from Karen Lamon and Jeff Bell of Combes, Tx who became aware of his actions during Jeff Bell's and Karen Lamon's organized criminal activity running several illegal game rooms county wide. He was sentenced in 2014 for his role in a large south Texas extortion and bribery scheme from 2006 to 2012. Villalobos was convicted of accepting bribes and kickbacks in exchange for favorable prosecutorial judgement, reduced criminal charges, case dismissals, pretrial diversion agreements, and probationary matters. |
| Samuel Lightsey | 96285-020 | Served a 3-year sentence; released on September 29, 2017. | Operations manager at Peanut Corporation of America convicted of conspiracy, mail and wire fraud, and the sale of misbranded and adulterated food. |

== See also ==
- List of U.S. federal prisons
- Federal Bureau of Prisons
- Incarceration in the United States
