= Big Spring Correctional Center =

Private prison in Big Spring, Texas, United States

Coordinates: 32°13′29″N 101°30′59″W

- Interactive map of Big Spring Correctional Center
- Location: 1701 Apron Drive Big Spring, Texas 79720
- Status: open
- Security class: minimum
- Capacity: 3509
- Opened: 1989
- Managed by: GEO Group

The Big Spring Correctional Center (BSCC) is a privately-operated prison located in Big Spring, Texas, operated by the GEO Group under contract with the Federal Bureau of Prisons. It houses federal "deportable alien" detainees.

BSCC should not be confused with the federally-owned and operated Federal Correctional Institution, Big Spring in the same town, or its satellite camp. BSCC consists of four separate physical locations:

- "Airpark", at 1701 Apron Drive, opened 1991, capacity 564, housed in 13 buildings formerly part of the decommissioned Webb Air Force Base
- "Cedar Hill", at 3711 Wright Avenue, opened June 1998, capacity 520
- "Flightline", at 2001 Rickabaugh Drive, opened Feb 1995, capacity 520
- "Interstate", at 1801 W Interstate 20, opened 1989, capacity 417, in a converted 72-room former Ramada Inn

== Closure ==
In August 2016, Justice Department officials announced that the FBOP would be phasing out its use of contracted facilities, because private prisons provided less safe and less effective services with no substantial cost savings. The agency had expected to allow current contracts on its thirteen remaining private facilities to expire. However, Attorney General Jeff Sessions criticized the August 2016 decision and reversed it on February 22, 2017. The prison's contract is expected to be renewed as it approaches expiration.
