= Murder of Darrell Lunsford =

1991 murder of a Texas constable

- Dashcam footage from Lunsford's cruiser, moments before he was murdered
- Location: Garrison, Texas, U.S.
- Date: January 23, 1991; 35 years ago
- Target: Texas law enforcement officer
- Weapon: Firearm
- Victim: Darrell Lunsford
- Perpetrators: Baldemar Villarreal, Reynaldo Villarreal, Jesus Cortez Zambrano

On January 23, 1991, in Garrison, Texas, United States, police officer Constable Darrell Lunsford pulled over a suspicious vehicle. Inside the vehicle were three men transporting marijuana from Texas to Illinois. After Lunsford requested to search the trunk of the vehicle, the men exited the car, tackled Lunsford, beat, stabbed, and shot him after a struggle. They then drove off after killing him. Lunsford's dashboard camera in his police cruiser recorded the murder. Footage of the murder is used in law enforcement training. The date of the murder has been described as one of the most infamous dates in the history of Texas law enforcement.

== Murder ==
On Wednesday, January 23, 1991, at approximately 1:20 a.m., Constable Darrell Lunsford spotted a suspicious vehicle, a 1981 Oldsmobile Cutlass Supreme with Maine license plates traveling on U.S. Highway 59 through the town of Garrison. Lunsford pulled the vehicle over and turned on his dashboard camera to record the traffic stop. He then got out of his cruiser and approached the vehicle. Inside the vehicle were three men: Baldemar Villarreal; his younger half brother, Reynaldo Villarreal; and their accomplice, Jesus Cortez Zambrano. Lunsford questioned the driver, Reynaldo, and asked whether he had any identification on him, to which Reynaldo replied no. He claimed that he had a driver's license but did not have it on him. He also said that he was helping his brother, Baldemar, drive the car. Unbeknownst to Lunsford, the three men had loaded the car with 31 pounds (14 kg) of marijuana, and were driving from Houston to Chicago, where they planned to sell it all.

At 1:27 a.m., Lunsford asked to look in the trunk of the vehicle and the men reluctantly agreed. Lunsford and Reynaldo opened the trunk and Lunsford could immediately smell the scent of marijuana. At 1:28 a.m., Baldemar, despite being told not to, got out of the vehicle and stood with Reynaldo speaking to Lunsford. Suddenly, Baldemar grabbed Lunsford by his legs while Reynaldo grabbed him from behind, carrying out a "prison takedown" on Lunsford as they forced him down onto the ground by the side of the car. Zambrano then got out to assist his two partners in crime, and the three men proceeded to beat and kick Lunsford while he was pinned down on the ground. They rolled him over onto his stomach, kicked him in the hip three times, stabbed him repeatedly with a knife and then grabbed his own handgun. Baldemar shot Lunsford in the neck with the handgun, severing his spinal cord and killing him instantly. Moments afterwards, the suspects moved Lunsford's body into a nearby ditch. The three suspects then made a getaway in their vehicle, leaving behind Lunsford's body and his police cruiser.

== Victim ==
Darrell Lunsford

Darrell Edward Lunsford, Sr. was the Precinct 3 Constable for Nacogdoches County, Texas.

Lunsford was born on October 20, 1943, in Houston. He had one brother, who died in 1956. He married his wife, Shirley Jo Cotton, on September 29, 1962, and they had two children together. In addition to being the Precinct 3 Constable for Nacogdoches County, he also ran his own Auto Repair Shop and Parts Store in Garrison.

Lunsford first joined the police force in 1983 when the people of Garrison elected him as their Constable, and continued to serve in the force until his death in 1991. He was 47 years old at the time of his death.

== Aftermath ==
Just minutes before the murder, Sheriff's Deputy Don Welch had driven by and spotted Lunsford speaking to the men. Moments after the murder, Welch witnessed the suspects speed past him in their vehicle. Welch immediately drove back to the spot where Lunsford had been and found his dead body. Welch radioed for help, and at around 2:00 a.m., Chief Deputy Thomas Stanaland, another colleague of Lunsford, found them both. Stanaland noticed the video camera in Lunsford's cruiser. He rewound the video, watched it over and then made a copy of it. The three suspects, realizing Welch had spotted them, abandoned their vehicle less than a mile from the town of Garrison. They then fled on foot, taking the marijuana with them. Their vehicle was found later in the day.

Throughout the morning, the police analyzed the videotape and were able to identify the three killers. Reynaldo Villarreal was found later in the day when a highway patrolman spotted him walking near the edge of a wooded area. He was arrested and charged with murder. Baldemar Villarreal was captured and arrested two days later and Zambrano was captured a week later. All three suspects were then tried and convicted of Lunsford's murder.

The actual shooter was identified as Baldemar Sambrano Villarreal. He was sentenced to life in prison without parole. His younger half brother, Reynaldo Sambrano Villarreal, was sentenced to 40 years in prison for his role in the murder. The third suspect, Jesus Cortez Zambrano, pleaded guilty to his role in the murder and received a 30-year prison sentence. The video from Lunsford's dash camera is now frequently used in law enforcement training to teach officers how to handle similar situations.

According to the Federal Bureau of Prisons, Baldemar Sambrano Villarreal is incarcerated in the Federal Correctional Institution in Beaumont, Texas under registry number 03367-078. Reynaldo Sambrano Villarreal was incarcerated in the United States Penitentiary near Lewisburg, Pennsylvania under registry number 03368-078. He has since been transferred to Federal Correctional Institution, Beaumont in Beaumont, Texas, and is scheduled for release on January 21, 2026. Jesus Cortez Zambrano was released from prison on March 22, 2018, having served 27 years of his original 30-year prison sentence.

== Effects of the video ==
Andy Lopez Jr. was a Texas state trooper stationed in Refugio, Texas, who had watched the video of Lunsford's murder. Eight months later, around 10:08 p.m., on September 21, 1991, a Saturday night, Lopez pulled over a suspicious vehicle along U.S. Highway 77 in Refugio. Similar to the events surrounding Lunsford's murder, three Hispanic males were transporting a large amount of marijuana in the trunk of the car. While they initially allowed Lopez to inspect the trunk, one of the suspects attempted to draw a handgun.

Lopez was able to react quickly to the assailant, knocking him off balance while drawing his own weapon, then firing and taking cover. The armed suspect was wounded, while the two remaining suspects fled on foot under cover of darkness. The armed suspect continued to fire on Lopez, who used strategic cover and motion while returning fire. Another trooper, then south of Lopez, responded to his call for backup. The armed suspect died from multiple gunshot wounds before help arrived. Lopez had not been severely injured, having been grazed only once.

A manhunt for the other two suspects was conducted throughout the night and into the next day. When police located the two remaining suspects, who had been hiding in the woods, they were arrested without incident. The shootout between Lopez and the gunman had been videotaped by a camera in Lopez's cruiser. After the incident, Lopez told authorities that he believed the video of Lunsford's murder is what had saved his life that night. The video had helped him deal with the three suspects and he had learned not to make the same mistakes that Lunsford had made eight months earlier. For his actions, Trooper Lopez was awarded the Texas Department of Public Safety Medal of Valor, the highest award a commissioned trooper can receive.

== See also ==
- Murder of Kyle Dinkheller
