= List of former inmates at ADX Florence =

This is a list of notable inmates who were once held at ADX Florence.

In the context of these individuals, "Residential Reentry Management Offices" are among other things the accounting placeholder for federal inmates being held in state institutions. This is usually as part of the "Interstate Compact for Corrections" which provides for the transfer of inmates from one state to another, or from federal to state custody or vice versa Simply put, if a state has an inmate that they cannot easily hold, either for security or medical reasons, then they can transfer that inmate to federal custody and in return the state agrees to provide custody for a federal inmate.

== Notable former inmates ==
=== Foreign terrorists ===
Inmate name	Register number	Photo	Status	Details
Omar Abdel Rahman	34892-054		Deceased. Died of natural causes on February 18, 2017, after transfer to a medical unit at the Federal Correctional Complex, Butner, in North Carolina, while serving a life sentence plus 15 years under the name Omar Ahmad Rahman.	Leader of the terrorist organization al-Gama'a al-Islamiyya; convicted in 1995 of seditious conspiracy for masterminding a foiled plot to bomb high-profile targets in New York City, including the United Nations, the Lincoln Tunnel, the Holland Tunnel, and the George Washington Bridge in what is known as the New York City landmark bomb plot, as well as conspiring to assassinate Egyptian President Hosni Mubarak. Nine followers are serving sentences at ADX and other federal facilities.
Eyad Ismoil	37802-054		Transferred to United States Penitentiary, Lee. Serving a 210-year sentence, which was reduced from 240-year sentence. Scheduled to be released on August 6, 2174.	Jordanian engineering student convicted alongside numerous other men for the 1993 World trade center bombing. Ismoil accompanied Ramzi Yousef in parking the van packed with explosives in the lower parking garage of the World Trade Center. As of 2024, Yousef and fellow conspirator Mahmud Abouhalima are the only members convicted of the 1993 bombing to still be held at ADX.
Ahmed Khalfan Ghailani	02476-748		Transferred to USP McCreary. Serving a life sentence.	Al-Qaeda terrorist convicted for his role in the bombing of embassies in Kenya and Tanzania. He was on the FBI Most Wanted Terrorists list from its inception in October 2001. In 2004, he was captured and detained by Pakistani forces in a joint operation with the United States, and was held until June 9, 2009, at Guantanamo Bay detention camp. He was then sentenced to life imprisonment in the United States and sent to ADX Florence, but then later transferred to USP McCreary.
Adis Medunjanin	65114-053		Transferred to the Communications Management Unit at FCI Terre Haute. Serving a 95-year sentence with an official release date of January 15, 2091.	Al-Qaeda operative; convicted in 2012 of plotting to conduct coordinated suicide bombings in the New York City subway system in September 2009; co-conspirators Najibullah Zazi and Zarein Ahmedzay pleaded guilty.
Ahmed Ajaj	40637-053		Transferred to USP Coleman I. Serving an 86-year sentence.	Convicted of participating in the 1993 World Trade Center bombing.
Khalid al-Fawwaz	67497-054		Transferred to USP Victorville. Serving a life sentence.	An Al-Qaeda operative from Saudi Arabia; convicted in connection with the 1998 United States embassy bombings in Kenya and Tanzania, Africa, which were conceived by Al-Qaeda leader Osama bin Laden; the bombings killed 224 people and injured more than 4,000.
Mohammed Odeh	42375-054		Transferred to USP Coleman I. Serving a life sentence.	Participated in the 1998 United States embassy bombings.
Wali Khan Amin Shah	42799-054		Transferred to FCI Terre Haute. Served a 30-year sentence; released in 2021.	Al-Qaeda operative; convicted in 1996 of terrorism conspiracy in connection with Project Bojinka, a foiled plot devised by senior Al-Qaeda member Khalid Sheikh Mohammed to bomb twelve passenger planes over the Pacific Ocean in a 48-hour period.
Mohammed A. Salameh	34338-054		Transferred to USP Marion. Serving an 86-year and 11-month sentence.	Palestinian terrorist, convicted perpetrator of the 1993 World Trade Center bombing.
Clement Hampton-El	34854-054		Deceased. Transferred to the United States Penitentiary, Marion, a medium-security facility in Illinois; serving a 35-year sentence; died on June 30, 2014.	Al-Qaeda operative; convicted for his involvement in the 1993 World Trade Center bombing and a plot to commit terrorist attacks against the United Nations and New York City landmarks.
Eljvir Duka	61282-066		Serving a life sentence plus 30 years. Transferred to USP Hazelton.	Three brothers and members of the group of six men that conspired to attack an Army Base in Fort Dix, New Jersey.
Shain Duka	61284-066		Serving a life sentence plus 30 years. Transferred to USP Atwater.	Three brothers and members of the group of six men that conspired to attack an Army Base in Fort Dix, New Jersey.
Dritan Duka	61285-066		Serving a life sentence plus 30 years. Transferred to FCI Terre Haute.	Three brothers and members of the group of six men that conspired to attack an Army Base in Fort Dix, New Jersey.
Oussama Kassir	05151-748		Transferred to FCI Terre Haute. Serving a life sentence.	Arrested in the Czech Republic in 2005 on an American warrant for conspiring to support terrorism by flying from London to Bly, Oregon, to set up a jihad terrorist training camp. Kassir allegedly spent 2 months in Bly, where he learned to train with firearms.
Yu Kikumura	09008-050		Released from federal custody and deported to Japan on April 18, 2007, after serving an 18-year and 5-month sentence.	Member of the Japanese Red Army terrorist organization; convicted of interstate transport of explosive devices in 1988.
Nidal Ayyad	16917-050		Transferred to USP Coleman I. Serving an 86-year sentence.	Sentenced for his involvement in the 1993 World Trade Center bombing. He helped coordinate the unsuccessful bombing and was arrested after the FBI matched his DNA to traces of saliva found on the letter's envelope.
Abdul Murad	37437-054		Transferred to USP Victorville. Serving a life sentence.	Al-Qaeda operative; convicted in 1996 of terrorism conspiracy in connection with planning Project Bojinka, a foiled plot conceived by senior Al-Qaeda member Khalid Sheikh Mohammed to bomb twelve planes over the Pacific Ocean in a 48-hour period.
Fares Khallafalla	34856-054		Served a 30-year sentence; released on July 19, 2019.	Follower of Sheikh Omar Abdel Rahman; convicted in 1995 of seditious conspiracy and terrorism conspiracy for planning to bomb high-profile targets in New York City as part of the foiled New York City landmark bomb plot. Several accomplices are serving sentences in other federal facilities.
Mohammed Al-Moayad	62044-053		Deceased. Served a six-year sentence; released from federal custody and deported to Yemen on August 9, 2009. Died on August 12, 2017.	Convicted of attempting to funnel millions of dollars in financial support to the terrorist organizations Al-Qaeda and Hamas.
Khalid Duhham Al-Jawary	31628-054		Served a 16-year sentence; released on February 19, 2009.	In 1973, Al-Jawary manufactured powerful explosives and left them in three rental cars near Israeli targets throughout New York City. He targeted two Israeli banks on Fifth Avenue and the El-Al cargo terminal at John F. Kennedy International Airport. The explosions were intended to occur on March 4 to coincide with a visit by Israeli Prime Minister Golda Meir. The bombs failed to detonate, but the construction and materials used allowed the FBI to link the explosives to the Black September letter-bombs and to Al-Jawary. Investigators matched 60 fingerprints from evidence with Al-Jawary's.
Khalfan Khamis Mohamed	44623-054		Transferred to USP Florence High. Serving a life sentence.	An Al-Qaeda operative from Tanzania; convicted in connection with the 1998 United States embassy bombings in Kenya and Tanzania, Africa, which were conceived by Al-Qaeda leader Osama bin Laden; the bombings killed 224 people and injured more than 4,000.
Mohamed al-Owhali	42371–054		Transferred to USP Florence High. Serving a life sentence.	British-born Saudi terrorist who is one of four individuals convicted in connection with the 1998 United States embassy bombings.

=== Domestic terrorists ===
Inmate name	Register number	Photo	Status	Details
Timothy McVeigh	12076-064		Executed on June 11, 2001, at the United States Penitentiary, Terre Haute, a high-security facility in Indiana which houses the federal execution chamber, as well as a federal men's death row. (Sentenced to death in 1997)	Sentenced to death for carrying out the 1995 Oklahoma City bombing of the Alfred P. Murrah Federal Building, which killed 168 people and is the deadliest domestic terrorist attack in US history. Accomplice Terry Nichols is currently serving 161 consecutive life sentences at ADX.
Ronald Griesacker	31482-077		Released from federal custody on February 19, 2004, after serving a three-year sentence.	Involved in the United States anti-government militia movement and former member of the pro-secession organization Republic of Texas; convicted in 1998 of bank fraud, mail fraud, and conspiracy charges for passing $2 million in counterfeit checks.
Theodore Kaczynski	04475-046		Deceased. Committed suicide by hanging on June 10, 2023, at FMC Butner while serving eight consecutive life sentences.	Known as the Unabomber; pleaded guilty in 1998 to building, transporting, and mailing explosives to carry out 16 bombings from 1978 to 1995 in a mail bombing campaign targeting those involved with modern technology, which killed 3 people and injured 23 others.
Ali Al-Tamimi	48054-083		Released to home confinement on September 1, 2020 and acquitted of all charges in 2026. Originally served a life sentence.	Former George Mason University assistant professor of biomedical genomics and Islamic lecturer convicted in 2005 of soliciting treason, based on comments he is alleged to have made to group of young Muslim men at a dinner shortly after 9/11. In a result that U.S. district judge Leonie Brinkema described as "very draconian," he received a mandatory lifetime prison sentence. On August 18, 2020, Judge Brinkema granted Al-Timimi's motion for release into home confinement pending his appeal, after concluding that recent legal developments made it more likely to succeed. Al-Timimi was released from ADX on September 1, 2020; He was acquitted of all charges in January 2026.
Zachary Adam Chesser	76715-083		Transferred to USP Hazelton and then to FCI McDowell. Serving a 25-year sentence; scheduled for release on January 1, 2032.	Convicted in 2010 for attempting to provide material support to a designated foreign terrorist organization by aiding al-Shabaab, a militant group with ties to al-Qaeda. He was also convicted for desensitizing law enforcement by ordering people to plant fake explosive devices. Chesser was also convicted for sending threats (via Revolution Muslim website) to Trey Parker and Matt Stone, creators of South Park, after they aired an episode of the show with depictions of Muhammad.
David Lane	12873-057		Deceased. Died of an epileptic seizure on May 28, 2007, while serving a life sentence at ADX.	Member of the Order, a white supremacist group; convicted of racketeering, conspiracy, and civil rights violations in connection with the 1984 murder of radio talk show host Alan Berg.
John Walker Lindh	45426-083		Transferred to the Federal Correctional Institution, Terre Haute. Served a 20-year sentence; released on May 23, 2019.	Convicted in 2002 of fighting with Taliban forces during the United States' 2001 invasion of Afghanistan; also known as the "American Taliban".
Oscar Lopez Rivera	87651-024		Transferred to the Federal Correctional Institution, Terre Haute, a medium-security facility in Indiana. Initially served a 55-year sentence plus 15 years. Sentence commuted by President Obama in 2017 (released on May 17) and returned to his native Puerto Rico.	A member of the Fuerzas Armadas de Liberación Nacional Puertorriqueña (FALN), a Puerto Rican militant group which carried out bombings in Chicago, Washington, DC, Newark, and Miami between 1974 and 1980.
Joseph Konopka	20749-424		Transferred to Chicago MCC. Released on July 29, 2019, after serving a 13-year sentence.	Pleaded guilty in 2002 to causing blackouts in Wisconsin by damaging power substations and utility facilities, as well as storing potassium cyanide and sodium cyanide in the Chicago subway system; also known as "Dr. Chaos".
El-Sayyid Nosair	35074-054		Transferred to USP Big Sandy. Serving a life sentence.	Al-Qaeda associate; convicted in 1995 of seditious conspiracy for receiving military training from Ali Mohamed of the Egyptian Islamic Jihad, as well as of committing the 1991 murder of Israeli politician Rabbi Meir Kahane.
Ahmed Omar Abu Ali	70250-083		Transferred to FCI Terre Haute. Serving a life sentence.	Al-Qaeda operative; convicted in 2005 of plotting to assassinate U.S. president George W. Bush. Federal prosecutors based their case on a confession Abu Ali provided to Saudi Arabian intelligence officials, which Abu Ali claimed was extracted by torture.
Tom Manning	10373-016		Deceased. Transferred to a medical unit at the USP Hazelton in West Virginia; scheduled for release on September 28, 2020, despite serving a life sentence handed out in 1987. Died in prison on July 31, 2019.	Member of the United Freedom Front, he engaged in numerous acts of domestic terrorism, including multiple bombings and bank robberies. He was also convicted for the 1981 murder of New Jersey State Trooper Philip Lomonaco.
Tarek Mehanna	05315-748		Transferred to FTC Oklahoma City. Served a 17-year sentence, Released on August 20, 2024.	American pharmacist convicted of conspiracy to provide material support to al-Qaeda, providing material support to terrorists (and conspiracy to do so), conspiracy to commit murder in a foreign country, conspiracy to make false statements to the FBI, and two counts of making false statements. Sentenced to 17 years in federal prison in April 2012.
José Padilla	20796-424		Transferred to United States Medical Center for Federal Prisoners then to MCC Chicago. Released on November 12, 2026, after serving a 21-year sentence.	Al-Qaeda operative and one of the first U.S. citizens to be designated as an enemy combatant after the September 11 attacks; convicted in 2007 of terrorism conspiracy for traveling overseas to attend an al-Qaeda training camp and for providing material support to terrorists.

=== Espionage ===
Inmate name	Register number	Photo	Status	Details
Harold Nicholson	49535-083		Released on November 24, 2023, after serving a 31-year and 7-month sentence.	Highest-ranking CIA officer to be convicted of espionage; pleaded guilty in 1997 to passing classified information to Russia from 1994 to 1996; pleaded guilty in 2010 to attempting to collect payments from Russian agents for his past espionage activities.
Robert Hanssen	48551-083		Deceased. Died of natural causes on June 5, 2023, while serving 15 consecutive life sentences at ADX.	Former senior FBI agent assigned to counterintelligence; pleaded guilty in 2002 to espionage for passing classified information to the Soviet Union and later to Russia over a 20-year period. This was regarded at the time as the worst intelligence disaster in U.S. history. Several undercover U.S. agents were executed based on the leaked information.
Christopher John Boyce	19347-148		Transferred to FCI Sheridan in Oregon, then released on March 14, 2003, on parole, having served 25 years out of a total 68-year sentence.	Convicted of selling United States spy satellite secrets to the Soviet Union in the 1970s, and escaping from FCI Lompoc.
Walter Myers	29796-016		Deceased. Died at MCFP Springfield on March 12, 2026, while serving a life sentence.	Convicted of espionage in relation to his spying activities for Cuba while working for the U.S. State Department.
Noshir Gowadia	95518-022		Transferred to MCFP Springfield Serving a 32-year sentence; scheduled for release on October 28, 2028.	Former engineer for the U.S. Department of Defense and one of the principal designers of the B-2 stealth bomber; convicted in 2011 of using classified information to assist the People's Republic of China with producing cruise missiles with stealth technology.

=== Organized crime figures ===
Inmate name	Register number	Photo	Status	Details
Salvatore Gravano	Unlisted		Placed in the Federal Witness Protection Program in return for turning government witness in 1991; served a 19-year sentence in an Arizona prison after being convicted on state narcotics charges. Released early in September 2017; was scheduled for release in March 2019.	Former underboss of the Gambino Crime Family; turned government witness and testified against boss John Gotti.
Vincent Basciano	30694-054		Transferred to USP Coleman. Serving two consecutive life sentences.	Former boss of the Bonanno Crime Family in 2004 after Boss Joseph Massino was arrested; convicted in 2006 of murder, conspiracy and racketeering; convicted in 2011 of ordering the 2004 murder of Bonanno associate Randolph Pizzolo.
Thomas Silverstein	14634-116		Deceased. Died due to complications from heart surgery on May 11, 2019, while serving a life sentence.	Aryan Brotherhood prison gang leader (considered one of the most dangerous inmates in the federal prison system); transferred to ADX after murdering Correction Officer Merle Clutts at USP Marion in 1983 while serving a sentence for bank robbery. The murder of two correctional officers in 1983 was the impetus for creating the "super-max" prison classification. One of the only prisoners publicly known to be incarcerated in Range 13.
Juan García Ábrego	09935-000		Transferred to USP Hazelton. Serving a life sentence.	Mexican former drug lord who is reported to be the former head of a criminal dynasty along the Mexico–United States border now called the Gulf Cartel.
James Sweeney	58827=066		Transferred to USP Victorville. Serving a life sentence.	Leader of Maryland prison gang Dead Man Incorporated, convicted of conspiracy to participate in a violent racketeering enterprise and conspiracy to distribute drugs and sentenced to life imprisonment.
Howard Mason	24651-053		Transferred to USP Allenwood. Serving a life sentence.	Convicted in 1989 of racketeering charges in connection with his leadership of "The Bebos," a violent drug gang in Queens, New York; ordered the 1988 murder of New York City Police Officer Edward Byrne. Transferred to USP Allenwood in 2015.
Barry Mills	14559-116		Deceased. Died on July 8, 2018, while serving four consecutive life sentences.	Aryan Brotherhood prison gang founder; along with Tyler Bingham, transferred to ADX in 2006 after being connected to violent gang activities in prison; convicted of murder, murder conspiracy, and racketeering for ordering the killing of two African-American inmates at USP Lewisburg in Pennsylvania.
Tex Hernandez	02536-748		Transferred to USP Florence High. Serving life sentences.	Leaders of the Nuestra Familia, convicted of racketeering for controlling the gang from the Security Housing Unit at Pelican Bay State Prison; found guilty due to Operation Black Widow, a federal investigation.
Cornelio Tristan	02550-748		Transferred to USP Florence High. Serving life sentences.	Leaders of the Nuestra Familia, convicted of racketeering for controlling the gang from the Security Housing Unit at Pelican Bay State Prison; found guilty due to Operation Black Widow, a federal investigation.
Joseph Lombardo	89305-024		Deceased. Died on October 19, 2019, while serving a life sentence.	Consigliere of the Chicago Outfit. On September 10, 2007, Lombardo was convicted of racketeering, extortion, loan sharking and murder. On September 27, 2007, the same jury found Lombardo guilty of the 1974 Seifert murder. In 2009, Lombardo, seated in a wheelchair, was sentenced to life in prison for the convictions.
Dandeny Muñoz Mosquera	37459-053		Transferred to United States Penitentiary, Lee. Serving a life sentence.	Colombian assassin for the Medellin Cartel known as "La Quica". Convicted for a placing a bomb on Avianca Flight 203 and blowing it up over Bogota which killed 107 people. This was considered one of the biggest drug-related terrorism cases in US history.
Salvador Magluta	26012-037		Transferred to United States Penitentiary, Allenwood. Serving a 195-year sentence.	Leader of a drug trafficking network in Miami that transported over 75 tons of cocaine into the United States. Convicted in 2002 of money laundering and conspiracy charges.
Anthony Casso	16802-050		Deceased. Transferred to the Terre Haute USP; died on December 15, 2020, while serving 13 consecutive life sentences plus 455 years.	Former underboss of the Lucchese Crime Family; apprehended in 1993 after 30 months on the run; subsequently pleaded guilty to murder, murder conspiracy and racketeering. Placed in the Federal Witness Protection Program, but was subsequently removed from the program due to multiple violations of program rules.
Nicodemo Scarfo	09813-050		Deceased. Transferred to the FCI Butner Medium, a medium-security facility; was serving a 55-year sentence, scheduled for release in 2033 but died on 17 January 2017 at age 87.	Former boss of the Bruno Crime Family in Philadelphia; he was convicted on multiple counts of murder, attempted murder, distribution of methamphetamine, and extortion.
Joel Cacace	25136-077		Transferred to USP Beaumont, then to FCI Tucson and finally to FCI Ashland. Released on May 22, 2020, after serving 17 years of a 20-year sentence.	Consigliere of the Colombo crime family, pled guilty to racketeering, extortion, illegal gambling, and participating in four murders in 2004.
Alpo Martinez	Unlisted		Deceased. Released in 2015 after serving 25 out of 35 years of his sentence. Died on October 31, 2021.	Former Harlem drug lord, convicted of 14 counts of murder, including the murder of his close friend and business partner Rich Porter. Facing the possibility of either the death penalty or life imprisonment without the possibility of parole, he testified against members of his drug organization. He was portrayed by rapper and actor Cam'ron in the 2002 film Paid In Full which was based on the criminal exploits of Martinez, Azie Faison and Rich Porter.
Clayton Fountain	89129-132		Deceased. Died in 2004 while serving a life sentence.	Aryan Brotherhood member who was serving a life sentence for murdering his staff sergeant while serving in the Marines. While imprisoned at USP Marion, he stabbed Correctional Officer Robert L. Hoffman to death on October 22, 1983. Fellow Aryan Brotherhood member Thomas Silverstein stabbed another correction officer, Merle Clutts, to death at USP Marion on the same day.
Osiel Cárdenas Guillén	62604-079		Transferred to USP Florence High, then to USP Lewisburg and finally to USP Terre Haute. Served a 25-year sentence; Released on August 30, 2024. Now at Federal Readaptation Prison No.1 at Mexico.	Succeeded Juan García Ábrego as leader of the Gulf Cartel; extradited to the U.S. from Mexico in 2007 and pleaded guilty to threatening to murder U.S. law enforcement agents, drug trafficking and money laundering.
James Morado	02846-748		Deceased. Died in 2021 while serving a life sentence.	Leader of the Nuestra Familia prison gang, arrested as part of Operation Black Widow in 2001 due to leading the gang from Pelican Bay State Prison.
John McCullah	03040-063		Currently at USP Allenwood; serving a life sentence.	Aryan Brotherhood prison gang member; fatally assaulted another inmate at the Federal Correctional Complex, Coleman in Florida in 2005 while serving multiple life sentences for other murders; Erin Sharma, a Correction Officer at the facility, was also sentenced to life in prison in connection with the assault.
Kenneth McGriff	26301-053		Transferred to the United States Penitentiary McCreary. Serving a life sentence.	Founder of the "Supreme Team," a violent gang which sold crack cocaine in Queens, NY. Convicted in 2007 of murder, racketeering, and drug trafficking.
Vito Rizzuto	04307-748		Deceased. Released and deported to Canada on October 5, 2012, after serving about five years of a ten-year sentence; died on December 23, 2013, of natural causes.	Rizzuto was the boss of the Italian–Canadian Rizzuto crime family, based in Montreal. In early 2004, Rizzuto was indicted by a Brooklyn federal grand jury in relation to racketeering conspiracy charges, including loansharking and murder, in connection with the May 5, 1981, gangland killings of three rival Bonanno crime family capos, Philip Giaccone, Dominick Trinchera and Alphonse Indelicato, made famous by the Hollywood movie Donnie Brasco. Rizzuto was one of four men hired by former Bonanno crime family captain Joe Massino to kill the three other capos. On August 17, 2006, after a legal battle of 31 months, he was extradited to the United States, and appeared before a United States magistrate judge of the United States District Court for the Eastern District of New York in Brooklyn. It was then, on May 4, 2007, Rizzuto pleaded guilty to conspiracy to commit murder as well as racketeering charges, admitting that he was present at the triple murder in 1981, but stated he had only yelled "it's a holdup", while others did the shooting; he received a 10-year prison sentence and was fined $250,000, to be followed by a three-year supervised release as part of the plea bargain.
Juan Matta-Ballesteros	37671-133		Deceased. Died at MCFP Springfield on October 30, 2025, while serving 12 consecutive life sentences under the name Juan Ramon Matta-Lopez.	Drug trafficker convicted of involvement in the 1985 kidnapping and murder of Drug Enforcement Administration Agent Enrique Camarena.
José Antonio Hernández	92043-280		Transferred to USP Coleman II. Serving a life sentence.	One of several known leaders of the La Línea gang.
Larry Hoover	86063-024		Transferred to Dixon Correctional Center, a state prison in Dixon, Illinois. Serving a 150–200 year state sentence.	Leader of the Gangster Disciples in Chicago; sentenced to life in state prison in 1973 for murder; convicted in 1997 of drug conspiracy, extortion, money laundering and running a continuing criminal enterprise for leading the gang from state prison. Hoover was sentenced to six federal life sentences in 1997 and subsequently transferred to ADX. On May 28, 2025, Hoover's federal life sentences were commuted by President Donald Trump.
Ronald Herron	78527-053		Transferred to USP Florence High. Serving 12 consecutive life sentences plus 105 years.	One-time Brooklyn rapper, Ronald Herron AKA Ra Diggs was tried and convicted in 2014 on 21 counts, including three murders, racketeering and drug trafficking in connection to running a violent drug gang in New York City.

=== Other ===
Inmate name	Register number	Photo	Status	Details
Christopher J. Scarver	08157-045		Placed in ADX after a mental evaluation. Transferred to the Wisconsin Secure Program Facility in 2000, currently housed at Centennial Correctional Facility in Cañon City, Colorado. Serving three consecutive life sentences.	Convicted murderer who, while serving a life sentence for a murder, murdered two inmates, Jesse Anderson and Jeffrey Dahmer, at Columbia Correctional Institution in Portage, Wisconsin, in November 1994.
Matthew F. Hale	15177-424		Transferred to Marion CMU in July 2020. Serving a 40-year sentence; scheduled for release on April 29, 2036.	Neo-Nazi convicted in attempting to solicit the murder of federal judge Joan Humphrey Lefkow, after she ruled against him in copyright case. Was held at ADX from 2005 to 2016 and found himself back at ADX later in 2016 before being transferred out again in 2020.
Charles Harrelson	02582-016		Deceased; died of a heart attack in March 2007 while serving a life sentence at ADX.	Convicted of murdering Federal Judge John H. Wood, Jr. in 1979 at the behest of a narcotics dealer; transferred to ADX after attempting to escape from the United States Penitentiary, Atlanta, a high-security facility, in 1995; father of actor Woody Harrelson.
Joseph Duncan III	12561-023		Deceased; died of Glioblastoma on March 28, 2021, while being held at the United States Penitentiary, Terre Haute, a high-security facility in Indiana which houses federal death row. (Sentenced to death in 2008)	Serial child molester and rapist; sentenced to death for a 2005 kidnapping and quadruple murder in Idaho.
Chevie Kehoe	21300-009		Serving three consecutive life sentences. Transferred to USP Terre Haute.	Murderer and white supremacist. Convicted in 1998 of the torture-murders of William, Nancy, and Sarah Mueller. Serving three life sentences. Accomplice Daniel Lewis Lee was sentenced to death, and executed on July 14, 2020.
Mutulu Shakur	83205-012		Deceased. Transferred to the Lexington FMC, served a 60-year sentence; released on parole on December 16, 2022, because of his declining health due to bone marrow cancer – it later claimed his life on July 7, 2023.	Convicted in connection with a 1981 bank robbery and shootout during which Brink's guard Peter Paige, as well as Sergeant Edward O'Grady and Police Officer Waverly Brown of the Nyack Police Department in New York State, were killed. Shakur is the stepfather of late rapper Tupac Shakur.
Richard McNair	13829-045		Transferred to United States Penitentiary, Florence High in November 2022, then to the Federal Transfer Center, Oklahoma City on October 23, 2023, and then to the United States Penitentiary, McCreary as of November 3, 2023. Serving two consecutive life sentences on a state murder charge from North Dakota in 1987.	Previously held at ADX due to multiple prison escapes; escaped from the Ward County Jail in Minot, North Dakota, in 1987, from the North Dakota State Penitentiary in Bismarck in 1992, and from USP Pollock in Louisiana in 2006.
Michael Rudkin	17133-014		Deceased. Transferred to USP Terre Haute, was serving a 90-year sentence until his death on August 24, 2021.	Former correction officer at FCI Danbury in Connecticut; sentenced to prison in 2008 for having sex with an inmate; convicted in 2010 of trying to hire a hitman to kill the inmate, his ex-wife, his ex-wife's boyfriend and a federal agent while incarcerated at USP Coleman in Florida. He was beaten to death by another inmate on August 24, 2021.
Daniel LaPlante	42370-066		Transferred to back to Massachusetts state custody in 2000.	Convicted of the rape and murder of Priscilla Gustafson and the murders of her two children.
Robby Alan Murphy	09049-031		Sentenced to over 20 years for various offenses, including prison stabbings in his affiliation as a member of the Aryan brotherhood. Since December 17, 2019, he is not in BOP custody.	Murphy had multiple assault and gun charges prior to an incident that involves the murder of another inmate as well as three correctional officers getting stabbed in USP Lompoc California in 2003

== See also ==
- List of U.S. federal prisons
- List of current inmates at ADX Florence
- Federal Bureau of Prisons
- Incarceration in the United States
