= Michael Finton =

American terrorist (born 1980)

- Born: Michael Curtis Finton; 1980 (age 45–46); Visalia, California
- Other name: Talib Islam (طالب إسلام)
- Occupation: Fry cook
- Status: Incarcerated at United States Penitentiary, Big Sandy
- Allegiance: al-Qaeda
- Motive: Terrorism
- Conviction: pled guilty
- Criminal charge: 1) attempt to murder, with malice aforethought, at least one US federal officer and employee; 2) attempt to use a weapon of mass destruction against property owned by the US.
- Penalty: 28 years incarceration

Michael C. Finton, also known as Talib Islam (Arabic: طالب إسلام – Ṭạlib Islām meaning "student of Islam"; born 1980), is an American convert to Islam and a part-time cook who attempted to bomb the Paul Findley Federal Building and the adjacent offices of Congressman Aaron Schock in downtown Springfield, Illinois, on 24 September 2009. He pleaded guilty in federal court on 9 May 2011 and was sentenced to 28 years in prison.

A resident of Decatur, Illinois, Finton was arrested by an undercover agent of the Federal Bureau of Investigation (FBI) Anti-Terrorism Task Force, who was posing as an Al-Qaeda operative. He was charged with attempted murder and attempted use of a weapon of mass destruction.

== Background ==
Finton has said he was born in Visalia, California, and moved with his family to Warren, Michigan, where he attended high school. He later moved to Illinois.

=== Assault conviction and conversion ===
On February 3, 1999, Finton robbed a store in Olney, Illinois, and injured the clerk on duty. Finton was convicted of aggravated assault and aggravated robbery, and spent 1999–2005 in prison.

During this period, he converted to Islam, and after leaving prison, he occasionally attended services at the Masjid Wali Hasan Islamic Center.

Finton admired Anwar Al-Awlaki, a Muslim lecturer suspected by the US government of having ties to Al-Qaeda (Al-Awlaki was killed by a US drone in September 2011 in Yemen). Finton had quoted the cleric on his Myspace page.

== Planning and attempting attack; arrest ==
After returning from a trip to Saudi Arabia in 2008, Finton happened to make contact with an undercover FBI agent, who posed as an Al-Qaeda operative. The FBI agent worked with him to plan an attack on the Springfield Federal Building and procure the supplies to carry it out.

On September 24, 2009, Finton drove a truck filled with an inert substance that he believed to be "a ton of explosives" to the federal courthouse building, parked, locked it, and left in another vehicle driven by the undercover FBI agent. Finton tried to detonate the dummy explosives remotely via cell-phone. He was arrested and placed in federal custody on charges of terrorism and attempting to kill a federal employee.

== Legal proceedings ==
Finton was indicted by a federal grand jury on October 8, 2009, for attempted murder and attempting to use a weapon of mass destruction against property owned and used by the US. On May 9, 2011, he pleaded guilty and was immediately sentenced to 28 years in prison. He was imprisoned at USP Florence High. On June 27, 2021, Finton was transferred to USP Big Sandy with BOP# 17031-026.

== See also ==
- Homegrown terrorism
