= United States Penitentiary, McCreary =

Federal prison in Kentucky, United States

Coordinates: 36°41′17″N 84°23′18″W

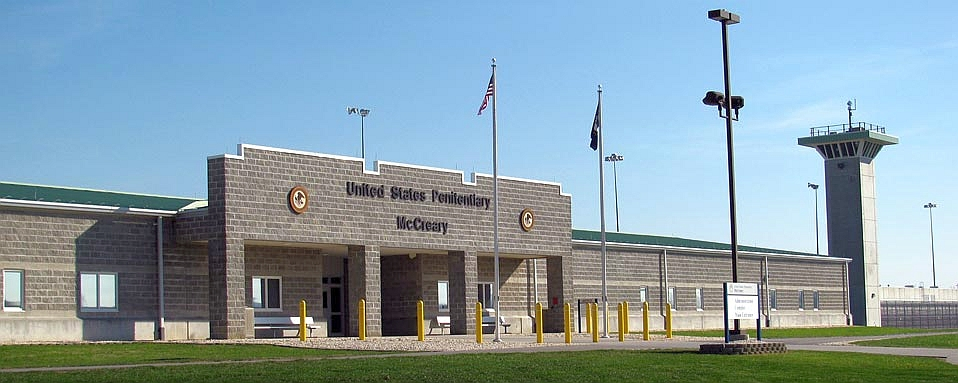
- Interactive map of United States Penitentiary, McCreary
- Location: McCreary County, near Pine Knot, Kentucky
- Status: Operational
- Security class: High-security (with minimum-security prison camp)
- Population: 1,632 [1,553 at the USP, 79 in prison camp] (September 2023)
- Opened: 2003
- Managed by: Federal Bureau of Prisons
- Warden: Christopher Gomez

The United States Penitentiary, McCreary (USP McCreary) is a high-security United States federal prison for male inmates in unincorporated McCreary County, Kentucky. It is operated by the Federal Bureau of Prisons, a division of the United States Department of Justice. The facility also has an adjacent minimum-security satellite camp for male offenders.

USP McCreary (the name comes from the surrounding Kentucky county, which has no incorporated towns) is located approximately 88 miles (142 km) north of Knoxville, Tennessee, 125 miles (201 km) south of Lexington, Kentucky, and 208 miles (335 km) south of Cincinnati, Ohio.

== Facility and programs ==
The Education Department at USP McCreary offers a wide variety of academic and vocational programs ranging from Adult Literacy to post-secondary studies through correspondence. All programs are voluntary with the exception of General Education Development (GED) and English as a Second Language (ESL) classes. A representative from the Education Department interviews each inmate shortly after their arrival at the institution to determine their educational needs and goals. An inmate who does not have a verifiable high school diploma or GED is required to attend 240 hours of GED classes. For inmates who cannot proficiently speak English, mandatory attendance in ESL classes is required until the inmate is able to pass a certification test.

== Notable incidents ==
Two correction officers at USP McCreary were stabbed on November 8, 2010. A prison spokesperson told The Associated Press that the officers were conducting routine cell searches when an inmate attacked them with a homemade prison knife. The officers were taken to a local hospital with what officials called serious but non-life-threatening injuries to the chest, back and shoulder. They were later released after treatment. An investigation identified the assailant as 38-year-old James Edward Rose, an inmate with a lengthy criminal history who was serving a sentence for armed bank robbery and witness tampering. Rose was convicted of attempted murder in 2011 and sentenced to life in prison. He is currently being held at the United States Penitentiary, Atwater.

On October 15, 2013, WBIR-TV, an NBC affiliate in Knoxville, reported that 350 federal employees, primarily correctional officers, were working without pay during the 2013 federal government shutdown. The story quoted Don Peace, an employee at USP McCreary and president of the American Federation of Government Employees local, "There are probably 1,700 inmates behind the wall. The staff is putting their life literally on the line every time they come to work and go behind that fence. You don't know if you're going to walk out at night or not and now they're asking us to do that for free or for an IOU. This job is already stressful enough without all of these added things we have no control over." While the correctional officers and other prison employees worked for free, the inmates continued receiving pay for their labor during the shutdown. The shutdown ended on October 17, 2013.

== Notable inmates ==
=== Organized crime figures ===
Inmate name	Register number	Status	Details
Corey Hamlet	27912-050	Transferred to USP Lee. Serving a life sentence.	Leader of the Grape Street Crips in Newark, NJ; Convicted of six homicides and ten attempted murders.
Ronell Wilson	71460-053	Transferred to USP Florence High. Serving a life sentence.	Gang leader in Staten Island, New York; murdered NYPD Detectives James Nemorin and Rodney Andrews, who were conducting a sting operation to buy an illegal gun in 2003.
Thomas Pitera	29465-053	Transferred to USP Big Sandy. Serving a life sentence.	Former hitman for the Bonanno Crime Family in New York City; convicted in 1992 of murder and murder conspiracy for torturing and murdering six people, as well as racketeering for operating a large drug trafficking operation.
Haji Bagcho	29820-016	Released on December 16, 2022.	Afghanistan national and drug trafficker. Convicted of conspiracy, distribution of heroin for importation into the United States and narco-terrorism. Bagcho also used a portion of his drug proceeds to fund Taliban governor of Nangarhar Province and two Taliban commanders responsible for insurgent activity in eastern Afghanistan with cash, weapons and other supplies so that they could continue their "jihad" against western troops and the Afghan government.
Gustavo Colon	07984-424	Serving a life sentence.	Major figure of the Latin Kings gang who was convicted of assisting with cocaine trafficking.
Gerald Rubalcaba	02552-748	Transferred to ADX Florence. Serving a life sentence.	One of the five highest-ranking members in the Nuestra Familia prison gang. He and 4 other "generals" were tried under the Racketeer Influenced Corrupt Organizations Act and sentenced to life imprisonment for overseeing a gang that distributed cocaine, heroin, marijuana, and methamphetamine within prison systems. Rubalcaba was transferred into USP McCreary from ADX Florence in July 2020.
Carl Mark Force	58633-037	Released on October 9, 2020.	Former DEA Agent convicted of money laundering, obstruction of justice, and "extortion under color of official right" during the investigation of the Silk Road online drug marketplace.
John DeRoss	10451-054	Transferred to FCI Cumberland and then to MCFP Springfield. Serving a life sentence.	Former Underboss of the Colombo crime family and perpetrator of the 1999 Cutolo murder, and the 1991 Campanella attempted murder.
Kenneth McGriff	26301-053	Transferred to USP Beaumont Serving a life sentence.	Founder of the Supreme Team, a violent gang which sold crack cocaine in Queens, NY. Convicted in 2007 of murder, racketeering, and drug trafficking.
Matthew Madonna	03789-158	Serving a life sentence.	Former acting boss of the Lucchese crime family, convicted in 2017 of racketeering, ordering the November 15, 2013 murder of East Harlem Purple Gang leader Michael Meldish.

=== Terrorists ===
Inmate name	Register number	Status	Details
Russell Defreitas	64347-053	Transferred to USP Coleman I. Serving a life sentence.	Convicted in 2010 for conspiracy to commit a terrorist attack at JFK Airport.
Ghassan Elashi	29687-177	Serving a 65-year sentence; scheduled for release on June 24, 2068.	Former Chairman of the Holy Land Foundation; convicted in 2008 of providing material support for terrorism charges for funneling money to the terrorist organization Hamas. Four co-conspirators were also convicted.
Ahmed Khalfan Ghailani	02476-748	Serving a life sentence.	Al-Qaeda terrorist convicted for his role in the bombing of embassies in Kenya and Tanzania. He was on the FBI Most Wanted Terrorists list from its inception in October 2001. In 2004, he was captured and detained by Pakistani forces in a joint operation with the United States, and was held until June 9, 2009, at Guantanamo Bay detention camp. He was then sentenced to life imprisonment in the United States and sent to ADX Florence, but then later transferred to USP McCreary.
Sami Osmakac	55958-018	Transferred to FMC Rochester. Serving a 40-year sentence; scheduled for release on April 29, 2046.	Convicted of one count of attempted use of a weapon of mass destruction, and one count of possession of an unregistered automatic firearm in connection with a terrorist plot

=== Other ===
Inmate name	Register number	Status	Details
Chevie Kehoe	21300-009	Transferred to USP Big Sandy. Serving three consecutive life sentences.	White supremacist convicted on charges of racketeering, racketeering in aid of murder and robbery conspiracy in connection to the kidnapping, torture and murders of William and Nancy Mueller and their 8-year-old daughter, Sarah Powell. Co-defendant Daniel Lewis Lee was executed for the murders at United States Penitentiary, Terre Haute on July 14, 2020. Transferred into USP Florence - High from ADX Florence in 2019, and subsequently to McCreary in December 2020.
Cristóbal Véliz	88389-054	Transferred to USP Atwater. Serving a life sentence.	Responsible for the Murders of Bernice and Ben Novack Jr. Now at USP Atwater.
Ricky Mungia	26372-077	Transferred to USP Pollock. Serving a life sentence.	White supremacist; convicted of civil rights violations for a shooting spree targeting African-Americans in Lubbock, Texas, which killed one man and wounded two others, in an attempt to start a nationwide race war. His co-defendants, Eli Mungia and Roy Martin are housed at USP Big Sandy and ADX Florence respectively.
Brendt Christensen	22127-026	Transferred to USP Coleman II. Serving a life sentence.	Kidnapped, raped, and murdered a Chinese student at the University of Illinois.
Scott Lee Kimball	14444-006	Transferred to USP Florence High. Serving a 70-year sentence; scheduled for release on January 7, 2082	Suspected of having committed additional murders. Convicted of attempted escape in 2020 after a prisoner he was plotting with three years earlier informed the FBI; transferred from state to federal custody in 2021 for unknown reasons.
Tim Durham	60452-112	Transferred to FCI Leavenworth. Serving a 50-year sentence; scheduled for release on September 21, 2054.	American lawyer and financier; convicted in 2012 of conspiracy to commit wire fraud and securities fraud for cheating his clients out of $200 million in a Ponzi scheme; his story was featured on the CNBC television show American Greed.
Christopher Jeburk	09029-021	Transferred to USP Allenwood. Serving a life sentence.	Bank robberies, kidnappings, jail and prisons escapes, case featured on TV show The FBI Files.
Auburn Calloway	14601-076	Transferred to USP Coleman I. Serving two consecutive life sentences.	Flight engineer, convicted of Attempted Aircraft Piracy Interference With Flight Crew Members and Attempted Terrorism in the attempted hijacking of a Federal Express McDonnell Douglas DC-10 flight from Memphis, Tennessee to San Jose, California. The flight crew managed to land the aircraft safely back at Memphis.
Richard McNair	13829-045	Serving two consecutive life sentences on a state murder charge from North Dakota in 1987.	Previously held at ADX due to multiple prison escapes until November 2022; escaped from the Ward County Jail in Minot, North Dakota in 1987, from the North Dakota State Penitentiary in Bismarck in 1992, and from USP Pollock in Louisiana in 2006.

== See also ==
- List of U.S. federal prisons
- Federal Bureau of Prisons
- Incarceration in the United States
