= Abdulrahman El Bahnasawy =

Canadian terrorism convict

- Born: 1998 (age 27–28); Kuwait
- Citizenship: Canadian
- Convictions: Conspiracy to use weapons of mass destruction (18 U.S. Code § 2332a) Conspiracy to commit terrorism transcending national boundaries (18 U.S. Code § 2332b) Conspiracy to bomb a place of public use and public transportation system (18 U.S. Code § 2332f) Conspiracy to provide material support to a designated terrorist organization (18 U.S.C. § 2339B)

Details
- Imprisoned at: ADX Florence

Abdulrahman El Bahnasawy (Arabic: عبد الرحمن البهنسي; born 1998) is a Kuwait-born Canadian citizen who was convicted in 2016 of terrorism-related offenses. According to prosecutors, El Bahnasawy plotted via online chat to carry out an attack on Times Square and the subway system in New York City. In December 2018, El Bahnasawy was sentenced to 40 years in a US federal prison. He later committed a violent attack on a prison guard in December 2020, later being sentenced to an additional 50 years.

== Early life ==
El Bahnasawy was born in Kuwait. Throughout El Bahnsawy's adolescent life, he struggled with issues related to his mental illness and subsequent substance abuse. El Bahnsawy had a significant history of mental health difficulties prior to his arrest. From age 14 El Bahnsawy was placed as an inpatient in three different mental health hospitals, including Egypt, Kuwaiti Center of Psychiatric Health and the Centre for Addiction and Mental Health (CAMH) in Toronto, Ontario. El Bahnasawy was a 17-year-old minor with no history of violence or criminal record prior to making contact with an undercover FBI informant to plot terror attacks in New York City.

== Terror plot and arrest ==
El Bahnasawy began communicating on message boards in support of the Islamic State of Iraq and al-Sham (ISIS), a designated foreign terrorist organization. He conspired with Talha Haroon, a 20-year-old U.S. citizen residing in Pakistan, and Russell Salic, a 38-year-old Philippines citizen and resident, to conduct bombings and shootings in heavily populated areas of New York City during the Islamic holy month of Ramadhan in 2016, all in the name of ISIS. El Bahnasawy purchased bomb-making materials for the attack and rented out a cabin that was driving distance from New York City to build the bombs for the attack. His lawyer later said that these activities were encouraged and guided by an undercover agent. Haroon allegedly made plans to travel from Pakistan to New York City to join El Bahnasawy in carrying out the attacks. As El Bahnasawy and Haroon prepared to execute the attacks, Salic allegedly wired money from the Philippines to the United States to help fund the terrorist operation.

The group was infiltrated by an undercover informant for the Federal Bureau of Investigation (FBI) . While on a family trip in May 2016, El Bahnasawy was arrested by federal agents in New Jersey; he was charged with conspiracy to commit terror acts transcending national borders and providing material support to terror groups. Haroon and Salic were arrested in Pakistan and the Philippines, respectively. In 2020, a Pakistani Supreme Court decided to halt the United States extradition request of Haroon. Salic remains in Filipino custody as of 2024. El Bahnasawy's lawyer alleges he was entrapped by the FBI with the help of RCMP, stating they were aware of his mental illness but did not contact his family, and in late 2019, a complaint was filed with Canada's National Security and Intelligence Review Agency. The lawyer claimed the undercover agent exchanged "inflammatory messages" with El Bahnasawy, as communications showed the Canadian was "influenced by the informant who contributed to Mr. El Bahnasawy's radicalization," the defence said. Additionally, none of the plans were carried out.

On December 19, 2018, El Bahnasawy was sentenced to 40 years in federal prison. The prosecution on the case had pushed for El Bahnasawy to be sentenced to life imprisonment. El Bahnasawy's mother yelled "This is a sick boy! This is crazy. You have no justice," before being ushered out of the courtroom.

== Court recommendations ==
A number of recommendations were made to the Bureau of Prisons (BOP) on where to house El Bahnasawy. The court recommended that El Bahnasawy be designated to FCI Butner Medium (care level 3), FCI McKean, or FCI Schuylkill (care level 2) to facilitate greater proximity to mental health services. Despite the court's recommendations, El Bahnasawy was placed in the Segregated Housing Unit (SHU) of USP Big Sandy before being transferred to the general population of USP Allenwood.

== RCMP involvement and ongoing review ==
El Bahnasawy’s legal team alleged that both the RCMP and FBI were aware of his mental health condition, making him vulnerable to entrapment. According to court documents, the RCMP shared his medical information with the FBI during the investigation. In July 2024, CBC reported that Canada’s National Security and Intelligence Review Agency (NSIRA) found no evidence of entrapment by the RCMP but noted that the agency’s review remained incomplete, as the RCMP withheld key documents and communications during the investigation. Following this, a Canadian court ordered the RCMP to disclose all requested documentation to allow the review to proceed.

== Prison attack ==
On December 7, 2020, at around 6:15 am, while incarcerated at USP Allenwood, El Bahnasawy snuck behind corrections officer Dale Franquet Jr and stabbed him twice in the back and eye with a 14-inch shank. Franquet lost his eye in the attack. El Bahnasawy was quickly transferred to USP Lewisburg. In April 2021, El Bahnasawy was transferred to ADX Florence.

Prior to the incident, El Bahnasawy’s parents had urged the Federal Bureau of Prisons to provide mental health treatment and medication for their son, according to a court filing cited by his attorney. Court proceedings later included competency evaluations, and a forensic psychiatric report referenced in court filings concluded that El Bahnasawy was experiencing a psychotic episode at the time of the incident.

On October 20, 2022, El Bahnasawy pled no contest to charges of two counts of assault on a federal officer. In addition he was also charged with two counts of assault with intent to commit murder, assault with a deadly weapon, possession of a prohibited object, and providing material support or resources to a foreign terrorist organization. According to his attorney, Andrew J. Frisch, El Bahnasawy potentially faces an additional 40 years in prison.

On November 4, 2025, El Bahnasawy pled guilty to multiple counts of assault, assault with intent to commit murder and possession of contraband inside a prison, as well as providing material support to ISIS, a designated foreign terrorist organization.

On October 19, 2026, El Bahnasawy was sentenced to 50 years in prison for the attack, to run consecutively with his 40 years, increasing his overall sentence to 90 years in prison.
