= United States Penitentiary, Florence High =

United States federal prison in Colorado

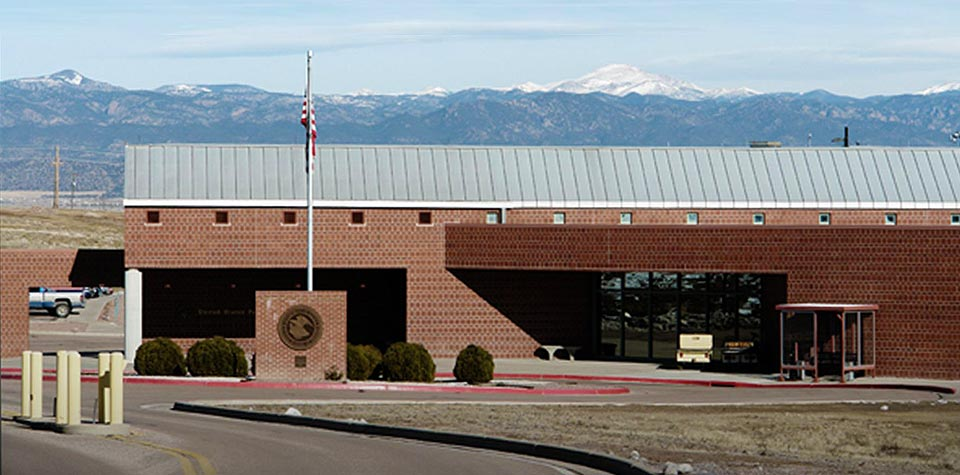
- Interactive map of United States Penitentiary, Florence High
- Location: Fremont County, near Florence, Colorado; 38°21′42″N 105°05′45″W
- Status: Operational
- Security class: High
- Population: 971 (September 2023)
- Opened: 1993
- Managed by: Federal Bureau of Prisons
- Website: Official website

The United States Penitentiary, Florence High (USP Florence High) is a high-security United States federal prison located near Florence, Colorado, and designed to house male inmates. It is operated by the Federal Bureau of Prisons, a division of the United States Department of Justice. USP Florence High is part of the Federal Correctional Complex, Florence (FCC Florence), which is situated on 49 acres (20 ha) of land and houses different facilities with varying degrees of security. It is named Florence High in order to differentiate it from the United States Penitentiary, Florence ADMAX, the federal supermax prison located in the same complex.

FCC Florence is located in unincorporated Fremont County, Colorado, 90 mi (145 km) south of Denver.

== History ==
USP Florence High was built in 1993 in response to the growing need for a place to house high-security federal inmates. It was designed by DLR Group, an architectural firm specializing in correctional facilities. Before the complex was built, the city of Florence was experiencing an economic crisis with an unemployment rate of 17%. When the citizens were polled by mail about building the complex in Florence, 97% of respondents were in favor of the project. It was estimated that the Florence Federal Correctional Complex was going to provide about 1,000 temporary jobs and 900 permanent jobs. In anticipation of these jobs the community raised $160,000 to purchase the 600 acres (240 ha) needed to build the prisons.

== Facility ==
USP Florence High housed 816 male inmates as of December 2019, and is about 390,020 sq ft (36,234 m^{2}). A perimeter fence, seven guard towers, and a patrol road ensure the security of the prison. The prison includes health services, educational program areas, visitation, laundry, a barbershop, commissary, chapel, Special Housing Unit (SHU), and an exercise area.

The prison also contains a step-down unit for inmates of ADX Florence. Inmates will still spend roughly 22 hours of their day in their cells; however, they are kept in a less restrictive environment in which interaction among inmates is acceptable and encouraged. From there, they will either be transferred to the general population unit in Florence High or to a different federal prison.

== Notable incidents ==
In 2000, seven federal correctional officers whom the union called "The Cowboys" were charged with committing misconduct which occurred between January 1995 and July 1997, which included beating and choking handcuffed inmates, mixing waste into the inmates' food, and threatening other officers who objected to their actions. The case went to trial in 2003, and three of the officers, Mike Lavallee, Rod Schultz, and Robert Verbickas, were convicted of violating the civil rights of inmate Pedro Castillo by beating him while he was in restraints. Lavallee and Schultz were also convicted of engaging in a conspiracy to commit civil rights violations. All three were sentenced to prison terms.

=== 1999 inmate murder ===
On October 10, 1999, inmates William Concepcion Sablan and Rudy Cabrera Sablan were accused of the murder of fellow inmate Joey Jesus Estrella. The three inmates were seen drinking hooch together, and they were heard fighting throughout the night. Both William and Rudy Sablan were found with the disembowled corpse of Estrella in their cell the next morning. Prosecutors intended to seek the death penalty against both William and Rudy Sablan, who are cousins; however, due to William Sablan's extensive record of mental illness and brain damage, they were both given life sentences for the murder and moved into ADX Florence. As of December 2025, William Sablan was being incarcerated at USP Allenwood and Rudy Sablan at ADX Florence.

=== 2008 inmate murder ===
In 2008, inmate Gary Douglas Watland, who was serving a combined 55-year state sentence for the murder of a friend and attempting to escape the Maine State Prison, was accused of killing fellow inmate Mark Baker, a member of the Nazi Lowriders gang. Watland sneaked up on Baker while he was playing poker and stabbed him in the neck with a homemade knife. Watland stated the attack was a kill or be killed situation, as he had recently come out of the closet in prison. Baker's gang was known to attack homosexuals in prison. Watland subsequently accepted a plea deal and was sentenced to life imprisonment. As of January 2021, he was serving his sentence at ADX Florence.

=== 2008 inmate riot ===
On April 20, 2008, a 30-minute riot occurred between a large number of inmates in the recreation yard, during which several inmates were stabbed with homemade knives known as shanks" Correction officers who were posted on watch towers shot and killed two of the armed inmates. The incident began after white supremacist prisoners celebrating Adolf Hitler's birthday began yelling racial epithets at black prisoners. The white supremacists were drinking hooch, a form of homemade wine, and were armed with rocks and improvised weapons. Approximately 200 prisoners were involved in the melee.

=== 2021 inmate murder ===
On December 6, 2021, inmate Jamarr Thompson, 33, was killed after he was involved in an altercation with another inmate. Thompson was serving a 63-month sentence for an attempted bank robbery. This was the third murder in a Federal Bureau of Prisons (BOP) institution in the past one month, the other two occurring at USP Canaan and USP Tucson, respectively. This incident heightened concerns about the rising level of violence within BOP prisons. It also intensified chairman of the Senate Judiciary Committee, Senator Dick Durbin's request to the Attorney General to fire BOP chairman Michael Carvajal, citing failure to respond adequately to rising levels of violence within federal prisons and corruption among BOP staff.

== Notable inmates (current and former) ==
=== Foreign terrorists ===
Inmate name	Register number	Photo	Status	Details
Sayfullo Saipov	79715-054		Transferred to ADX Florence. Serving ten life sentences plus 260 years.	Perpetrator of the 2017 New York City truck attack, in which he drove a pickup truck rented from Home Depot through the protected bike lane of Hudson River Park in Manhattan, killing eight people and injuring eleven others. The incident was considered the deadliest terrorist attack in New York City since the September 11 attacks of 2001.
Khalfan Mohamed	44623-054		Transferred to USP Canaan. Serving a life sentence.	An Al-Qaeda operative from Tanzania; convicted in connection with the 1998 United States embassy bombings in Kenya and Tanzania, Africa, which were conceived by Al-Qaeda leader Osama bin Laden; the bombings killed 224 people and injured more than 4,000.
Khalid al-Fawwaz	67497-054		Transferred to USP Victorville. Serving a life sentence.	An Al-Qaeda operative from Saudi Arabia; convicted in connection with the 1998 United States embassy bombings in Kenya and Tanzania, Africa, which were conceived by Al-Qaeda leader Osama bin Laden; the bombings killed 224 people and injured more than 4,000. Moved into USP Florence - High from adjacent ADX in January 2022.
Shain Duka	61284-066		Transferred to USP Atwater. Serving a life sentence plus 30 years.	Convicted in 2008 for conspiring to kill members of the Army at the Fort Dix, New Jersey, army base. His two brothers were also convicted: Eljvir Duka, who is being held at USP Hazelton and Dritan Duka, who is being held at FCI Terre Haute.
El Shafee Elsheikh	11698-509		Transferred to ADX Florence. Serving eight concurrent life sentences.	Elsheikh was given 8 life sentences without the possibility of parole in August 2022 for charges of conspiracy to commit murder, lethal hostage taking, and material support. These charges stemmed from participating in the beheadings of four Americans while an active member of the Islamic State. Elsheikh was one of the four British members of what was known as the "ISIS Beatles". Another member of this group, Alexanda Kotey was also given eight concurrent life sentences in federal court. Initially having been incarcerated at USP Canaan, he too was moved to ADX Florence.
Ahmed Ressam	29638-086		Transferred to ADX Florence. Serving a 37-year sentence; scheduled for release on July 1, 2032.	Algerian national convicted in 2001 of terrorism conspiracy for planning to bomb Los Angeles International Airport on December 31, 1999, in what is known as one of the 2000 millennium attack plots.
Mohamed al-Owhali	42371–054		Transferred to USP Big Sandy. Serving a life sentence.	British-born Saudi terrorist who is one of four individuals convicted in connection with the 1998 United States embassy bombings.

=== Domestic terrorists ===
This list contains U.S. citizens, regardless of origin, who committed or attempted to commit terrorist attacks against United States citizens and interests.

Inmate name	Register number	Photo	Status	Details
Naser Jason Abdo	80882-280		Transferred to ADX Florence. Serving two consecutive life sentences plus 60 years.	U.S. Army private who refused to deploy to Afghanistan and went AWOL; convicted in 2012 of attempted use of a weapon of mass destruction for plotting to detonate a bomb in 2011 at a restaurant near Fort Hood in Killeen, Texas, when it was filled with soldiers. Transferred into Florence High from ADX Florence in May 2021 but was sent back to ADX in June 2021 .
Dzhokhar Tsarnaev	95079-038		Transferred to ADX Florence. Originally sentenced to death on June 24, 2015. Sentence overturned by a federal appeals court on July 31, 2020, but re-imposed by Supreme Court on March 4, 2022.	Dzhokhar planted a pressure cooker bomb at the finish line of the 2013 Boston Marathon, killing three people and injuring over 250. He was sentenced to death. On June 25, 2015, Tsarnaev was transferred to the USP Florence High; as of July 17, 2015 he had been transferred to ADX Florence. He was to be transferred to USP Terre Haute in Indiana when his execution date was set, but the death sentence was vacated in July 2020 due to inadequate screening for potential biases among jury pool. The death sentence was re-imposed by the Supreme Court of the United States on March 4, 2022.
Michael Finton	17031-026		Transferred to FCI Bennettsville. Serving a 28-year sentence, scheduled for release on January 11, 2034.	Convicted for attempt to murder, with malice aforethought, at least one US federal officer and employee and an attempt to use a weapon of mass destruction against property owned by the US.
Harlem Suarez	06262-104		Serving a life sentence.	ISIS sympathizer; charged on July 28, 2015, with attempting to use a weapon of mass destruction for planning to detonate a backpack bomb on a public beach in Key West, Florida.
Adam Dean Fox	11843-509		Transferred to ADX Florence. Serving a 16-year sentence; scheduled for release on May 26, 2034.	Designer and ring-leader of the Gretchen Whitmer kidnapping plot, a plot to overthrow the state government of Michigan beginning with the kidnapping of Michigan Governor Gretchen Whitmer. Fox and his co-defendants are all associated with the far-right or militia groups.

=== Organized crime figures ===
Inmate name	Register number	Photo	Status	Details.
Arturo Gallegos Castrellon	86139-080		Transferred to ADX Florence. Serving a life sentence.	Leader of the Barrio Azteca, ordered the murder of two U.S. consulate employees. Gallegos targeted the American officials because he believed they had given visas to members of a rival gang.
Dario Antonio Úsuga	99420-509		Transferred to ADX Florence. Serving a 45-year sentence under his misspelled name Dairo; scheduled for release on February 27, 2060.	Former leader of the Golf Clan, he was one of the most wanted drug lords in Colombia before he was captured on October 23, 2021, and later extradited to the United States in May 2022. He was convicted of drug trafficking and sentenced to 45 years in prison, in addition to being fined $216 million. US Attorney General Merrick Garland said Úsuga "ordered the reckless execution of Colombian police officers, soldiers, and civilians" during his time as leader of the Golf Clan.
Ronald Herron "Ra Diggs"	78527-053		Serving 12 consecutive life sentences plus 105 years.	One-time Brooklyn rapper, Ronald Herron AKA Ra Diggs was tried and convicted in 2014 for 21 counts, including three murders, racketeering and drug trafficking in connection to running a violent drug gang in New York.
Omar Portee	30063-037		Transferred to ADX Florence. Serving a 50-year sentence; scheduled for release on May 23, 2044.	Founder of the United Blood Nation gang; convicted in 2002 of racketeering and murder conspiracy, as well as narcotics and weapons charges.
Fotios "Freddy" Geas	05244-748		Transferred to ADX Florence. Serving a life sentence.	Massachusetts mobster and hitman. Suspect in Bulger death.
Monzer al-Kassar	61111-054		Transferred to FCI Florence. Serving a 30-year sentence; scheduled for release on December 28, 2032.	In 2009, sentenced to 30 years in prison for conspiring to sell weapons to Colombian rebels.
Perry Roark	53975-037		Transferred to USP Canaan. Serving a life sentence.	One of the founders of the Dead Man Incorporated prison gang. In 2013, Roark pleaded guilty to a racketeering conspiracy, murder and trafficking charges related to running the gang alongside members Bryan Jordan and James Sweeney. Roark and Sweeney were subsequently sentenced to life in prison. Both Sweeney and Roark were serving their life terms at ADX Florence until Roark was transferred to Florence High in 2019.
Tex Hernandez	02536-748		Transferred to MCFP Springfield. Serving a life sentence.	Leader of the Nuestra Familia, convicted of racketeering for controlling the gang from the Security Housing Unit at Pelican Bay State Prison; found guilty due to Operation Black Widow, a federal investigation.
Ross Ulbricht	18870-111		Transferred to USP Tucson, then released by President Trump on January 21, 2025, after serving two consecutive life sentences plus 40 years.	Convicted in 2015 for operating the Silk Road marketplace web site.
Ronell Wilson	71460-053		Transferred to USP Coleman. Serving a life sentence.	Gang leader in Staten Island, New York; murdered NYPD Detectives James Nemorin and Rodney Andrews, who were conducting a sting operation to buy an illegal gun in 2003.
Vincent Basciano	30694-054		Briefly incarcerated at Florence High in 2015. Returned as of 2026	Former Acting Boss of the Bonnano Crime Family. Serving two life sentences for murder and racketeering

=== Other ===
Inmate name	Register number	Photo	Status	Details
Gary Ridgway	02072-122		Transferred to Washington State Penitentiary in 2015. Serving 49 consecutive life sentences plus 480 years.	Known as the Green River Killer, Ridgway committed murder, rape and necrophilia in the Seattle and Tacoma area. Ridgway spent May 2015 to October 2015 in USP Florence. In 2015, he was transferred back to Washington State Penitentiary in Walla Walla.
Richard McNair	13829-045		Transferred to USP McCreary as of November 3, 2023. Serving two consecutive life sentences on a state murder charge from North Dakota in 1987.	Previously held at ADX due to multiple prison escapes until November 2022; escaped from the Ward County Jail in Minot, North Dakota in 1988, from the North Dakota State Penitentiary in Bismarck in 1992, and from USP Pollock in Louisiana in 2006.
Auburn Calloway	14601-076		Transferred to USP McCreary. Serving two consecutive life sentences.	Hijacker of Federal Express Flight 705 in 1994.
Chevie Kehoe	21300-009		Transferred to USP Terre Haute. Serving a life sentence.	White supremacist convicted on charges of racketeering, racketeering in aid of murder and robbery conspiracy in connection to the kidnapping, torture and murders of William and Nancy Mueller and their 8-year-old daughter, Sarah Powell. Co-defendant Daniel Lewis Lee was executed for the murders at United States Penitentiary, Terre Haute on July 14, 2020. Transferred into Florence High from ADX Florence in 2019.
Chimene Hamilton Onyeri	79217-380		Serving a life sentence.	Attempted assassination of Travis County, Texas, district judge Julie Kocurek after she previously sentenced him for running a tax refund scam. Transferred here from USP Pollock.
Scott Lee Kimball	14444-006		Transferred to USP Coleman II. Serving a 70-year sentence; scheduled for release on January 7, 2082.	Serial killer sentenced to 70 years in Colorado state prison in 2009 for financial crimes and four murders committed while he was an FBI informant. Suspected of having committed additional murders. Convicted of attempted escape in 2020 after a prisoner he was plotting with three years earlier informed the FBI; transferred from state to federal custody in 2021 for unknown reasons.
Dominick Maldonado	02071-122		Transferred to ADX Florence. Serving a 163-year state sentence.	Perpetrator of the 2005 Tacoma Mall shooting, as well as keeping four people hostage at gunpoint at a Sam Goody store. Transferred here for a short period of time, but returned to ADX in May 2023.
Patrick Franklin Andrews	12550-007		Transferred to USP Beaumont. Serving a life sentence.	Criminal who murdered two people (in 1997 and 2000) and later killed a fellow inmate at USP Hazelton in 2007. Received another sentence of life imprisonment in 2015 and was transferred to Florence High.
John Travis Millner	32011-007		Transferred to USP Coleman I. Serving a life sentence.	Sentenced to life for murdering someone by shooting them with a high-powered rifle. In 2009, he stabbed a fellow prisoner with a prison-made icepick before strangling him to death.
Xaviar Michael Babudar	69098-510		Serving a 17.5-year federal sentence; scheduled for release on May 9, 2038.	Serial bank robber who first came to prominence as a notable superfan of the NFL's Kansas City Chiefs. Babudar was convicted for the robbery of more than $800,000 through robberies in several states, as well as the use of casinos to launder money. In September 2024, he was sentenced to 17.5 years in prison. He will be transferred to state custody in Oklahoma following the end of his federal sentence, to serve an additional 14.5 years.
Kevin Perez	45770-510		Serving a 30-year sentence, scheduled for release on August 12, 2047.	American drill-rapper known as Kay Flock. Perez was arrested in December 2021 on federal attempted murder and racketeering charges. On December 16, 2025, he was sentenced to 30 years in prison.

== See also ==
- List of U.S. federal prisons
- Federal Bureau of Prisons
- Incarceration in the United States
