= Mohammed Odeh =

Member of al-Qaeda

Mohammed Saddiq Odeh
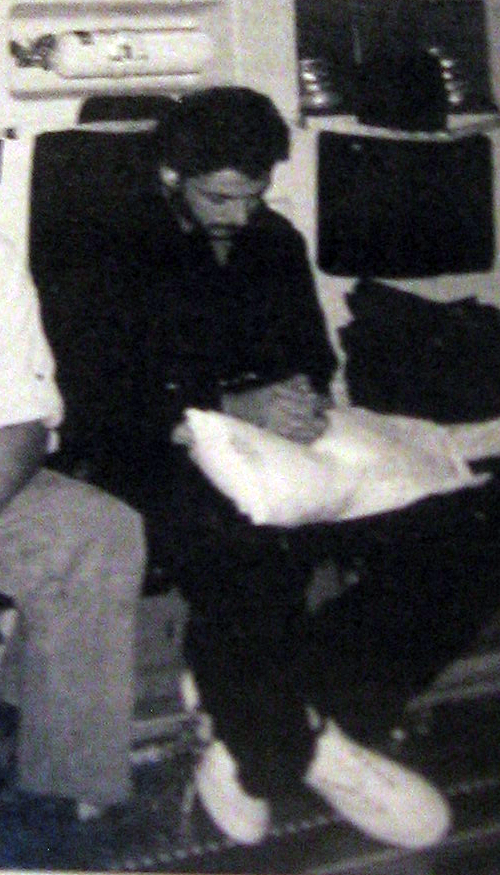
- Odeh in 1998
- Born: Mohammed Saddiq Odeh; 1 March 1965 (age 61); Tabuk, Saudi Arabia
- Arrested: 1998; Karachi, Pakistan; Inter-Services Intelligence and FBI
- Citizenship: Jordanian and Kenyan
- Detained at: United States Penitentiary, Coleman I, Florida
- Other name: Khalid Salim
- ISN: 42375-054
- Alleged to be a member of: al-Qaeda
- Charge: 1998 US embassy attacks
- Penalty: life imprisonment (2001)
- Status: in prison
- Spouse: Nassem Nassor, born August 15, 1969
- Children: 1

Mohammed Saddiq Odeh (born 1 March 1965) is a Saudi-born al-Qaeda member, sentenced in October 2001 to life imprisonment for his parts in the US embassy bombings in Kenya and Tanzania on August 7, 1998. Odeh was convicted along with three co-conspirators: Mohamed Rashed Daoud Al-Owhali, Khalfan Khamis Mohamed and Wadih el Hage. Another defendant, Ali Mohamed, pleaded guilty the previous year. Another, Mamdouh Mahmud Salim, was awaiting trial, and three additional defendants were fighting extradition in England.

He is currently imprisoned in the United States Penitentiary in Coleman, Florida.

== Activities ==
In March 1993, Saif al-Adel ordered Odeh to Somalia to train tribes in fighting. He has been accused of training forces loyal to warlord Mohamed Farrah Aidid in 1993, while other sources have suggested he was training Al-Itihaad al-Islamiya members. The following year he was sent to Mombasa, Kenya with money from Mohammed Atef to purchase himself a 7-tonne trawler and start a fishing business.

An engineer with both Kenyan and Jordanian citizenship, Odeh was arrested in Karachi, Pakistan after a flight from Nairobi to Karachi using a forged Yemeni passport, with a photograph that clearly did not match his face, supplied to him by Abdullah Ahmed Abdullah. Odeh was interrogated by Pakistan’s ISI agents because he listed his flight destination as "Afghanistan", and he confessed to his role in the bombings, claiming that seven men had plotted them together.

A week later he was returned to Nairobi, where he was taken into custody by the FBI. The FBI interrogated him from 15–27 August 1998, and FBI's Special Agent Daniel Coleman confirmed that he had accepted responsibility for the bombing.
