= Scott Lee Kimball =

American serial killer (born 1966)

- Incarceration mugshot c. 2017
- Born: September 21, 1966 (age 60); Boulder, Colorado, U.S.
- Other names: Joe Snitch; Hannibal
- Convictions: Second degree murder (4 counts); Fraud; Forgery; Fraud; Felon in possession of a firearm; Attempted escape
- Penalty: 70 years imprisonment

Details
- Victims: 4+
- Span of crimes: 2003–2004
- Country: United States
- States: Colorado; Utah
- Date apprehended: March 14, 2006
- Imprisoned at: United States Penitentiary, Florence High

Scott Lee Kimball (born September 21, 1966) is a convicted serial killer, con man and fraudster from Boulder County, Colorado, who murdered at least four people over a two-year period; investigators strongly suspect him in as many as 21 other unsolved killings. For the first year of his murder activity, he worked as an informant for the FBI, which both paid him and protected him from facing justice over some of his fraud schemes. Almost none of the information he gave the bureau was of any use in prosecuting other crimes, and much of it later proved false; the case greatly embarrassed the bureau. The agent who oversaw him during this period was disciplined; he insists he was not the only one responsible for enabling Kimball.

Kimball was sexually abused in his teens, which led to a suicide attempt. He is a skilled forger who, while he ran a legitimate business buying and selling organic beef, primarily enriched himself by passing bad checks on the accounts of others and using forged documents; by 2003 he had faced criminal charges in four Western states. These white-collar crimes also enabled his murders, by allowing him to create evidence that his victims were still alive after he had killed them; he also used their bank accounts and credit cards to further his schemes once they were dead.

Two of Kimball's victims were people close to him: the daughter of his third wife, and his own uncle. His second wife, who bore his two sons, claims he twice kidnapped and raped her; there was an open arrest warrant for him from the second assault, which occurred after he absconded from work release, at the time the FBI hired him as an informant. Members of Kimball's family and some investigators believe that a 2004 motor vehicle accident which severely injured his oldest son was in fact an attempt to kill the boy for insurance money; charges were never brought, due to conflicts between the jurisdictions where it could have been prosecuted.

An investigation into a 2006 check fraud scheme eventually led law enforcement to discover the murders. Kimball, having violated the terms of his plea agreement when he could not lead police to the still-missing body of one of the four victims, faced murder charges in all four cases, in addition to the fraud charges that had prompted the investigation. Three of the missing murder victims had been found in remote areas of Colorado and neighboring Utah. Under Colorado laws which quadruple sentences for those found to be habitual offenders, he was sentenced to a combined 70 years for the frauds and the murders after pleading guilty. While in state prison, he additionally pleaded guilty to a charge of attempted escape. He is currently serving his sentence in federal prison, at the United States Penitentiary, Florence High in Colorado, a high-security facility immediately adjacent to ADX Florence.

== Early life ==
Kimball was born in Boulder, Colorado, in 1966. When he was 10 his mother, Barb, came out as a lesbian, leading to his parents' divorce; his father, Virgil, left the state and remarried. Kimball was strongly affected by the divorce. In his early adolescence he had his first encounter with law enforcement when police were called to the house after he fired a gun out the window at neighboring houses.

Kimball and his younger brother Brett took refuge at their grandmother's mobile home. A neighbor of hers, Theodore Peyton, took advantage of their situation and began sexually abusing both of them at a cabin he owned in Nederland, Colorado. Peyton's abuse progressed from having Kimball touch him and photographing the boy naked to tying Kimball up and raping him, recording the episode on film. Peyton threatened to kill his father, who lived in Montana, if he told anyone. Peyton continued abusing Kimball when Kimball would return to Boulder on weekends, after he had moved to Hamilton, Montana to attend high school and live with his father and brother.

The abuse ended when Kimball was 23 and shot himself in the head in a suicide attempt. The bullet glanced off his skull, but the wound, which left a visible scar on his forehead, was severe enough that he was in critical condition for several days. A cousin, Ed Coet, remarked that Kimball came out of the experience changed, as if he had "lost his conscience".

Afterwards, Kimball and several other boys whom Peyton had molested reported him to Boulder police. Peyton was arrested, convicted of seven counts of sexually assaulting a child, and imprisoned. Kimball continued to feel a deep sense of shame, "less of a man" for it, according to a former girlfriend.

Kimball wrote a letter to the judge, begging him to sentence Peyton to additional prison time, stating, "[he has] denied me my right to a normal, healthy innocent childhood. [H]e has damaged my life forever." When asked about the abuse and its effect on Kimball in 2010, Peyton said only "that was a long time ago."

== Criminal career ==
Kimball had already turned to nonviolent crime, usually fraud. At the age of 22 he was convicted of passing bad checks, his first felony, in Montana. Back in Colorado, he burglarized houses. Montana also charged him with running an illegal hunting outfitting business.

After a brief first marriage failed, Kimball married Larissa Hentz in 1993 and moved with her to Spokane, Washington, where they had two sons before divorcing in 1997. She recalls that process servers were frequent visitors to their house, as Kimball was running scams in the logging industry, and those who partnered with him and were cheated would often use legal means to recover their money. "He always had an excuse", Hentz recalls. "It was never his fault". Among those Kimball victimized in his schemes were her dentists and the bishops at her church.

Their relationship continued for another two years after the divorce, ending when Hentz accused him of rape. Kimball told police she was trying to secure full custody of their sons, and after she failed a lie detector test, no charges were filed. Prosecutors also saw the case as "complicated", since the couple had continued to have consensual sex after the incident.

The following year, 2000, Kimball's violation of probation for an earlier fraud conviction revoked his earlier suspended sentence and put him back in prison in Montana. A year later, he absconded from a halfway house and stole a truck, along with the till from his employer, a gas station, where he was on work release. Hentz reported that, shortly afterward, he returned to Spokane, where he broke into her house, kidnapped her, and raped her again. She filed charges, and an arrest warrant was issued.

== Cooperation with FBI ==
Kimball fled to Alaska, where he posed as his brother, got engaged to another woman, and resumed his career in check fraud, writing $25,000 in forged checks. He was again arrested and convicted. In federal prison, he convinced FBI agents that he would work for them as an informant, and he was never brought to trial on the Spokane charges. The FBI denies this resulted from any intervention on its part. The agent who handled Kimball in Alaska says he never knew about those charges.

Kimball told the FBI that a fellow inmate, Arnold Flowers, was planning to have the federal judge and prosecutor in his case, along with a witness who had testified in the fraud case against him, killed. With his help and that of an undercover agent, the bureau recorded Flowers and his girlfriend making the arrangements with persons whom they believed to be the killers. They were arrested on several felony charges in March 2002.

Kimball told the FBI he could help them with more cases. Another fellow inmate, he said, had boasted of having killed another federal prosecutor, Thomas Wales, in his Seattle-area home the year before. For his safety, Kimball was transferred to the low-security Englewood federal prison in Littleton, Colorado. He discreetly let it be known that he had information about planned crimes that FBI agents might want to know about, and soon the bureau's liaison to the prison, Carle Schlaff, came to visit him. Kimball told Schlaff that fellow convict Steve Ennis, whom he had befriended, was allegedly plotting to kill witnesses expected to testify in an important trial about Ennis's ecstasy distribution ring.

Schlaff had resented being assigned to Englewood after earlier working on organized crime investigations. He considered the work more suited to a less experienced agent. In Kimball he saw the possibility for breaking the kind of case that could put him back on the career path he had been hoping for. He viewed Kimball as someone who, while he "had an answer for everything", was not a violent man and could still earn the trust of a jury as a witness. Due to Kimball's earlier service as an informant, there was still nothing in his file about the rape and kidnapping charges.

In March 2003, shortly after Jennifer Marcum, the first of four people Kimball later admitted killing, disappeared, he pleaded guilty in a Colorado federal court to the Alaska fraud charges. The prosecution and defense agreed that the records would be sealed to protect Kimball's work as an informant, an agreement signed off on by John Suthers, U.S. Attorney for Colorado. The following day, the FBI flew him to Seattle for a monitored conversation with the man he had identified to Schlaff as Wales's killer. However, the conversation yielded no useful information, as Kimball did not say what the FBI had wanted him to do, and it seemed as if the man barely knew him. Afterwards, Kimball failed a lie detector test in which he was asked if the man had confessed the Wales killing to him. Federal prosecutors later told Schlaff they were putting the Ennis case on hold.

When Schlaff drove Kimball to the airport the following month for a flight to Alaska to consult with prosecutors on the Flowers case, he noticed Kimball seemed less relaxed than usual. When Schlaff later checked Kimball's online file at the FBI office, he saw a new warrant from Spokane that did not specify a charge. Angry at not just Kimball but the prosecutors in the Ennis case and the Seattle agents who had doubted Kimball's reliability, Schlaff decided to end Kimball's service as an informant.

Schlaff had Denver police arrest Kimball upon his return from Alaska. The Spokane charge turned out to be a minor violation of his probation there related to his reporting of his address. Just after Schlaff told him he would no longer be an informant, Kimball told him he had information in the Jennifer Marcum disappearance, which, he later explained, was evidence that Ennis's partner had killed Marcum and told him about it in detail.

A DEA investigator on the case was not sure Kimball was telling the truth, but he passed a lie detector test this time. At Kimball's sentencing in December, prosecutors told the judge that he might yet be able to help the bureau solve that case, and asked for the lightest sentence possible. Kimball was fined $5,000 and ordered to pay almost $8,300 in restitution to the Wells Fargo bank branch in Cordova, Alaska. Judge Marcia Krieger sentenced him to three months in prison, which was more than accounted for by the time Kimball served. He was also put on probation for three years, ending his formal service as an FBI informant, although he could still work with the bureau voluntarily.

== Murders ==
Following his 2002 release on $10,000 bond, Kimball moved in with his mother and her partner near Denver, Colorado. He began to make money by flipping houses and set up an organic beef distribution company with $65,000 from his mother and brother. This enterprise required him to frequently travel around the state to ranches and cattle auctions in order to buy product. His ex-wife had also returned to Colorado. She still feared him but she let him see his sons.

Over the next two years, Kimball killed at least four people that he has confessed to. Three of them occurred while he was officially an FBI informant. Two of them were the girlfriends of Englewood inmates whom he befriended after his release. Another was his stepdaughter. The sole male victim was his uncle. He also allegedly attempted to kill his son, but no charges were filed in the incident due to arguments over jurisdiction. The body of his second victim, Jennifer Marcum, has not been found.

=== LeAnn Emry ===
At one of their early meetings, Kimball told Schlaff that Steve Holley, another inmate he knew at Englewood, serving time for bank robbery, who had a history of escaping, was planning another attempt. Schlaff notified the prison, which put the man in solitary confinement. Kimball had actually initiated the plan, under which he would, once free, drive his truck to the prison wall, have others create a diversion, throw a ladder over the wall which Holley would climb, and then the two would drive to Mexico. As part of the plan, Holley directed Kimball to make contact with his girlfriend, LeAnn Emry, after his release. Likewise, he told Emry to do as Kimball told her to.

An Idaho native who had grown up in Colorado after her parents moved there, Emry, 24, had been diagnosed with bipolar disorder in her teens. She worked as a stripper and had briefly been married to a Texas man who was incarcerated at the time, which led to her growing involvement with people involved in drugs and other crimes. Kimball reached out to her near the end of 2002. Around the same time, he was also meeting with Marcum, and began including her in scams involving the theft of credit card-related checks from mail thrown away by local post offices. Unable to confide in Holley since he had been put in solitary, she clung more and more to Kimball, whom she admitted in an email to a cousin was "dangerous ... but if you don't fuck with him he's your best friend."

A week after writing that, on January 16, 2003, Emry returned to her parents' home in Centennial, Colorado and packed her car for what she said was a trip to Mexico to go caving, a hobby of hers. Shortly after she left, Emry phoned her sister to say that just in case anything happened to her, to remember that she loved her.

Instead of going to Mexico, she and Kimball spent the next week traveling through four different Western states, stealing checks worth a total of $15,000. They regularly charged their gas on her credit card; she also used it to buy a Toshiba laptop at a Best Buy. On January 27, Emry called her parents to tell them that she was staying in Mexico a little longer, but she was actually back in Colorado by then. That was the last time they heard from her.

Emry had apparently been in the Denver area, as she bought and mailed a gift certificate to her sister from there that same day. That night she checked into a hotel in Grand Junction, Colorado. A clerk recognized her from a photo but said later that her hair, long and blonde in the photo, had been cut short and dyed a dark color.

From the hotel she called a cousin. They talked for two hours, during which Emry said that if Kimball (for whom she used the alias "Hannibal") learned of the conversation he would kill both of them, although otherwise she was "pretty safe." She could not say where she was, but claimed to be with some corrupt police officers. Emry ended the call with a reminder similar to the one she had left her sister, that if anything happened to remember she loved her. Two days later, January 29, she checked out of the hotel.

According to Kimball's later account, he drove with her into Bryson Canyon in Utah's Book Cliffs. Near the end of the road, Kimball asked her to go hiking with him. They went up a wash into a dead-end box canyon, then up a cliff face. Emry told him his face just changed. Kimball ordered her to kneel on the rocks. He shot her in the head with a handgun she had bought for him a few days earlier, during their crime spree.

The day afterwards, her abandoned car was found near the nearby town of Moab, Utah, 40 miles (64 km) from Grand Junction. Her parents did not know anything was amiss until Holley wrote them two weeks later, worried that he had not heard from LeAnn in some time. Howard Emry, LeAnn's father, wrote back that he and his wife had not heard from her either, and began investigating. Holley told him of an FBI agent who had been in contact with LeAnn, but when Howard called the man, he said Holley was lying. Police were reluctant to investigate the case both because LeAnn was an adult who could make her own decisions, and, Howard Emry says, because of her background.

The Emrys tracked their daughter through her credit card records, learning that she had in fact never gone to Mexico. The cousin she had talked with before disappearing shared LeAnn's emails, in which she repeatedly expressed fear of Kimball (Holley would not identify Kimball when asked, likewise warning Howard that if he did, that would put the entire Emry family's lives at risk). When some gas purchases on LeAnn's credit card made in California surfaced from the days after she had left Grand Junction, Howard regained hope that she was still alive. But when he saw copies of the actual receipts, he realized they were not her signature. But police still showed little interest in taking the case. Her remains were found in March 2009 near the Colorado-Utah border in a remote area.

=== Jennifer Marcum ===
At another early meeting, Kimball told Schlaff that he had told Ennis that he would personally kill the witnesses against Ennis after his impending release. The next step, Kimball said, was for Ennis's girlfriend, Jennifer Marcum, to introduce him to Ennis's partner once he was out of prison. The partner would then give him the gun to kill the witnesses.

Within two weeks of his release from Englewood, Kimball made contact with Marcum, a 25-year-old high-school dropout who had moved to the Denver area with her young son from Illinois. At that time she was dancing at a strip club and living with her son's father in Colorado Springs, Colorado. Kimball told her he owned some coffee shops in Seattle and that she should move there and manage one of them for him. Schlaff would not let Kimball have sex with Marcum when he asked, due to the complications it might cause should either of them eventually have to testify in court against Ennis or anyone else involved.

When Marcum told Ennis about Kimball, he suggested she take him up on his coffee-shop offer and move to Seattle. It was the last time he, or anyone other than Kimball, ever heard from her. At a dinner recorded by the FBI, while Marcum did call one of the witnesses against Ennis a "scumbag ... [who] deserved to die", the conversation went no further in that direction. Kimball told Schlaff around the same time that shortly after the dinner, she had called and told him she was flying to New York for a while, where Ennis had also been involved in drug distribution and she had also worked as a stripper. He claimed she had spent $600 to buy a revolver to kill Ennis's partner while she was there.

Shortly after their dinner, however, Marcum moved all her belongings to Kimball's home in preparation for the move to Seattle. Schlaff later found that both Marcum and Kimball's cell phones, normally very busy, showed no activity at all the next day; Kimball did not resume using his for another three days and Marcum never did. Parking records at Denver International Airport showed that Marcum's green 1996 Saturn had been left there early on February 18. At the end of March, it was considered abandoned and towed for unpaid fees. Two letters to her Colorado Springs address seeking payment went unanswered. Her son's father said she had not visited or made contact since she moved out.

Two months later, Schlaff was driving Kimball to a meeting with Ennis's drug partner, Jason Price, at a local chain restaurant. The agent asked if he had heard any news about Marcum's whereabouts. Kimball said he had heard she was dead. This surprised Schlaff, as while he was aware that Marcum associated with drug dealers and assumed some risks by doing so, he did not think getting killed would have been one of them. Kimball could not provide any further details when Schlaff asked.

Schlaff recalled that he had been unable to reach Kimball the weekend Marcum disappeared. All of Marcum's furniture was also at Kimball's house, but he explained that by showing the agent a lease agreement, apparently signed by Marcum, allowing him to use her furniture for a year in exchange for $400.

Later that month, following Kimball's arrest at the airport upon his return from Alaska, Schlaff went to Kimball's jail cell to inform him that the FBI was done with him as an informant. But then Kimball told him that Price had confessed to him that he had killed Marcum. Price, he said, had shown him a photograph of her body, bound and gagged, before he put her in his trunk and drove to Rifle, Colorado, 150 miles (240 km) west of Denver, where he dumped it in a creek. Kimball added that Price asked him to go to the body and remove her breast implants, since he feared those could be used to identify her.

Schlaff questioned him along with Suzanne Halonen, the federal Drug Enforcement Administration agent who was still working the Ennis case. She doubted the story, since she did not think Price was capable of killing anyone. Additionally, she told her FBI colleague that she believed Kimball killed Marcum. But when challenged by Schlaff, she could not think of what his motive might be, and he passed a lie detector test on the question.

Marcum's parents, who had divorced shortly after her birth, grew concerned when months went by without her returning their calls. They allowed for the possibility that she had either dropped out of touch or simply did not want to talk to them, which were both possibilities given her history, and the police did not give the case much priority. But in 2004, Marcum's parents learned her abandoned car had been found the year before, which raised their suspicions. Kimball continued to claim he had last seen her on her way to the airport, but there was no record of her having made any plans or boarding any plane. They paid to have a billboard with Jennifer's picture and a tip hotline number erected above the strip club where she worked, offering a $20,000 reward.

In 2004, Marcum's father Bob had a friend in a local police department query a federal database for information on her. The search alerted Schlaff, who called Bob Marcum. The FBI agent told him that she had not been seen since renting her furniture to a man, but disclosed no other details, not even Kimball's name. Eventually he gave Bob Marcum Kimball's cell number and told him to ask for "Joe Snitch".

Marcum and his ex-wife went to Colorado to meet Kimball. After a genial meeting and lunch at a Broomfield restaurant, his demeanor became unsettling. Kimball told Bob the same story he had told Schlaff about how Ennis had killed her, showed him the pictures and then asked him to remove the breast implants (and, in this version, her IUD), and said that he could take Bob to where her body was the next day if he wanted. That night Kimball showed up at Jennifer Marcum's mother's hotel in Lakewood, and told her that if she signed a contract allowing him to tie her up and have sex with her, he would show her what the killer did to her daughter. She declined, fearing Kimball would kill her too. Both she and Bob Marcum now had no doubt he had killed Jennifer.

=== Kaysi McLeod ===
Earlier in January 2003, Lori McLeod had met Kimball at a poker table in the Lodge Casino in Black Hawk, Colorado, west of Denver. She had been impressed by how he wheeled his mother, suffering from multiple sclerosis, up to the table, and found him likable. When they got to know each other better after McLeod slipped him her phone number, he told her he was an FBI agent and showed her a badge (faked) and laptop with the bureau's seal on it. On Valentine's Day of that year, they dated for the first time, just before Jennifer Marcum disappeared. McLeod accepted Kimball's excuse that he could not tell her where he was going sometimes because of the secrecy requirements of his work with the FBI. The most he said he could tell her was that it involved the possible murder of a young woman named Jennifer.

Kaysi was Lori's 19-year-old daughter from one of her two previous marriages, who had run away from home on several occasions, had been charged with credit card fraud, and was recovering from methamphetamine addiction. At the time her mother met Kimball, Kaysi's life seemed to be improving. She had gotten clean, again living with Lori, making new friends, and had taken a part-time job at a Subway nearby.

Kimball explained his June 2003 arrest to a shaken McLeod as a ruse to burnish his FBI cover. Since he had been released relatively quickly without any apparent charges, she believed him. In August, he went on what he told Lori was a hunting trip.

While Kimball was away, Kaysi disappeared. After she missed one of her shifts at Subway, Lori was unable to reach her on her cell phone. The police declined to take a missing persons report, as (according to Lori) they said Kaysi was an adult who could disappear if she wanted to as long as she did not break the law. When Kimball returned a few days afterwards, he echoed that argument while consoling Lori, telling her Kaysi would eventually come back home. He also promised her that he would see what help his FBI connections could give them in finding Kaysi.

Kimball planted evidence to suggest that Kaysi was still alive. He supposedly found one of her gold necklaces dangling from her doorknob one day, and a makeup kit had also disappeared from her room. Furthermore, the owner of the property he and Lori rented in Adams County that summer claimed that Kaysi and her boyfriend had been seen driving by.

Lori continued searching for Kaysi. She found her daughter's boyfriend, who told her that he had last seen Kaysi being picked up by Kimball for work from the motel they had been staying at, which he also paid for, the night she missed her shift. McLeod began to wonder if Kimball knew where Kaysi was and possibly be in touch with her.

Shortly afterwards, Kimball proposed that he and McLeod get married, suggesting it would help her move on from Kaysi's disappearance, and also might help them find her. After they exchanged vows at a drive-through wedding chapel in Las Vegas, Kimball and McLeod returned to the Denver area, where Kimball's mother helped them take out life insurance policies. McLeod named Kimball as the sole beneficiary. In September the two went on a honeymoon camping trip in the Kremmling, Colorado area, not far from where Kaysi's remains would be found several years later.

=== Alleged attempted murder of Justin Kimball ===
The marriage was under considerable strain its first year. Kimball was absent even more than he had been before the wedding, and when he was home he was sometimes emotionally abusive. A particular target was his older son Justin, who had a very gentle personality. Kimball considered this feminine, and often called the boy "Susie" to highlight his disapproval.

One evening in July 2004, Kimball and the boys were out in the backyard digging holes. Cody, the younger one, ran in to tell McLeod to call 9-1-1 as Justin had been hurt, possibly with a broken leg. Kimball came in carrying his son in his arms and said something about his back. McLeod, by then on the phone, told the dispatcher there was a possible injury, but before she could complete the call, Kimball put Justin in his car and drove away. Accordingly, she told the dispatcher not to send an ambulance, as she presumed her husband was taking Justin to the nearest hospital.

When Lori McLeod and Cody reached the hospital, Justin was on a gurney, suffering convulsions and nausea, with blood all around him. The nurse said that the fall had caused serious injury. McLeod said he had been injured at her house and was not aware he had fallen in any way; the nurse explained that when he was brought in, his father said the boy had fallen out of the car. Kimball came in and said that Justin had also been hit in the head by a metal grate. On the way there, Kimball said, Justin meant to open the car window but opened the door instead and fell from the car at 60 miles per hour (97 km/h). Kimball did not believe Justin would survive.

When she heard about the incident, Barb Kimball went back to her insurance office and changed the beneficiary of the life insurance policy on Justin from Scott to herself. She later told one of her employees that she did so because she feared Scott had attempted to kill his son for the insurance money. He had, Barb said, asked her a few weeks earlier who the beneficiary was.

After two weeks in an induced coma, Justin survived. His first words once he could speak again were "Why did Dad do this to me?" He recalled his father dropping the grate on him, and then pushing him from the car. The neurosurgeon treating him said it was possible the injuries had affected his memory. Law enforcement investigated, but since the two injuries had occurred in different jurisdictions it was unclear which agency should take the lead, and no charges were filed, to the consternation of Justin's mother.

=== Terry Kimball ===
Kimball's uncle Terry Kimball came from his home in Alabama, along with his two dogs, to assist in Cody's care while Justin was hospitalized. Among the possessions he had brought along was a briefcase with thousands of dollars in cash that he had withdrawn from a savings account after an earlier divorce. He slept in Kaysi's room and began talking to Scott about going into business with him at Faith Farms, another business Scott had started the year before.

McLeod did not have to deal with Terry for long. One day she came home from work and found that the furniture had been rearranged. Scott had taken a white leather couch with a visible stain outside. When McLeod asked what the stain was, he said that one of his uncle's dogs had vomited on it. She did not think the stain was dog vomit, and told her husband so. He suggested that perhaps Terry had vomited on it himself and blamed the dogs, but in any event it did not matter since Terry won some money in the Ohio state lottery, met a stripper, and decided to move to Mexico.

Shortly thereafter, Karen Johnson, upset at not having heard from her husband, filed for divorce in the hope that would provoke him to respond to her. She called the Kimball home around Labor Day weekend to see where he was. Lori told her what Scott had told her about Terry running off to Mexico. The divorce papers, sent to the Kimballs' home, were returned, and the divorce finalized the following year.

In the weeks after Terry had disappeared, Terry's bank had noticed suspicious activity on his credit card, later traced to Scott. Scott also used his uncle's name to buy 21 head of cattle for almost $12,000 from a Brush, Colorado ranch in November. The ranch complained to the state Department of Agriculture after Kimball failed to pay. Terry's bank likewise found that over $23,000 in bad checks had been drawn on his account over four months. They reported it to the FBI, but it is not known what action the bureau took, if any.

A year after Terry Kimball disappeared, his brother Virgil, Scott's father, received a letter from an address with the email ID "terrykimball". Terry said he was enjoying himself in Mexico and was unlikely to return. There was no further contact with him. In 2009 his mummified body was discovered in a remote mountain pass near Vail, Colorado.

== Apprehension ==
By the end of 2005, Kimball's marriage to McLeod had deteriorated. He was away from home more often, showed less interest in finding Kaysi, and according to Lori, "managed to make me feel like I was just not cutting the mustard." She suspected he was also having an affair with a woman in California, where his travels were increasingly taking him. During that summer, Kimball had twice called the police, alleging domestic violence and leading to her arrest both times; McLeod claimed both incidents were fabrications so that Kimball could move a waitress he was having a relationship with into their house. By the fall he had moved out and rented a small house in Lafayette. He persuaded his girlfriend to buy him a gun, as he was legally prohibited from doing so due to his felony conviction, on the grounds that he would teach her how to hunt with the rifle, but once she gave him the gun she never saw it again.

In January 2006, an optometrist in Lafayette, concerned that his bank statement had not arrived, went to the bank to find out the status of his business's money market account. There he learned that there had been much more activity on it than he had been aware of. In the preceding three weeks, $83,000 had been deposited in it, and $55,000 had been written in checks, most of them to Kimball's beef company, which shared a nearby office with his mother's insurance agency.

Security camera footage from the bank showed Kimball making the deposits. Local police investigated, but could not talk to him, as he had left the state. Barb Kimball's employees told detective Gary Thatcher they had seen some of the optometrist's mail on Kimball's desk. A search of his office suggested that he had stolen the optometrist's statements from the poorly secured closet where the optometrist kept his business records; sheets of practice signatures and faked subpoenas to Lori McLeod were in the garbage. Kimball had also used an altered version of his mother's notary stamp to forge a lien release on a car he had severely damaged in an accident the month before. At Kimball's home, which he had now sublet, police found a trailer that he had collected a $10,000 insurance payment on after having reported it stolen.

Thatcher went to talk to Lori McLeod, who agreed to come to the police station for an interview. From there, she called her husband on speakerphone so Thatcher could listen, claiming she was at home in the bathroom. Kimball asked her to get some of his work mail, and the call ended. After the conversation, Thatcher asked what Kimball did for a living. McLeod told him he worked for the FBI. Thatcher suspected Kimball might be impersonating an agent as part of his sophisticated scams.

McLeod also told Thatcher about Kaysi's disappearance, and her growing suspicions that Kimball was responsible. Further investigation after the interview led Thatcher to talk to detectives in Louisville, Colorado about the incident with Justin. In March, he called the FBI to alert them about Kimball's possible impersonation. He was connected to Schlaff, who sarcastically expressed surprise at news that his former informant might be involved in more check-related criminal activity. After Thatcher informed Schlaff about Kaysi McLeod also going missing shortly after last being seen in Kimball's presence, the two realized that in addition to being a con artist and forger Kimball might also be a serial killer.

Thatcher and another FBI agent, Jonny Grusing, met to build a case against Kimball. They were preparing an arrest warrant for his many probation violations when they talked to Brett Kimball, who told them that his brother had given him some guns, which would have been illegal for him to possess. This was an additional charge, and the FBI immediately put the warrant out.

From Lori McLeod, Grusing and Thatcher got Kimball's new cell phone number. The FBI traced it to a neighborhood in Riverside, California, where he had been living with the girlfriend McLeod had suspected he had there, and alerted the local police that they would be attempting to make the arrest. Kimball left in his pickup truck at mid-afternoon March 14, followed by federal marshals in an unmarked car.

A car chase soon ensued. He called his girlfriend, who pleaded with him to turn himself in. He demurred, telling her he knew things the police would kill to keep him from telling. He led them south from Riverside, down the Coachella Valley towards the Salton Sea, finally pulling off the main roads near the small farming town of Mecca, where he ran out of gas in a field 260 miles (420 km) from where the chase began. After briefly threatening suicide during a phone call with Schlaff, he eventually surrendered, three hours after first fleeing.

== Prosecution ==
Kimball was taken back to Colorado briefly for arraignment on charges there, then back to Montana to serve time for his abscondment from the halfway house several years earlier. He was also sentenced to an additional two years in prison. In May, he was briefly taken back to Colorado where he pleaded guilty to the weapons charge that had led to his arrest, saying he wanted to "break this cycle that I'm in". He received ten months in prison followed by six months in another halfway house, to be served when his Montana sentence was concluded.

Hentz, Kimball's second wife, repeated her rape allegations to Thatcher and Grusing, and added that she suspected him of having at one time tried to poison her. A former Montanan cellmate of Kimball's who, after release, worked for his meat business recalled how one night while the two were drinking, Kimball, unprompted, asked him if "fake titties" were traceable; upon being told that they were, Kimball seemed visibly upset and later asked the man if he would, "as a favor for a friend", take something from a body. The man refused; the detectives were struck by the similarity to what Kimball had claimed Ennis told him.

Prosecutors in Boulder were also preparing charges against Kimball for his more recent scams, While Colorado law provided for quadrupling the sentences for crimes committed by habitual criminals like Kimball, they were still not sure they could put him in prison for the time they believed he deserved for the murders. They got their break when Lori McLeod, who had been evicted from the condo where she and Kimball had lived after his arrest, began looking through his boxed possessions. In one she found Kaysi's handwritten schedule for the last week she had worked at Subway. She had also begun to suspect that the supposed signs that Kaysi was still alive—the necklace, the missing makeup, and the landlord's sighting—had been arranged by Kimball.

McLeod went to the police, and their searches turned up other evidence connecting Kimball to Kaysi's disappearance: the hat from her work uniform and her personal date book. Also found was a receipt for food from a supermarket in the northern Colorado town of Walden, dated the day after Kaysi had last been seen, a weekend when Schlaff had recalled being unable to reach Kimball, who told him afterwards that he was scouting some terrain for a future hunting trip.

Also in the boxes was documentation of the Yahoo! email account Kimball had set up in his late uncle's name and the laptop Emry had bought for Kimball during their crime spree. On it they found many rape pornography images; similar material was on his desktop. Kimball had also kept a file of newspaper clippings about Dennis Rader, the "BTK Killer" in neighboring Kansas, who also tortured his victims. One of the photographs on the laptop that most disturbed them depicted a young woman who was not in any distress, just smiling. They believed it might be another potential victim they had not known about; Holley identified her as Emry and told the investigators he had not heard from her since shortly after Kimball's release, when he had told them both to get in touch with each other.

In April 2007, Grusing went to Routt National Forest, near Walden, to see whether the area would be a good place to hide a body. While buying a map, he mentioned that he was with the FBI investigating a possible murder. Rangers told him that a hunter had recently found a human skull that appeared to belong to a young woman. A DNA test confirmed that it was Kaysi McLeod's.

With proof that at least one of the missing people last known to have been seen in Kimball's company was in fact dead, Grusing and Thatcher had some leverage with him. The prosecutors had determined that his more recent forgeries and financial crimes justified a 48-year sentence when the quadrupling for his habitual-offender status was taken into account. They told Kimball that if he pled guilty to those charges and revealed the locations of the other three bodies, he would face only one count of second-degree murder, the sentence to run concurrently with the time for the fraud charges. If he declined, he would face separate charges for all the murders, which made the death penalty a possibility.

Kimball accepted the deal. After he signed, he told all present to prepare for a trip to Utah where he showed them to LeAnn Emry's body outside Moab. On the way back towards Denver, he revealed where he had buried his uncle Terry in Vail Pass. But he was less certain of where Jennifer Marcum's body lay; after several locations he identified turned up empty, he concluded that he had forgotten where he had put her.

Investigators were doubtful, believing he was holding the location back for future negotiations. Since only two of the three remaining bodies had been found, there was no deal. Kimball caused some disruption prior to his October 2009 sentencing when, through his lawyer, he circulated what appeared to be official FBI summaries of interviews with some of the other people he had been associated with. They suggested that Ennis had gotten immunity for telling the FBI he and Kimball ran a rape-porn business, and that Marcum, McLeod and Emry had been killed at the behest of drug dealers imprisoned at Englewood whose business they had cut into by smuggling drugs into the prison on visits. Coet read a statement from Kimball after his cousin pleaded guilty to all four murders and was sentenced to 70 years, blaming the FBI for pushing him into a criminal world more dangerous than anything he had previously encountered without any guidance or support. The FBI later determined that the summaries had been forged by Kimball during his confinement.

== Other crimes ==
Since Kimball's sentencing, prosecutors and investigators expressed to the media their belief that the four murders he pled to were not the only ones he had committed. Boulder County DA Stan Garnett said Kimball reportedly bragged to others that he had killed "dozens." "It's hard to imagine we caught him on everything he did," declared Katharina Booth, one of the assistant DAs who prosecuted him, observing that his four victims were people on society's margins, who would not be quickly missed. Kaysi McLeod's father noted that over the decade and a half from his first arrest to his ultimate capture, there was a lot of time during which he is unaccounted for. Grusing further noted the speed and ease with which Kimball committed the murders he is serving time for suggest he had previous experience.

The FBI strongly suspects Kimball in two other murders. In September 2010, it was reported that the bureau was investigating him as a possible suspect in the murder and mutilation of Catrina Powerll, a young woman who lived a troubled life similar to those of Kimball's other female victims. She was found in Westminster, in October 2004, while he lived in the area under FBI supervision. Three months later, Kimball told a cousin that he had been proposed as a suspect in the West Mesa murders in New Mexico, which were committed during the same period that he was living in the Denver area. He denied involvement.

Five years later, a former cellmate of Kimball's at Sterling Correctional Facility in northeastern Colorado told the FBI that Kimball and another inmate had solicited him to plan a helicopter escape and murder two people on the outside, in Kimball's case a former business associate. After the inmate's parole in 2017, he continued working with the FBI to get evidence against the two. In September, on the day the escape was to happen, Kimball and the other inmate, waiting in the prison yard for the expected helicopter, were instead arrested and charged with attempted escape and solicitation to commit murder. The latter charge was eventually dropped after the local district attorney was herself indicted on drug charges, but Kimball pleaded guilty to the attempted escape in 2020 and was sentenced to four years to be served concurrently, and transferred to the maximum security Colorado State Penitentiary outside Cañon City. Once there he was placed on 20-hour lockdown.

== Aftermath ==
Lori McLeod had her marriage to Kimball annulled in 2008. At his sentencing, she said that she felt Kaysi had forgiven him, and thus she was also willing to forgive him. Kimball has since remarried, to a woman similarly incarcerated in a Kansas prison for child abuse. They have never met physically.

Theodore Peyton, whose sexual abuse of the teenaged Kimball led to the suicide attempt that scarred his forehead and, according to Coet, permanently changed him for the worse, died in January 2017. His body was found outside his Nederland cabin. The cause was found to be heart disease, with other chronic conditions listed as contributing factors. He served five years of a seven-year sentence after Kimball and his other victims came forward, but escaped being required to register as a sex offender until the late 2000s.

=== 2010 state Attorney General election ===
A year after Kimball's sentencing, Garnett became the Democratic nominee for Colorado Attorney General, running against Republican John Suthers, the incumbent. Garnett ran campaign ads contrasting his office's successful prosecution of Kimball with Suthers having, as U.S. Attorney in 2003, signed the documents authorizing the plea deal that allowed Kimball to work as an FBI informant. Coet, Kimball's cousin, at the time writing SLK, a fictionalized depiction of Kimball, said that while that criticism was legitimate Garnett should also not rule out blaming some of his own prosecutors in Boulder. Coet argued that after Justin Kimball's suspicious 2004 head injury, Garnett's assistant DAs could have tried harder to find a second neurologist to examine the boy and determine whether his memory had been affected (in the years since, he had continued to recall the incident vividly). Had another doctor been willing to vouch for the accuracy of Justin's recollections of the event, neighboring Adams County might have been able to develop a case and try Kimball for assault or attempted murder.

Garnett agreed that that case, which his office and Adams County had both decided lacked sufficient evidence, could have turned out differently, but ultimately it introduced them to Kimball and made them take a closer look when the later frauds came to light. Suthers' handling of the Kimball cases, by contrast, was part of a pattern of poor management when he had been U.S. Attorney, in charge of the small office of federal prosecutors in the state. Coet said there was plenty of blame to go around.

=== FBI internal investigation ===
To determine who it should blame, the FBI's Office of Professional Responsibility (OPR) launched an internal investigation. In 2012, at a hearing in Washington, D.C., Schlaff was harshly criticized for his handling of Kimball. The OPR asked why he had not known about the rape and kidnapping charges Hentz had brought against her ex-husband, about Kimball's interest in rape pornography and his taste for prostitutes. Ennis also told investigators that he had never asked either Kimball or Marcum to kill a witness against him. Schlaff said the bureau's investigations of potential informants did not typically reach into those areas. OPR also found much fault with his decision to continue using Kimball after the Seattle debacle, and he was ultimately suspended for three weeks.

On appeal it was reduced by one week, but Schlaff's FBI career was effectively over, and his superiors in the Denver office did not want him working any more criminal cases. He left the bureau in 2013, and after working in taxidermy and private security, returned to law enforcement in 2020 with the Fairplay, Colorado, police. He believes he was scapegoated for Kimball, noting that two other agents ran him first, yet they were not disciplined.

Kimball's value as an informant was limited even in the one case where his information did result in a conviction. Arnold Flowers, the Alaska inmate who Kimball had claimed was planning to have a witness, the prosecutor and the judge killed, turned out to have only said that if the witness decided not to take the stand "everything will be fine". The jury hearing the case convicted him only of witness tampering for that remark, finding it too ambiguous to support an attempted murder charge. In 2016 Flowers was returned to prison after being convicted of wire fraud; he remains there as of 2021.

=== Kimball in prison ===
Early in 2011, Kimball reportedly wrote a lengthy handwritten letter to his family describing in greater detail the deaths of all four of his victims. His accounts were slightly different from those he had previously given. The FBI also received a copy.

Kimball took responsibility for Emry's death, which he had previously attributed to someone else, saying he had shot her twice when she tried to escape. While he had earlier simply claimed to have merely made it possible for someone else to kill Marcum but had been present at her death, he now said he had prepared a fatal heroin "hot shot" for her. Kimball again attributed Kaysi McLeod's death to drugs, saying she had taken a combination of alcohol, meth and Oxycodone and then overdosed in his presence near where her body was found. He repeated his earlier confession to killing Terry Kimball.

Coet, who discussed the content of the letter with the media, was encouraged by the letters, noting that although his cousin might not be telling the whole truth he had admitted to a greater role in the killings than previously. "[H]e so desperately needs mental health care", Coet told Westword. Coet believed Kimball had had some sort of religious awakening and was seeking redemption.

In a 2021 interview with The Atavist, Kimball offered two more different explanations for the Marcum, McLeod and Emry killings. At first he said the three women were all blackmailing him or threatening to expose his criminal schemes to the FBI. Later he claimed the murders were done for a biker gang. His uncle, he said, was a child molester. None of those claims could be corroborated.

That same year it was reported that Kimball had been moved out of the Colorado prison system. The state's Department of Corrections confirmed that he was transferred out of state but did not say where; Kimball's name no longer returns any results when searched on the department's website. A search of the Federal Bureau of Prisons website found that he had been moved to United States Penitentiary, Coleman, in central Florida. No reason has been given for the move.

As of July 2023, he has been moved back to Colorado, at the United States Penitentiary, Florence High.

== Popular culture ==
The CBS News series 48 Hours outlines Kimball's case in an episode titled "Hannibal Unmasked", originally aired April 2010.

The NBC News series Dateline NBC aired another telling of the Kimball story on September 21, 2018, with updates since the CBS version.

ID Channel series Evil Lives Here Season 5 Episode 3 (Evil Undercover), originally aired January 13, 2019.

On The Case with Paula Zahn - Season 26 EP. 3

On January 26, 2025, the true crime TV series Very Scary People first aired the episode, "The Real Hannibal" about the life of Scott Kimball.

== See also ==
- Crime in Colorado
- List of murder convictions without a body
- List of serial killers in the United States
