= Khalfan Khamis Mohamed =

Member of al-Qaeda serving a life sentence in a US federal prison

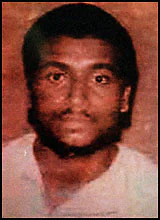
- Mohamed in an undated photo
- Born: 5 March 1974 (age 52); Pemba, Tanzania
- Other names: Elfani Hamis Ahmed, Zahran Nassor Maulid
- Status: Incarcerated at USP Canaan, Pennsylvania
- Criminal charges: Terrorism
- Penalty: Life imprisonment without the possibility of parole

Khalfan Khamis Mohamed (Arabic: خلفان النعيمي; born 5 March 1974), a Tanzanian national, is one of numerous al-Qaeda suspects who were indicted in 1998, and one of the four who were convicted and sentenced to life without parole in 2001, for their parts in the 1998 United States embassy bombings. Convicted along with Mohamed were Wadih el Hage, Mohammed Saddiq Odeh, and Mohamed Rashed Daoud Al-Owhali.

Mohamed is currently held in the high-security federal prison USP Canaan in Waymart, Pennsylvania.

== Background and arrest ==
Mohamed was born on Pemba Island in the country of Tanzania. Khalfan Mohamed allegedly joined al-Qaeda and received militant training in Afghanistan. It is believed that Mohamed assembled the bomb used against the embassy in the Dar es Salaam, Tanzania, and flew to South Africa shortly after the bombing. He was arrested in Cape Town on October 5, 1999, after he was discovered to still be using the same alias he had used during the bombings. After interrogation, South African immigration authorities handed him over to FBI agents and he was flown to New York on the following day. (This extradition subsequently became the subject of a landmark decision of the Constitutional Court of South Africa, Mohamed v President of the Republic of South Africa, which determined that the South African government cannot extradite suspects who may face the death penalty.)

In June 2014, he successfully sued the US government for violating his Freedom of Speech by prohibiting his communications with all but a few immediate family members.

On October 6, 2023, he was transferred from ADX Florence to adjacent USP Florence High. In January 2026, he was transferred to USP Canaan in Pennsylvania.

== Failed escape ==
On November 2, 2000, Mohamed and Mamdouh Mahmud Salim (also of al-Qaeda) attacked a federal prison guard in a failed escape attempt. The officer was critically injured, having been stabbed in the eye with a sharpened comb, and suffered severe brain damage from the attack. During the sentencing phase of his trial, prosecutors argued unsuccessfully for capital punishment of Mohamed, due to the continuing threat he posed to prison guards.
