= Federal Correctional Complex, Coleman =

United States federal prison in Florida

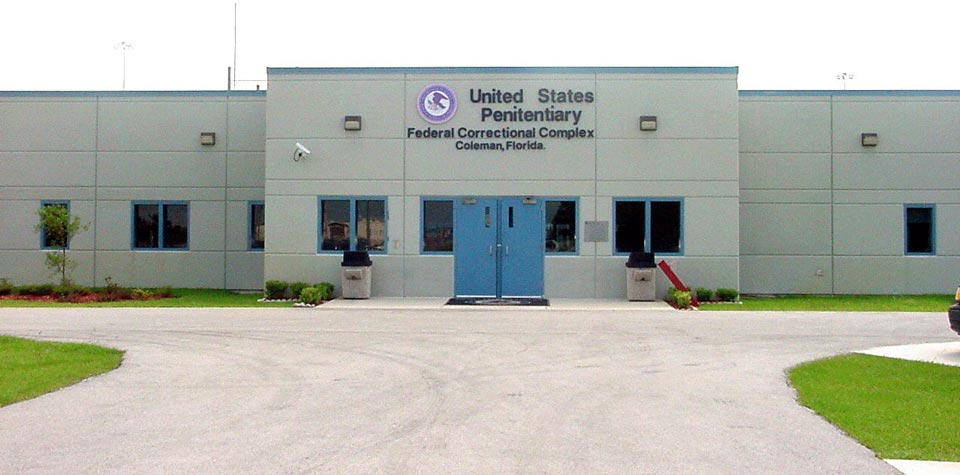
- Location: Sumter County, near Wildwood, Florida
- Status: Operational
- Population: 7,200 (four facilities and prison camp)
- Managed by: Federal Bureau of Prisons

The Federal Correctional Complex, Coleman (FCC Coleman) is a United States federal prison complex for male inmates in unincorporated Sumter County, Florida, near Wildwood. It is operated by the Federal Bureau of Prisons (BOP), a division of the United States Department of Justice.

The facility is located in central Florida, approximately 50 miles (80 km) northwest of Orlando, 60 miles (97 km) northeast of Tampa, and 35 miles (56 km) south of Ocala.

The complex has 1,600 acres (650 ha) of space. As of 2010, the complex, the largest correctional facility operated in the nation, altogether houses 7,120 prisoners, and 1,300 employees, making it one of the largest employers in the county. Most prisoners, with the exception of prisoners housed at United States Penitentiary, Coleman 1, are sentenced for drug-related crimes and were not convicted of violent acts. According to Rachel Monroe of The Atlantic, the prison has held several unusual or notable criminals.

Prisoners housed at FCC Coleman are all male. The prisoners on average have sentences of 10 years. Press reports indicate female prisoners, who previously were held at the adjacent satellite prison camp, were raped by staff and that widespread sexual abuse occurred. Prosecutors have been unable to prosecute cases against the employees due to lack of evidence.

The complex consists of four facilities:

- Federal Correctional Institution, Coleman Low (FCI Coleman Low): a low-security facility.
- Federal Correctional Institution, Coleman Medium (FCI Coleman Medium): a medium-security facility with an adjacent satellite prison camp for minimum-security inmates.
- United States Penitentiary I, Coleman (USP Coleman I): a high-security facility.
- United States Penitentiary II, Coleman (USP Coleman II): a high-security facility.

== See also ==
- List of United States federal prisons
- Incarceration in the United States
