= United States Penitentiary, Allenwood =

Federal prison in Pennsylvania

Coordinates: 41.131°N 76.927°W

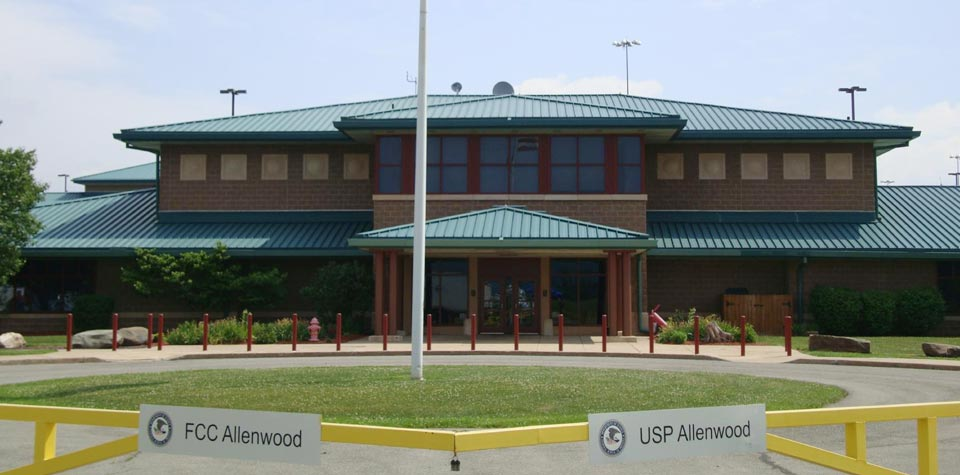
- Interactive map of United States Penitentiary, Allenwood
- Location: Gregg Township, Union County, near Allenwood, Pennsylvania
- Status: Operational
- Security class: Maximum security
- Population: 306 (as of September 2023)
- Opened: 1993
- Managed by: Federal Bureau of Prisons
- Warden: G. Swaney
- Website: www.bop.gov/locations/institutions/alp/

The United States Penitentiary, Allenwood, also known as USP Allenwood, is a maximum security United States federal prison in Pennsylvania. It is part of the Allenwood Federal Correctional Complex (FCC Allenwood) and is operated by the Federal Bureau of Prisons, a division of the United States Department of Justice.

FCC Allenwood is located on U.S. Route 15 in Gregg Township, Union County, near White Deer. It is approximately halfway between the cities of Williamsport and Lewisburg and approximately 75 miles (120 kilometers) north of Harrisburg, Pennsylvania, the state capital.

== Facility and programs ==
USP Allenwood has four two-level housing units each of which consists of four 16-cell ranges around a central dayroom where inmates can congregate during the times they are allowed outside their cells. Most cells house two inmates each. Recreational and counseling facilities are located adjacent to the housing units. The outer perimeter is secured by a double line of fencing with rolled barbed wire on the ground in between the fences. The inner fence is equipped with a perimeter intrusion detection system and a road for patrol vehicles runs along the outer fence. Correction officers man six guard towers at each corner of the security fence and a seventh within the fence.

Educational programs include GED, ESL, adult continuing education, vocational training, correspondence classes, and evening college classes. Inmates work in a UNICOR upholstery factory and institutional maintenance jobs such as food service and building repair. Medical, psychological and drug treatment services are also available.

== Incidents ==
=== 1996 murder ===
In April 1996, USP Allenwood inmate David Paul Hammer allegedly strangled fellow inmate Andrew Hunt Marti to death with a piece of homemade cord. Hammer and Marti were cellmates in the Special Housing Unit, where especially violent inmates are held. Writing on a website dedicated to his case in 2001, Hammer could not ‘attribute any motive’ to his actions. Hammer, a career criminal who was serving a 1,200-year sentence for crimes including larceny, shooting with intent to kill, kidnapping and making bomb threats, subsequently pleaded guilty to Marti's murder and was sentenced to death by the electric chair.

The death sentence was vacated in 2006 after a federal judge found that prosecutors withheld evidence during the penalty phase that would have bolstered Hammer's claim that he and Marti were having consensual sex. In July 2014, another federal judge concurred, ruling that a life sentence was appropriate based upon multiple circumstances, including Hammer's acceptance of responsibility and remorsefulness, his extended family history of dysfunction, abuse and mental illness, his mental and emotional impairments and his self-improvement, specifically citing Hammer's writing to at-risk children and counseling them against engaging in criminal conduct.

=== 2005 murder ===
On September 28, 2005, USP Allenwood inmates Ritz Williams (47085-008) and Shawn Cooya (48896-008) stabbed a fellow inmate, 50-year-old Alvin Allery, ten times with a homemade knife and repeatedly kicked him in the head and torso, causing Allery's death. Williams and Cooya were already serving lengthy sentences, Williams for murder and Cooya for weapons violations. A subsequent investigation revealed that Williams and Cooya planned the attack in advance. In 2013, Williams and Cooya pleaded guilty to first-degree murder and were sentenced to life imprisonment without the possibility of parole. As of March 2022, Williams is currently incarcerated at USP Victorville and Cooya is at ADX Florence.

=== 2020 attack ===
On December 7, 2020, two correctional officers were injured after one was stabbed in the neck and eye by Abdulrahman el Bahnasawy (75868-054), a Canadian convicted of terrorism-related offenses in 2016. Both officers were taken via ambulance to Geisinger Medical Center in Danville and survived, with one losing an eye. In April 2021, El Bahnasawy was transferred to ADX Florence.

== Notable inmates ==
Inmate name	Register number	Status	Details
Ahmed Ajaj	40637-053	Serving a 114-year sentence; scheduled for release in 2091. Now at USP Coleman	Convicted of participating in the 1993 World Trade Center bombing
Mohamud Salad Ali	77992-083	Serving life sentence; currently at USP Atwater	Somali pirate leader who pleaded guilty in 2011 to piracy in connection with the 2011 hijacking of the civilian yacht Quest, during which four U.S. citizens were killed
Auburn Calloway	14601-076	Serving two life sentences without the possibility of parole; currently at USP McCreary	Flight engineer convicted of attempted aircraft piracy, interference with flight crew, and attempted terrorism in the attempted hijacking of a Federal Express flight from Memphis, Tennessee to San Jose, California
Paul Anthony Ciancia	67089-112	Serving a life sentence without the possibility of parole plus 60 years. Currently at USP Victorville	Pleaded guilty in 2016 for the 2013 LAX Shooting
Louis Daidone	39065-053	Serving life sentence; currently at USP Coleman	Former acting boss of the Lucchese Crime Family in New York City; convicted in 2004 of murder, murder conspiracy, racketeering, and loansharking
James Alex Fields Jr.	22239-084	Serving a life sentence; transferred to Allenwood from USP Hazleton in November 2020.	White supremacist who pleaded guilty in 2019 of 29 federal hate crime charges for using his car to harm counter-protestors during the Unite the Right rally in Charlottesville, Virginia, killing one and injuring up to 19 more.
Gazi Ibrahim Abu Mezer	48705-053	Serving a life sentence	Convicted of being part of the 1997 Brooklyn bombing plot which was a plan to bomb the New York City Subway.
James Eagan Holmes	02350-122	Serving 12 consecutive life sentences plus 3,318 years without parole.	Mass murderer responsible for the 2012 Aurora, Colorado, shooting in which he killed 12 people and injured 70 others
Vyacheslav Ivankov	30219-048	Released in July 2004 for extradition	Convicted of extortion in January 1997
Christopher Jeburk	09029-021	Serving a life sentence	Bank robber on FBI Ten Most Wanted list; kidnapped bank teller and her family, then escaped from prison twice before he could be sentenced for his crimes
Salvador Magluta	26012-037	Scheduled release date is 2165	Convicted of falsifying documents (1996) and bribery, money laundering (2002); sentenced to 9 years in prison, plus 195 years; His sentence was reduced to 195 years on appeal. He was transferred to the supermax federal prison facility in Florence, Colorado.
Howard Mason	24651-053	Serving a life sentence	Convicted in 1989 of racketeering charges in connection with his leadership of "The Bebos," a drug cartel in Queens, New York; ordered the 1988 murder of a New York City police officer
El Sayyid Nosair	35074-054	Serving a life sentence; transferred to USP Big Sandy	Egyptian-born American citizen convicted of involvement in the 1993 New York City landmark bomb plot; earlier acquitted of the 1990 New York City assassination of Meir Kahane, he later admitted to having committed this assassination. serving a life sentence; transferred to USP Big Sandy
Esteban Santiago-Ruiz	15500-104	Serving five life sentences plus 120 years; transferred to USP Tucson	Mass murderer pleaded guilty to the 2017 Fort Lauderdale airport shooting
Hosam Smadi	39482-177	Scheduled release in 2031	Pleaded guilty in 2010 to the attempted use of a weapon of mass destruction for plotting to destroy the 60-story Fountain Place office building in Dallas, Texas with a truck bomb in 2009
Kifano Jordan	86333-054	Serving a 15-year sentence; scheduled for release in 2031	Better known as Shotti. Former manager of American rapper 6ix9ine. Pleaded guilty to firearms charges.

== See also ==
- List of U.S. federal prisons
- Federal Bureau of Prisons
- Incarceration in the United States
