= United States Penitentiary, Big Sandy =

High-security federal prison in Kentucky, US

Coordinates: 37°46′17″N 82°38′45″W

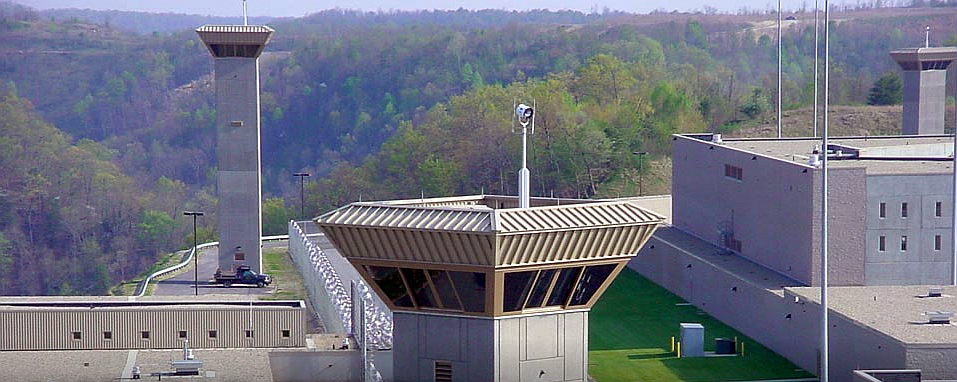
- Interactive map of United States Penitentiary, Big Sandy
- Location: Martin County, near Inez, Kentucky, United States
- Status: Operational
- Security class: High-security (with minimum-security prison camp)
- Population: 1,441 [1,405 at the USP, 36 in prison camp] (September 2023)
- Opened: 2003
- Managed by: Federal Bureau of Prisons

The United States Penitentiary, Big Sandy (USP Big Sandy) is a high-security United States federal prison for male inmates in unincorporated Martin County, Kentucky, near the city of Inez. It is operated by the Federal Bureau of Prisons, a division of the United States Department of Justice. The facility also has a satellite prison camp which houses minimum-security male inmates.

USP Big Sandy is located in eastern Kentucky, approximately 133 miles (214 km) from Lexington, 140 miles (230 km) from Frankfort, and 320 miles (510 km) from Washington, DC.

== Facility ==
USP Big Sandy is located both on a mountaintop removal mining site and a former underground coal mine. Due to the underground mine, the federal government spent $40 million to remediate the site before construction and had to spend additional millions after construction began to fix further issues, making the project the most expensive federal prison project at the time. Harvard University owned the oil and gas rights to the property and was leasing that property to Columbia Gas at the start of the prison construction.

The prison is known for housing multiple high-profile inmates. The facility houses a large number of people who were convicted of crimes in Washington, D.C. due to the National Capital Revitalization and Self-Government Improvement Act of 1997, which gave the Federal Bureau of Prisons custody of sentenced DC felons. As of 2013 up to about 33% had been convicted of DC crimes. Additionally, many federal inmates are sent there because they have been convicted of violent crimes and are now serving long sentences.

== Notable incidents ==
Numerous violent incidents, mostly stabbings, have occurred at USP Big Sandy since it opened in 2003.

=== 2006 ===
In October 2006, USP Big Sandy inmate Terrell Johnson (16390-047), 33, who was serving a sentence for armed bank robbery, killed inmate Calvin Speight by stabbing him in the neck with a prison-made weapon known as a shank. Johnson pleaded guilty to the charge of second degree murder in August 2008 and was sentenced to 26 additional years in prison in 2009. Johnson is currently being held at USP Florence, the high security United States Penitentiary that is part of the Florence Complex in Colorado. He is scheduled for release in 2035.

On November 12, 2006, inmates Darryl Milburne (58478-066) and Dwaune Gravely (12867-050) beat and choked fellow inmate Shamoni Peterson to death. Milburne and Gravely were charged with murder, assault, and evidence tampering. Milburne pleaded guilty to second degree murder and was sentenced to an additional 17.5 years, while Gravely was convicted of first degree murder and sentenced to life without parole. Milburne was transferred to USP Hazelton and is scheduled for release on January 3, 2025. Gravely is at USP Atlanta.

=== 2007 ===
On November 4, 2007, USP Big Sandy inmate Eric Eymard (17628-045) repeatedly stabbed his cellmate in the neck with a shank. After the assault, Eymard told correctional officers that he had intended to kill his cellmate, who required surgery and hospitalization. On May 21, 2009, while being prepared for transportation from USP Big Sandy to a hearing in Federal District Court in Ashland, Kentucky, Eymard stabbed two correctional officers with a sharp weapon which he had shaped from plexiglas.

As a result of Eymard's attack, one officer was left with cuts to his head and face and the other suffered a puncture wound under his left eye. Eymard subsequently pleaded guilty in connection with both incidents and was sentenced to 45 years in prison, which a federal judge ordered him to serve consecutively to his original sentence. Eymard is now at USP Allenwood.

=== 2008 ===
In early 2008, inmate Steven Michael Reid (11728-018) threw scalding water on a prison unit manager's face and neck. As a result of Reid's assault, the unit manager suffered first and second degree burns to the face, neck, and chest. Reid was sentenced to an additional 20 years in prison in February 2009.

Inmate Adam Oliveri (50045-054) stabbed a correctional officer in the head, back, and arm with a prison-made weapon on October 21, 2008, causing the officer to suffer several injuries. Oliveri was convicted after a three-day trial in 2010 and sentenced to an additional 17 years in prison, extending his release date to 2029. Oliveri is now at FCI Schuylkill.

On December 10, 2008, inmate Manuel Cardosa attacked a fellow inmate from behind as the inmate walked in a prison housing unit. Cardosa knocked the victim inmate to the floor and repeatedly jumped with both feet on his victim inmate's head, causing the victim inmate to suffer permanent and life-threatening injuries. Cardosa was sentenced to an additional eight years in prison on October 5, 2009. He was released from prison on April 8, 2019.

=== 2009 ===
John Travis Millner (32011-007) stabbed fellow inmate Vincent Earl Smith Jr. at USP Big Sandy with a prison-made ice pick before strangling him to death in January 2009. Court records are unclear as to what sparked the conflict between the two men, both from Washington, DC. Millner was already serving a life sentence for shooting and killing a person using a high-powered rifle on New Year's Eve 2002. The Department of Justice considered pursuing the death penalty, but Millner was ultimately sentenced to serve an additional life sentence. Millner is now at USP Florence High.

=== 2010 ===
Steven Michael Reid, who had already been sentenced to 20 additional years in prison connection with a 2008 assault on staff (see above), stabbed a correctional officer in the stomach on June 24, 2010, with a two-foot-long (60 cm) spear-type object made of two rolled up magazines and a sharpened piece of plexiglas. Reid had coated the tip of the weapon with feces. In January 2011, Reid was sentenced to an additional 15 years in prison, and is scheduled for release in 2049. Reid is now at USP Atlanta.

== Notable inmates (current and former) ==
Name	BOP Number	Status	Details
Ruslan Maratovich Asainov	91782-053	Serving a life sentence. Currently at ADX Florence	Convicted of conspiring with the terrorist group ISIS.
Charles McArther Emmanuel "Chuckie Taylor"	76556-004	Serving a 97-year sentence; scheduled for release in 2090. transferred to USP Lee	Son of former Liberian dictator Charles Taylor; convicted in 2008 of crimes related to the torture of his father's political and military opponents in Liberia between 1999 and 2003; the first prosecution of a US citizen for committing acts of torture outside the US.
Vincent Basciano	30694-054	Serving 2 life sentences. Currently at USP Coleman.	Former boss of the Bonanno crime family in 2004 after Boss Joseph Massino was arrested; convicted in 2006 of murder, conspiracy and racketeering; convicted in 2011 of ordering the 2004 murder of Bonanno associate Randolph Pizzolo.
Thomas Pitera	29465-053	Serving a life sentence.	Former hitman for the Bonanno crime family in New York City; convicted in 1992 of murder and murder conspiracy for torturing and murdering six people, as well as racketeering for operating a large drug trafficking operation.
Kodak Black	18149-104	Serving a 46-month sentence; scheduled for release on October 7, 2022. Transferred to USP Thomson. Sentence commuted on January 20, 2021, by President Donald Trump	Serving a 46-month sentence for falsifying information on a background form to purchase a firearm.
Albuquerque Cosper Head	39902-509	Given a 90-month sentence. Sentence commuted on January 20, 2021, by President Donald Trump	Convicted of assaulting Capitol officer Michael Fanone during the 2021 January 6 United States Capitol attack. He dragged Fanone on the ground by his neck while other rioters in the crowd beat Fanone and attacked him with a stun gun.
Gerald “Prince” Miller	10766-050	Serving a life sentence.	Former leader of the Supreme Team drug ring in Queens, New York. Convicted of racketeering, murder, and drug trafficking charges in 1993. Ordered the murder of Isaac Bolden, a man he suspected of robbing the organization.
Abdul Ibrahim West	76811-066	Serving a 45-year sentence. Scheduled release date on April 30, 2056.	Also known as rapper AR-Ab, convicted in 2019 on narcotics and drug trafficking charges for leading a drug ring in North Philadelphia.
Auburn Calloway	14601-076	Serving consecutive life sentences with no possibility of parole. Currently at USP Coleman.	Hijacker of Federal Express Flight 705 in 1994.
Chevie Kehoe	21300-009	Serving life sentence. Currently at USP Terre Haute.	White supremacist convicted on charges of racketeering, racketeering in aid of murder and robbery conspiracy in connection to the kidnapping, torture and murders of William and Nancy Mueller and their 8-year-old daughter, Sarah Powell. Co-defendant Daniel Lewis Lee was executed for the murders at United States Penitentiary, Terre Haute on July 14, 2020. Transferred into Big Sandy from USP McCreary in April 2021.
El Sayyid Nosair	35074-054	Serving a life sentence.	Egyptian-born American citizen, convicted of involvement in the 1993 New York City landmark bomb plot. He had earlier been tried for, but acquitted of, the 1990 New York City assassination of Meir Kahane, a Jewish religious figure and far-right Israeli politician. He later admitted to have committed this assassination as well.
Jack Teixeira	54136-510	Serving 180 months. Currently at ADX Florence.	Jack Teixeira is an American former airman in the 102nd Intelligence Wing of the Massachusetts Air National Guard. In April 2023, following an investigation into the removal and disclosure of hundreds of classified Pentagon documents, Teixeira was arrested by FBI agents and charged with unauthorized retention and transmission of national defense information.
Anderson Lee Aldrich	95144-510	Serving a life sentence.	Committed a mass shooting at a nightclub in Colorado Springs, Colorado, killing 5.

== See also ==
- List of U.S. federal prisons
- Federal Bureau of Prisons
- Incarceration in the United States
