= United States Penitentiary, Coleman =

High-security United States federal prison in Florida

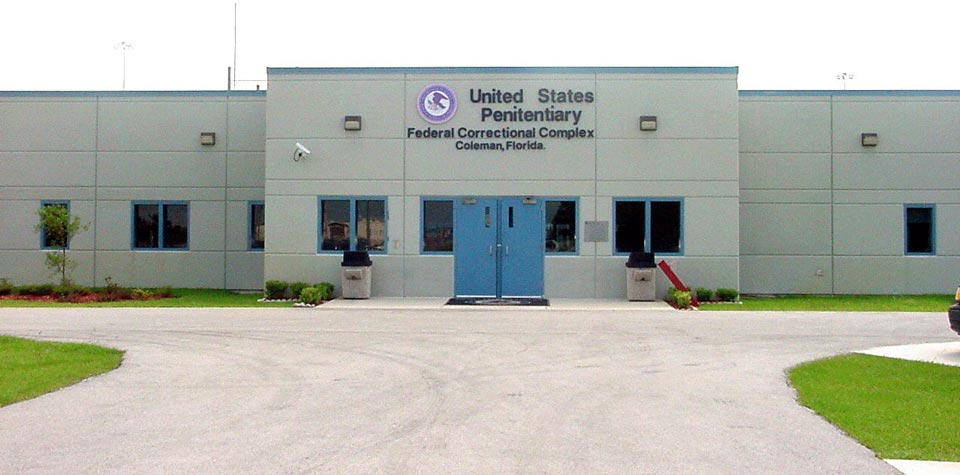
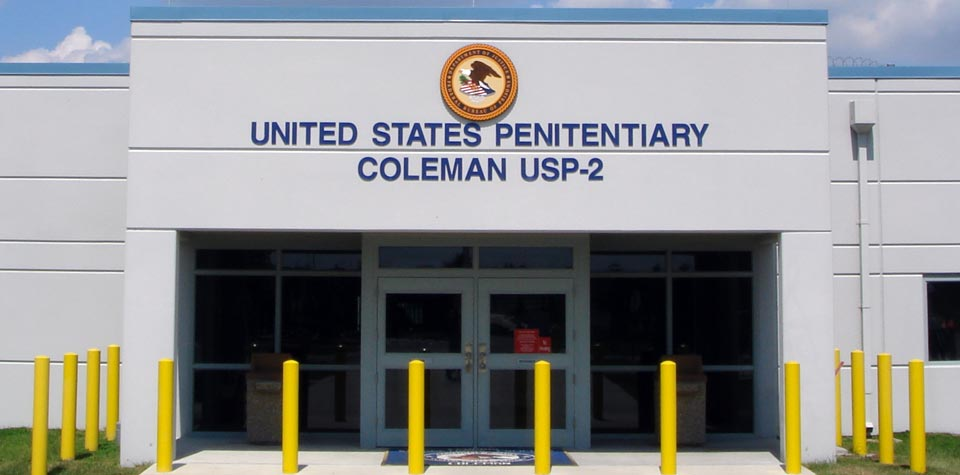
- USP Coleman I USP Coleman II

- Location within Florida
- Location: Sumter County, near Wildwood, Florida; 28°45′46″N 82°00′51″W
- Status: Operational
- Security class: High-security
- Population: 1,456 at USP Coleman I, 1,203 at USP Coleman II (September 2023)
- Opened: 2001
- Managed by: Federal Bureau of Prisons
- Warden: Bryan Antonelli (USP Coleman I), Roy Cheatam (USP Coleman II)

The United States Penitentiary, Coleman I and II (USP Coleman I and II) are high-security United States federal prisons for male inmates in Florida. It is part of the Coleman Federal Correctional Complex (FCC Coleman) and is operated by the Federal Bureau of Prisons, a division of the United States Department of Justice. USP Coleman I was opened in 2001, and in 2004 Clark Construction completed a 555,000-square-foot (51,600 m^{2}) additional component for USP Coleman II.

FCC Coleman is located in Central Florida, approximately 50 miles (80 km) northwest of Orlando, 60 miles (97 km) northeast of Tampa, and 35 miles (56 km) south of Ocala.

== United States Penitentiary, Coleman 1 ==
USP Coleman 1 is a high security federal lockup that houses several notorious and infamous criminals. Inmates at this facility consist of dozens of international terrorists, high-profile drug and arms dealers and other serial and repeat offenders. Inmates housed here report extreme violence at this facility. Former inmates also report frequent lockdowns at this facility, due to the level of violence.

== United States Penitentiary, Coleman 2 ==
Former prisoner Nate A. Lindell wrote that USP Coleman II is "a so-called special-needs prison—a 'safe' facility where informants, former cops, ex-gang members, check-ins (prisoners who intentionally put themselves in solitary confinement to be safe), homosexuals, and sex offenders can all, supposedly, walk the Yard freely. At regular BOP lockups, these types of men are in danger of being beaten, stabbed, or killed." The Marshall Project stated that "Coleman II did not respond to multiple requests for confirmation". However, in July 2023, convicted sex offender Larry Nassar, serving a life sentence at the facility, was stabbed 10 times, leading to his transfer to another federal prison soon after.

== Notable incidents ==
=== Killing of Dwayne Tottleben ===
On October 10, 2025, 33-year-old Wood River, Illinois resident Dwayne S. Tottleben was fatally shot by federal officers on the recreation yard, inside USP Coleman 1. Dwayne was serving a 15-year sentence for a methamphetamine charge with intent to distribute stemming from a 2020 traffic stop in St. Louis, Missouri. The prison sent a statement to NBC News indicating that the facility was placed on enhanced modified operations on the day of his death.

== Notable inmates (current and former) ==
†The Sentencing Reform Act of 1984 eliminated parole for most federal inmates. However, inmates sentenced for offenses committed prior to 1987 are eligible for parole consideration.

=== Financial crimes ===
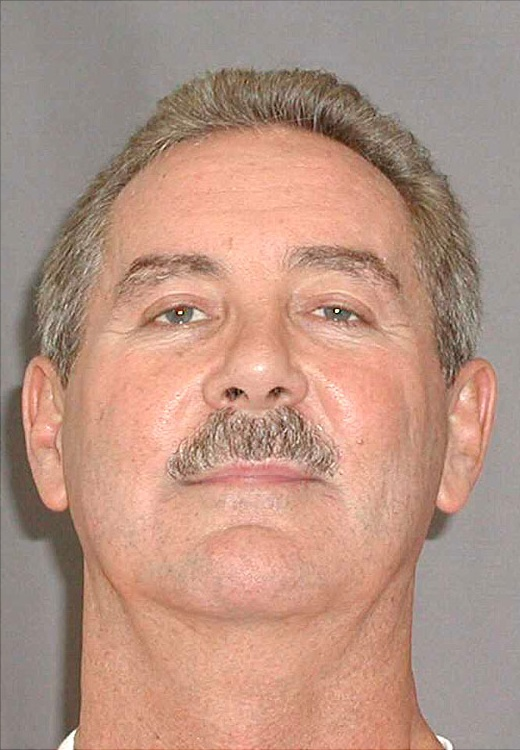
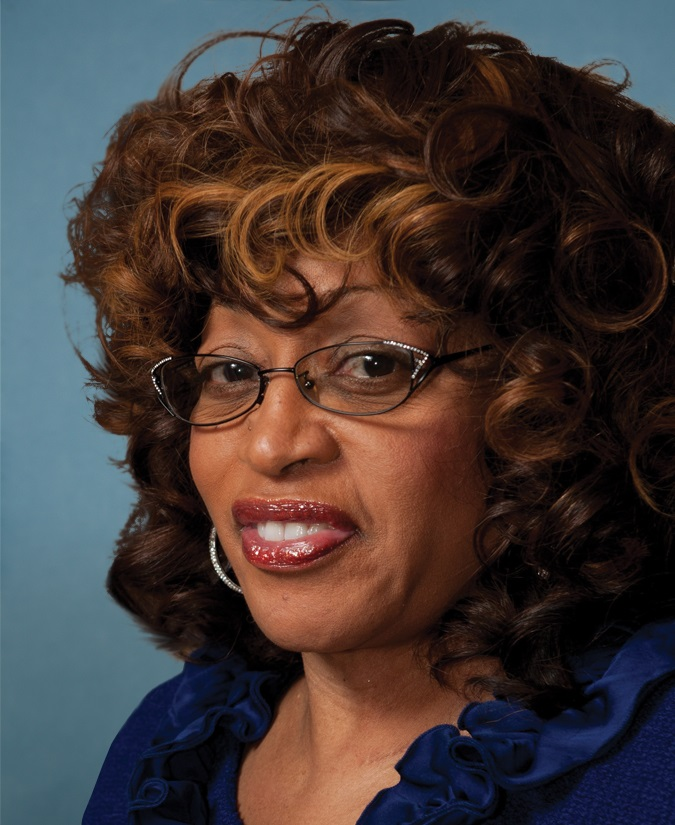
Inmate Name	Register Number	Photo	Status	Details
Allen Stanford	35017-183		Serving 110 years under his actual name, Robert Allen Stanford. Scheduled release in 2103.	Owner of the now-defunct Stanford Financial Group; convicted in 2012 of 17 charges, including fraud, money laundering and masterminding a Ponzi scheme which defrauded thousands of investors of over $7 billion; the story was featured on the CNBC television program American Greed.
Corrine Brown	67315-018		Released from prison on April 22, 2020, citing health concerns.	Democratic member of the House of Representatives; convicted in 2017 of 18 charges related to running a fraudulent charity, embezzling more than $300,000 for personal use.
Jason Woodcock	17975-043	Mugshot of Jason Woodcock	Released to Dismas Charities halfway house July 14th, 2023. No longer in BOP custody as of May 24th, 2024.	"Owner" of the fictitious company "Gulf South Seafood". Arrested for defrauding the Gulf Coast Claims Facility in relation to the Deepwater Horizon spill using his fictitious company. Sparked media debate about the fairness of his 120 month sentence.

=== Terrorists ===
Inmate Name	Register Number	Photo	Status	Details
Ahmed Ajaj	40637-053		Transferred to USP Victorville Serving an 84-year sentence; scheduled for release in 2091.	Convicted of participating in the 1993 World Trade Center bombing.
Nidal Ayyad	16917-050		Serving an 86-year sentence. Scheduled for release in 2067.	Sentenced for his involvement in the 1993 World Trade Center bombing.
Amine El Khalifi	79748-083		Serving a 30-year sentence; scheduled for release in 2037. Currently at FCI Williamsburg.	Al-Qaeda supporter; pleaded guilty in June 2012 to attempted use of a weapon of mass destruction for plotting to conduct a suicide bombing at the US Capitol Building in Washington, DC in February 2012.
Hysen Sherifi	51768–056		Serving a life sentence.	Convicted for being part of the Raleigh jihad group.
David Oquendo-Rivas	34348–069		Serving a life sentence.	Convicted in 2013 for the 2009 Sabana Seca massacre
Mohammed Odeh	42375–054		Serving a life sentence.	Participated in the 1998 United States embassy bombings

=== Others ===
Inmate Name	Register Number	Photo	Status	Details
Randy Lanier	04961-069		Released in 2015; served 26 years.	Racecar driver, 1984 IMSA Camel GT champion and 1986 Indy 500 Rookie of the Year; convicted in 1988 of directing a drug operation that brought more than 600,000 pounds of marijuana into the United States from Colombia between 1982 and 1986.
Nicholas Slatten	16018-081		Granted a full presidential pardon by U.S. President Donald Trump after receiving a life sentence.	Former Blackwater security guard, convicted of murder in 2014 for his role in the Nisour Square massacre.
Mahdi Jama Mohamed	77985-083		Deceased. Died on August 22, 2023, while scheduled for release in 2041.	Sentenced for his involvement in the SY quest hijacking that resulted in the deaths of four American citizens.
Brendt Christensen	22127-026		Serving a life sentence plus ten years.	Kidnapped, raped, and murdered Chinese scholar Yingying Zhang at the University of Illinois at Urbana–Champaign.
Larry Nassar	21504-040		Serving a 60-year federal sentence; now at USP Lewisburg.	Former USA Gymnastics team physician, and Michigan State University professor and clinician, pleaded guilty to federal charges relating to the possession of thousands of items of child pornography. Also pleaded guilty to sexually assaulting hundreds of underage girls countless times over decades. On 9 July 2023, Nassar was stabbed multiple times by another inmate but survived.
George Martorano	12973-004		Sentenced to life without the possibility of parole. Released on October 5, 2015, after serving 32 years.	Was the longest-serving first-time non-violent offender in the Federal Bureau of Prisons at the time of his release. Wrote 31 books while in prison.
Scott Lee Kimball	14444-006		Scheduled release date in 2082. Currently at USP Florence High.	Serial killer sentenced to 70 years in Colorado state prison in 2009 for financial crimes and four murders committed while he was an FBI informant. Suspected of having committed additional murders. Convicted of attempted escape in 2020 after a prisoner he was plotting with three years earlier informed the FBI; transferred from state to federal custody in 2021 for unknown reasons.
Paul Anthony Ciancia	67089-112		Transferred to FCI Atlanta. Serving a life sentence plus 60 years.	Pleaded guilty in 2016 for the 2013 LAX Shooting.
Luke Sommer	38474-086		Scheduled release date in 2034. Transferred to FCI Fairton.	Former US Army Ranger; pleaded guilty to bank robbery in 2008 for masterminding the takeover robbery of a bank in Tacoma, Washington; pleaded guilty in 2010 to attempting to solicit the murder of an Assistant United States Attorney.
Auburn Calloway	14601-076		Serving a life sentence.	Attempted to hijack and crash Federal Express Flight 705 as a deadheading passenger. Convicted of attempted air piracy and interference of flight crew operations and given two consecutive life sentences, reduced to one following appeal.
Leonard Peltier	89637-132		Served two life sentences plus seven years for an armed escape from USP Lompoc. Commuted to indefinite house arrest by President Joe Biden on January 19, 2025, effective Feb, 18.	Member of the American Indian Movement, a Native American activist group; convicted in a contested trial in 1977 of murdering FBI Agents Jack R. Coler and Ronald A. Williams during a shootout at Pine Ridge Indian Reservation in 1975.

== See also ==
- List of United States federal prisons
- Federal Bureau of Prisons
- Incarceration in the United States
