= List of unsuccessful terrorist plots in the United States post-9/11 =

After the initiation of the global war on terrorism following the September 11 attacks in 2001, several terrorist plots aimed at civilian and military targets have failed to succeed. Several Trump administration officials assert that several such terrorism plots were created by the United States Federal Bureau of Investigation, with agents providing plans, materials, and encouragement to the supposed "terrorists" — often mentally unstable individuals, small-time criminals, and other vulnerable targets — and then arresting them on terrorism charges.

== 2001 to 2009 ==
Date	Target	Description	Location of arrest or attempt	Suspect(s)	Status	Incarceration (current and former)
December 22, 2001	American Airlines Flight 63	A man from London was put into custody after attempting to detonate a shoe bomb.	Paris to Miami	Richard Reid	Serving a life sentence without parole	ADX Florence
March 2002	Police officers and authorities	David Earl Burgert Jr., a 38-year-old Ohio native, was arrested in March 2002 and charged in federal court after amassing a stockpile of weapons to arm a militia called "Project 7" that he had planned to use to overpower local law enforcement and overthrow the government. After serving eight years in a federal prison on weapons charges, Burgert Jr. was involved in an attack against Missoula County Sheriff's Deputies on June 12, 2011. He fled into the wooded area between the states of Montana and Idaho and remains at large.	Various locations in Montana	David Earl Burgert Jr.	Remains on the run as a fugitive	
May 8, 2002	Unknown	A man was arrested after returning from Pakistan for allegedly attempting to build a dirty bomb.	Chicago, Illinois	José Padilla	Sentenced to 17 years in prison, but this changed to 21 years in 2014.	ADX Florence
September 3, 2002	Police officers and authorities	An Idaho Mountain Militia Boys militant plot to kill a judge and a police officer and break a friend out of jail is uncovered. Richard Raugust ended up releasing from prison in December 4 of 2015.	Idaho	Larry Eugene Raugust	Served his sentence	
March 13, 2003	Brooklyn Bridge	A man was arrested and accused of giving aid to al-Qaeda and attempting to destroy the Brooklyn Bridge	Columbus, Ohio	Iyman Faris	Sentenced to 20 years in prison	USP Marion (Released in August 2020)
June 2003	Unknown	Eleven members of the Virginia Jihad Network were arrested and accused of training for holy war around the globe.	Northern Virginia	Ali al-Tamimi, Ali Asad Chandia, et al.	All sentenced to 20 or less years in prison	ADX Florence (al-Tamini); FCI Terre Haute (Chandia)
November 28, 2003	Shopping Mall in Columbus, Ohio.	A man was arrested for planning to detonate a bomb in an Ohio shopping centre in what is known as the 2002 Columbus, Ohio shopping mall bombing plot.	Columbus, Ohio	Nuradin M. Abdi	Sentenced in 2007 to 10 years.	
August 2004	New York Stock Exchange, World Bank, International Monetary Fund, Citigroup Center, World Bank, and several London hotels	Security in the United States was put on high alert after a plot to destroy the New York Stock Exchange and other financial institutions in New Jersey and Washington surfaces.	United Kingdom and New York City, New York	Dhiren Barot	Sentenced to life in prison	HM Prison Frankland
August 28, 2004	34th Street-Herald Square subway station	Two men were arrested after attempting to bomb the New York City Subway on the day before the 2004 Republican National Convention	New York City, New York	Shahawar Matin Siraj and James Elshafay	Sentenced to 30 years in prison	FCI Ashland (Siraj)
August 2004	Pakistani diplomat	Two men were arrested at an Albany mosque after attempting to gain possession of a shoulder-fired grenade launcher to assassinate a Pakistani diplomat.	Albany, New York	Yassin Aref and Mohammed Hossain	Both sentenced to 15 years in prison	
August 2005	Los Angeles-area U.S. Armed Forces bases, synagogues and other places	Four men running an Islamic prison gang were arrested after allegedly attempting to destroy Los Angeles-area places.	Los Angeles, California	Kevin James, et al.	James sentenced to 16 years in prison	
December 2005	Williams Natural Gas (Wyoming), Transcontinental Pipeline, Standard Oil refinery	A man was arrested on suspicion that he had plans to destroy several sites.	Wilkes-Barre, Pennsylvania	Michael Curtis Reynolds	Sentenced to 30 years in prison	FCI Schuylkill
February 2006	Troops in Iraq, Toledo, Ohio citizens	Three men were arrested for allegedly planning to build bombs for use by terrorists in Iraq.	Toledo, Ohio	Mohammad Zaki Amawi, et al.	Amawi was sentenced to 20 years in prison, the others 13 and 8 years, respectively.	USP Marion (Amawi, later transferred to FCI Lewisburg)
April 2006	Washington D.C.-area buildings	Two men from Georgia were arrested after videotaping Washington-area buildings and sending the tapes to a London-based jihadist website.	Toronto, Ontario	Syed Haris Ahmed and Ehsanul Islam Sadequee	Ahmed sentenced to 13 years in prison, Sadequee sentenced to 17.	
June 2006	Sears Tower and FBI offices	Seven men were arrested after allegedly plotting to bomb Sears Tower and FBI offices.	Miami, Florida, Atlanta, Georgia	Narseal Batiste, et al.	Five of the men were convicted. Batiste was sentenced to 13 years in prison.	
July 2006	PATH tunnels Financial District	A man was arrested after allegedly attempting to bomb New York and New Jersey subway tunnels and flood the Financial District.	New York, New York	Assem Hammoud		
December 2006	Cherryvale Mall	Derrick Shareef was charged after trying to trade stereo speakers for hand grenades and a handgun as part of a plan to terrorize shoppers at Cherryvale Mall in Rockford, Illinois during the holiday season.	Rockford, Illinois	Derrick Shareef	Shareef sentenced to life imprisonment	FCI Milan
May 7, 2007	Fort Dix	Six men were arrested after attempting an attack on the Fort Dix military base.	Fort Dix, New Jersey	Dritan Duka, Eljvir Duka, Shain Duka, Serdar Tatar, and Mohamad Shnewer.	Four of the men received life sentences, one man received five years in prison and the other received 33	FCI Terre Haute (Dritan); USP Hazelton (Eljvir); USP Atwater (Shain); USP Terre Haute (Shnewer)
June 3, 2007	John F. Kennedy International Airport	Four men were arrested in New York after a plot is revealed to bomb the fuel line of JFK airport.	New York City, New York	Abdul Kadir, et al.	Kadir sentenced to life imprisonment.	
May 20, 2009	New York City synagogues/U.S. military aircraft	Four men were arrested in New York after a plot is revealed to blow up two synagogues and shoot down a U.S. military aircraft.	New York City, New York	James Cromitie, David Williams, Onta Williams, and Laguerre Payen		
July 27, 2009	Unspecified	Multiple men arrested for planning an attack.	Near Raleigh, North Carolina	Daniel Patrick Boyd, alongside seven other men	FCI Butner (Boyd); FCI Berlin (Yaghi); FCI Mendota (Subasic); USP Coleman I (Sherifi)	
September 19, 2009	New York City Subway	Zazi, a native of Afghanistan who lived in Colorado, was arrested and convicted of plotting to bomb the New York City Subway system. He was trained by al-Qaeda in Pakistan. 5 others were also indicted on related charges.	New York City, New York	Najibullah Zazi, alongside several other men	FCI Terre Haute (Medunjanin)	
September 24, 2009	Federal Building, Springfield, Illinois	A 29 year old was arrested on charges that he intended to bomb the Paul Findley Federal Building in Springfield, Illinois.	Springfield, Illinois	Michael Finton	FCI Yazoo City Low II	
September 24, 2009	Fountain Place	A 19-year-old was arrested on charges that he intended to bomb a downtown Dallas skyscraper. The suspect was sentenced to 24 years in prison in 2010.	Dallas, Texas	Hosam Maher Husein Smadi	USP Allenwood	
October 16, 2009	Various overseas targets	Colleen LaRose, also known as JihadJane and Fatima LaRose, is an American citizen charged with terrorism-related crimes, including conspiracy to commit murder and providing material support to terrorists. Lars Vilks was a named target in response to drawings of Muhammad.	Philadelphia, Pennsylvania	Colleen LaRose, et al.		
December 25, 2009	Northwest Airlines Flight 253	A 23-year-old man was arrested after Northwest Airlines passengers jumped him to avoid his detonating an explosive device above the city of Detroit. The explosive had been concealed in his underwear. He was convicted of eight federal criminal counts, including attempted use of a weapon of mass destruction and attempted mass murder. On February 16, 2012, he was sentenced to 4 life terms plus 50 years without parole.	Detroit, Michigan	Abdul Farouk Abdulmutallab	ADX Florence	

== 2010–2019 ==
Date	Target	Description	Location of arrest or attempt	Suspect(s)	Incarceration
May 1, 2010	Times Square	A Pakistani American who attempted the May 1, 2010 Times Square car bombing. He was arrested after he had boarded Emirates Flight 202 to Dubai. On June 21, 2010, in Federal District Court in Manhattan he confessed to 10 counts arising from the bombing attempt. He was sentenced to life imprisonment.	New York City, New York	Faisal Shahzad	ADX Florence
September 20, 2010	Wrigley Field	A man was arrested for putting a backpack he thought was filled with explosives at the baseball stadium. In 2013, he was sentenced to 23 years in prison.	Chicago, Illinois	Sami Samir Hassoun	
October 27, 2010	Arlington Cemetery station	A Pakistani-born Virginia man was arrested and accused of casing Washington-area subway stations in what he thought was an al-Qaeda plot to bomb and kill commuters.	Arlington, Virginia	Farooque Ahmed	FCI Allenwood Medium
November 26, 2010	Pioneer Courthouse Square	A Somalian-American attempted to light what he thought was a bomb at the public square in what is known as the 2010 Portland car bomb plot.	Portland, Oregon	Mohamed Osman Mohamud	
February 25, 2011	Former President George W. Bush and his Dallas, Texas residence	A 20-year-old Saudi Arabian national and resident was arrested in his home in Lubbock, Texas, for planning to carry out a bomb attack in the residence of former President George W. Bush and his Dallas home. In November 2012, he was sentenced to life in prison.	Lubbock, Texas	Khalid Ali-M Aldawsari	USP Pollock
May 12, 2011	A synagogue and the Empire State Building in New York City	In what is known as the 2011 Manhattan terrorism plot, two men were arrested after planning an attack in multiple locations in New York City. In 2013, one of the men was sentenced to 10 years in prison, while the other one was sentenced to 5 years.	New York City	Ahmed Ferhani, Mohamed Mamadouh	
September 28, 2011	The Pentagon and United States Capitol	Rezwan Ferdaus, a U.S. citizen of Bangladeshi descent born and raised in Massachusetts, was arrested on September 28, 2011, for allegedly plotting to attack The Pentagon and United States Capitol with remote-controlled model aircraft carrying explosives. He was also charged for assembling IED detonators to be used in al-Qaeda plots to attack U.S. soldiers abroad.	Arlington, Virginia; Washington, D.C.	Rezwan Ferdaus	FCI Ray Brook
January 7, 2012	Tampa and various other targets	Sami Osmakac is a man who allegedly plotted an attack, to avenge what he felt were wrongs done to Muslims, in the area around Tampa, Florida. Osmakac, an Albanian from Kosovo and a naturalized US citizen, was arrested January 7, 2012, for the alleged attack plan, which involved bombing nightclubs, detonating a car bomb, using an assault rifle, wearing an explosive belt in a crowded area, and taking hostages.	Tampa, Florida	Sami Osmakac	FMC Rochester
February 17, 2012	United States Capitol	A Moroccan man who was arrested by the FBI for allegedly plotting to carry out a suicide bombing on the United States Capitol. El Khalifi thought he was working with al-Qaeda operatives, but was in contact with undercover FBI agents. He was sentenced to prison for 30 years in September 2012.	Washington, D.C.	Amine El Khalifi	FMC Butner
May 19, 2012	2012 Chicago summit	Three men were arrested after a raid an apartment, seized pipe bomb instructions, an improvised mortar made of PVC piping, a crossbow, knives, Shurikens, a map of Chicago and four fire bombs, authorities confirmed. On April 25, 2014, the three men were sentenced to eight to five years in prison, considerably reducing initial penalties of up to thirty years.	Chicago	Brian Jacob Church, Brent Betterly, and Jared Chase	
October 17, 2012	Federal Reserve Bank of New York	A Bangladeshi man was charged with trying to blow up the Federal Reserve building in New York. While Nafis believed he had the blessing of al-Qaeda and was acting on behalf of the terrorist group, he has no known ties, according to federal officials. In 2013, the individual was sentenced to 30 years in prison.	New York City, New York	Quazi Mohammad Rezwanul Ahsan Nafis	FCI Big Spring
April 2013	Times Square	After the Tsarnaev brothers successfully carried out the Boston Marathon bombing, they planned to use leftover explosives to terrorize Times Square in New York City, but after carjacking Dun Meng, a Chinese graduate student, the plot was foiled after he escaped and called the police leading them to the Tsarnaev's location. A shootout ensued resulting in the death of Tamerlan. Dzhokhar was captured later that day after a citywide manhunt was declared to pin down his exact location.	Watertown, Massachusetts	Dzhokhar and Tamerlan Tsarnaev	ADX Florence (Dzhokhar)
May 3, 2013	Attempted assault, attempted bombing	Buford "Bucky" Rogers was arrested after a large cache of firearms, molotov cocktails, and other explosive devices were found during a raid conducted by the FBI and local law enforcement. According to authorities, the family of Rogers (known by local authorities for his anti-government beliefs) formed the "Black Snake Militia", a tiny militia which plotted blowing up the Montevideo police station, raiding an armory belonged to the National Guard, and cutting off the communications of the county seat. Rogers was subsequently sentenced to three years and four months of imprisonment on the charges of illegal possession of firearms and explosive material.	Montevideo, Minnesota	Buford Rogers	
January 2014	Mosques, an Islamic school, the White House	Glendon Scott Crawford and Eric J. Feight, of Galway, New York, were arrested in January 2014 for attempting to construct a remote control radiation-emitting device to be used to attack a number of targets. Crawford and Feight were to use the machine to attack Mosques, Islamic schools, and to kill then U.S. President Barack Obama. Feight received an 8-year federal prison sentence and was released in 2020. Crawford was sentenced to 30 years in federal prison and is scheduled for release in 2038.	Galway, New York	Eric Feight, Glendon Scott Crawford	ADX Florence (Crawford)
March 14, 2014	Attempted theft of a stock car, banks and attack government buildings and kill law enforcement officers	A man from Katy, Texas was arrested after a nearly eight-month operation by the FBI, Secret Service, Houston Police, and Harris Sheriff's Office. The investigation began after the creation of a Facebook page called "American Insurgent Movement", with the aim of recruiting five or six persons to aid in the theft of a stock car, and start a ring of attacks against government buildings and law enforcement in the Greater Houston zone.	Katy, Texas	Robert James Talbot Jr	
January 16, 2015	United States Capitol	A 22-year-old Green Township, Hamilton County, Ohio man inspired by ISIS planned to attack the government building by launching pipe bombs and then shoot anyone fleeing the carnage. In 2016, he was sentenced to 30 years in prison.	Ohio	Christopher Cornell	FCI Cumberland
February 14, 2015	Courthouse, bank, forest festival, first responders	A local West Virginia man had stockpiled C-4, dynamite, and other weapons (including a sniper rifle to target first responders) to allegedly attack a federal courthouse, a bank, and the Mountain State Forest Festival in Elkins.	Elkins, West Virginia	Jonathan Leo Schrader	
April 2015	New York City	A plot to build a pressure cooker bomb in New York City was arranged by Asia Siddiqui, a Pakistani American, and Noelle Velentzas. Siddiqui was in contact with Al Qaeda in the Arabian Peninsula, while Velentzas seemed to support the Islamic State in Iraq and the Levant (ISIS). The two had researched bomb-making and purchased bomb making materials but were arrested before they selected a target. The women were arrested on April 2, 2015. According to the complaint, officers found "three propane gas tanks, soldering tools, pipes, a pressure cooker, fertilizer, flux, detailed handwritten notes on the recipes for bomb making, and extensive jihadist literature" at Siddiqui's apartment. Velentzas had information on creating bombs from propane tanks and a picture of Osama bin Laden. Velentzas also questioned why people would travel to Syria when there were ways of "pleasing Allah" in the United States. The two had been roommates until shortly before their arrest. Their plot was exposed by an undercover agent posing as a third conspirator. In 2020, Siddiqui was sentenced to 15 years in prison, while Velentzas was sentenced to 16 years the following year.	New York City	Asia Siddiqui, Noelle Velentzas	FCI Aliceville (Siddiqui); FCI Waseca (Velentzas)
June 2015	New York City	Three men from Queens, New York, Fort Lee, New Jersey, and Staten Island, New York had sought to detonate a pressure cooker bomb in support of the Islamic State of Iraq and the Levant.	Queens, New York	Munther Omar Saleh, Samuel Rahamin Topaz, Fareed Mumuni	USP Atwater (Saleh); FCI Berlin (Mumuni)
August 2015	Muslim civilians	A jury returned their verdict in federal court convicting Glendon Scott Crawford (a member of the Loyal White Knights of the Ku Klux Klan) of Galway, New York for plotting to kill Muslims and President Barack Obama with a self-made radiation weapon. In December 2016, Crawford was sentenced to 30 years in prison and lifetime supervised release after being found guilty on charges of conspiracy to use a weapon of mass destruction and distributing information relating to weapons of mass destruction. His arrest came after he was reported by members of two local synagogues whom Crawford had approached to fund and plan his attack. He is the first US citizen to be found guilty of attempting to build and use a radiological dispersal device.	New York	Glendon Scott Crawford	
September 11, 2015	9/11 Memorial event in Kansas City, Missouri	A Jewish American man, Joshua Ryne Goldberg, posing as an Australian ISIS supporter, attempted to get an FBI confidential informant to detonate a bomb at a Kansas City, Missouri September 11 attacks memorial event. Goldberg attempted to persuade the confidential informant to coat the shrapnel of the bomb in rat poison in order to maximize casualties. On December 20, 2017, Goldberg pleaded guilty to attempted malicious damage and destruction by an explosive of a building.	Orange Park, Florida	Joshua Ryne Goldberg	
April 2016	Aventura Turnberry Jewish Center in Aventura, Florida	A man was arrested on May 2, 2016 for planning to bomb a Jewish center in Florida. He was sentenced to 25 years in prison in 2017.	Hollywood, Florida	James Gonzalo Medina	USP Victorville
July 2016	Thousands of Men and Boys	In July 2016, a 33-year-old woman recorded and uploaded a six-minute controversial video on her YouTube channel, telling all women with inflammatory words to kill all men and boys. The video itself with over 200,000 views sparked major outrage over her speech aiming directly towards misandrists, and the video was deleted a few months later. In a January 2017 comment released from McDermott, she replied that she was "just joking", but her social media has a long history of making other controversial videos as well as posts with the hashtag "#KillAllMen", and has had her older YouTube channels terminated in the past.	Unknown	Jenny McDermott	
September 17–19, 2016	2016 New York and New Jersey bombings	On the morning of September 17, a pipe bomb exploded in Seaside Park, New Jersey. Later that day, a homemade pressure cooker bomb went off in the Chelsea neighborhood of Manhattan, New York City. A second pressure cooker bomb was discovered four blocks away. Suspect Ahmad Khan Rahimi was not part of a terrorist group, but his actions were believed to have been influenced by the extremist Islamic ideology.	New York, New Jersey	Ahmad Khan Rahimi	ADX Florence
October 14, 2016	Mosque and apartment complex in Garden City, Kansas.	Three individuals who called themselves "The Crusaders," were arrested after plotting to murder Somalian immigrants. All three men were sentenced to at least 25 years in prison in 2019.	Wichita, Kansas	Patrick Eugene Stein, Curtis Wayne Allen, Gavin Wright.	FCI Pekin (Stein); FCI Forrest City Medium (Allen); FCI Beaumont Medium (Wright)
December 4, 2016	Comet Ping Pong in Washington, D.C.	A man from North Carolina who believed in the Pizzagate conspiracy theory opened fire inside a restaurant because he wanted to save children he believed were trapped in the building's basement by political elites. No one was injured or killed, and he was sentenced to 4 years in prison.	Washington, D.C.	Edgar Maddison Welch	
December 27, 2016	Jefferson, Iowa Law Enforcement Center Carroll, Iowa	A Jefferson, Iowa man was tracked by an undercover operative while planning a joint "suicide by cop" attack with his wife, Joey Goodwin against the Greene County Law Enforcement Center in Jefferson, Iowa. This facility housed both the County Sheriff's Department and the local Police. The two had faced various felony burglary-related charges and, according to the informant, were "not going to prison under any circumstances." Tyson Ruth of Jefferson, Iowa, had compiled a vast array of weapons including an illegal-in-Iowa automatic rifle, tens of thousands of rounds of ammunition, explosives and had been propagating the growth of bacteria that cause anthrax and botulism. The couple had planned a biological attack on various civilian installations including public schools and the local hospital. At the time of initial arrest, some but not all of the weapons, ammunition, bacteria, explosives and two full Kevlar® body suits were confiscated as evidence. The informant was unsatisfied with the extremely light-handed charges for which the Carroll County Attorney, John Werden sought conviction, so he contacted Greene County Law Enforcement directly asking that Federal Agents be brought in to investigate. A secondary search warrant was executed by divisions of the Iowa Department of Criminal Investigation and the FBI/JTTF and the entirety of evidence was secured. Ruth was charged and then convicted on federal weapons charges.	Carroll, Iowa	Tyson Ruth, Joey Goodwin	
August 12, 2017	BancFirst in Oklahoma City, Oklahoma	A 26-year-old man from Sayre, Oklahoma, tried to detonate a bomb near a bank in downtown Oklahoma City when the van actually contained fake explosives set up by law enforcement. In 2020, he was sentenced to 25 years in prison.	Oklahoma City	Jerry Drake Varnell	FCI Marianna
October 22, 2017	Amtrak train and African Americans	While an Amtrak California Zephyr train was traveling through Nebraska, a 22-year-old man from St. Charles, Missouri trespassed into a forbidden section and activated the emergency brakes. In 2018, he was sentenced to 14 years in prison.	Furnas County, Nebraska	Taylor Michael Wilson	FCI Thomson
December 4, 2017	Islamic Center of Northeast Florida in Jacksonville	A 69-year-old local man was arrested for planning a shooting at a mosque. He was sentenced to 5 years in 2018.	Jacksonville, Florida	Bernardino (Bernandino) Gawala Bolatete	
December 20, 2017	San Francisco, California Pier 39	Former U.S. Marine from Modesto, California, arrested for plotting a Christmas terrorist attack at San Francisco's very popular Pier 39 on behalf of ISIS. He planned to strategically bomb the pier to funnel people into a crowd, then begin with a mass shooting. The FBI stopped his plan after attention was brought to his pro-ISIS Facebook posts. Fall 2017, he was caught communicating with undercover FBI agents posing as ISIS recruiters, saying he was "wholehearted committed to the cause" and could provide "U.S. military resource" along with money to ISIS.	Modesto, California	Everitt Aaron Jameson	FCI Sheridan
July 2, 2018	Multiple locations in Cleveland, Ohio	A 48-year-old man of Maple Heights, Ohio who harbored sympathetic views to Al-Qaeda was arrested due to his plans to set off explosives at an Independence Day celebration. He was sentenced to 14 years in prison in 2020.	Cleveland, Ohio	Demetrius Nathaniel Pitts (Abdur Raheem Rafeeq)	USP Marion
December 10, 2018	Jewish synagogue in Ohio	An ISIS supporter named Damon M. Joseph of Holland, Ohio is arrested for attempting an attack on a synagogue. Joseph was inspired by the Pittsburgh synagogue shooting perpetrator Robert Bowers and told the police that he admired him and wished to carry out an attack similar to Bowers. In 2021, Joseph was sentenced to 20 years in prison.	Toledo, Ohio	Damon M. Joseph	FCI McKean
December 10, 2018	Toledo bar	Toledo residents Elizabeth Lecron and Vincent Armstrong were arrested for plotting an "upscale mass murder" at a bar in Toledo using explosives. Elizabeth Lecron had been a fan of Charleston church shooting assailant Dylann Roof having been in active correspondence with him and sending him a book about Belgian Waffen-SS Nazi leader Léon Degrelle. Lecron had already created a Tumblr page celebrating the church shooting in Charleston titled "charlestonchurchmiracle" as well as various other murderers. The two would be indicted on January 3, 2019. In November, 2019, Lecron was sentenced to 15 years in prison, while Armstrong was sentenced to 6 years the following month.	Toledo, Ohio	Elizabeth Lecron and Vincent Armstrong	FCI Hazelton (Lecron)
February 20, 2019	Democratic, left-wing and socialist politicians, media personalities, and organizations	A U.S. Coast Guard lieutenant from Silver Spring, Maryland, Christopher Paul Hasson, arrested for unlawful firearm possession and drug charges. Prosecutors say Hasson followed the manifesto of Norwegian terrorist Anders Behring Breivik. Federal agents recovered 15 firearms and more than 1,000 rounds of ammunition from Hasson's Silver Spring apartment, and they said he had been stockpiling weapons and ammunition since 2017. Hasson was a self-proclaimed white nationalist and neo-Nazi skinhead who was inspired by terrorist Anders Behring Breivik the 2011 Norway attacks perpetrator and supported turning the Pacific Northwest into an all-white homeland and sent a letter to Harold Covington of the Northwest Front, and had compiled an extensive 'hit list' targeting various Democratic and left-leaning politicians, lawmakers, media personalities, as well as journalists working for CNN and MSNBC and the organizations Democratic Socialists of America and Social Democrats, USA. According to email documents, Hasson planned "biological attacks followed by attack [sic] on food supply", and a "bombing/sniper campaign".	Silver Spring, Maryland	Christopher Paul Hasson	FCI Butner Medium
April 29, 2019	White nationalist rally, Jews, Churches, Police officers and the Santa Monica Pier	A U.S. Army veteran from Reseda, California with ties to ISIS was planning to bomb a white nationalist rally held by the United Patriot National Front (UPNF) in retribution for the Christchurch mosque shootings in Christchurch, New Zealand. He was also planning attacks on Jews, churches, police officers and the Santa Monica Pier. In 2021, he was sentenced to 25 years in prison.	Long Beach, California and Los Angeles, California	Mark Domingo	FCI Pekin
June 7, 2019	Times Square, New York City	Authorities arrested Ashiqul Alam of Brooklyn, who planned to attack Times Square in New York City, New York with grenades, guns and a suicide vest.	New York City, New York	Ashiqul Alam	
June 20, 2019	Church in Pittsburgh, Pennsylvania	An individual who came as a refugee from Syria in 2016 was arrested due to planning to bomb a church in support of the terrorist group ISIS. He was sentenced in 2022 to 17 years in prison.	Pittsburgh, Pennsylvania	Mustafa Alowemer	FCI Allenwood Medium
August 9, 2019	Synagogue and LGBT bar in Las Vegas, Nevada	A 23-year-old local individual was charged with planning to bomb a synagogue and LGBT themed bar. In 2020, he was sentenced to 2 years in prison.	Las Vegas, Nevada	Conor Climo	
November 1, 2019	Temple Emanuel	A 27-year-old white supremacist was arrested in a plot to bomb a historical synagogue in a Colorado town. The suspect pled guilty to a federal hate crime in October 2020. In 2021, he was sentenced to 19 years in federal prison.	Pueblo, Colorado	Richard Holzer	FTC Oklahoma City

== 2020–present ==
Date	Target	Description	Location of arrest or attempt	Suspect(s)	Incarceration
June 3, 2020	BLM protests in Las Vegas, Nevada	Three men who were part of the Boogaloo movement were arrested. Their plan was to use Molotov cocktails to instigate violence at ongoing protests following the murder of George Floyd. On July 30, 2020, one of the men was charged with child sexual exploitation. He was convicted of both the exploitation and terrorism charges in 2023, which amounted to life in prison plus 33 years.	Las Vegas, Nevada	Stephen Parshall, Andrew Lynam, William Loomis	
August 2020	Power stations in America	In August 2020, three individuals, all from different locations: Columbus, Ohio, West Lafayette, Indiana, and Katy, Texas were investigated by the FBI. The goal was to attack power grids around America in the hopes of inciting a race war and economic collapse.	Multiple locations across America	Jonathan Allen Frost, Christopher Brenner Cook, Jackson Matthew Sawall	FCI Bastrop (Frost); FCI Bennettsville (Cook)
October 8, 2020	Gretchen Whitmer, Michigan State Capitol, Michigan State Police	The Federal Bureau of Investigation arrested 13 members of the Wolverine Watchmen militia, who plotted to kidnap Gretchen Whitmer, the Governor of Michigan. The plot was foiled by FBI informants in-person and online who had been reporting since March 2020. The capitol building of Michigan and the Michigan State Police were also targeted by the conspirators for acts of violence.	Michigan	13 Wolverine Watchmen militia members	
April 9, 2021	Amazon's data center in Ashburn, Virginia	A 28-year-old man from Wichita Falls, Texas, wanted to destroy the data storage place of the company in hopes of bringing parts of the internet down. Later in 2021, he was sentenced to 10 years in federal prison.	Fort Worth, Texas	Seth Aaron Pendley	FCI Terre Haute
May 30, 2021	A Walmart in Texas	A 28-year-old Kerrville man was arrested after making threats and planning a mass shooting. In May 2024, he was sentenced to 5 years in federal prison.	Kerrville, Texas	Coleman Thomas Blevins	FCI Butner
July 21, 2021	Women	A 21-year-old local man was who was a self-identified "incel" was arrested for planning to massacre thousands of women in Ohio. In February 2024, he was sentenced to 6 years and 8 months in federal prison.	Hillsboro, Ohio	Tres Genco	FCI Beckley
September 13, 2022	Democrats	A 61-year-old local man walked into a local Dairy Queen with a rainbow clown wig on his head stating that he wanted to kill "all Democrats" and was arrested without harming anyone.	Delmont, Pennsylvania	Jan Stawovy	
December 2022-January 2023	People affiliated with the Democratic Party of New Mexico	A failed candidate of the 2022 New Mexico House of Representatives election believed his loss was due to voter fraud, and ordered people on his behalf to shoot at politicians' homes. Despite property damage, no one was harmed, but the bullets caused dust to land on the 10-year-old daughter of one of the targets.	Albuquerque, New Mexico	Jose Louis Trujillo, Solomon Peña	
June 18, 2023	Synagogue in East Lansing, Michigan	A 19-year-old man from Pickford, Michigan, was charged after planning to attack a synagogue. He was sentenced to 366 days in prison in 2024.	Pickford, Michigan	Seann Patrick Pietila	
October 5, 2023	Wisconsin Governor Tony Evers	A 43-year-old local man showed up to the State Legislature with a handgun demanding to see the governor, and was arrested, only to return later in the day with an assault rifle, in which he was arrested again, with nobody being harmed in both incidents.	Wisconsin State Capitol in Madison, Wisconsin	Joshua Pleasnick	
January 2, 2024	Colorado Supreme Court	A 44-year-old local man with a decades-long extensive criminal history broke into the building that houses the Colorado Supreme Court and was arrested with no one being injured. In 2025, Olsen plead guilty to arson charges related to damage he caused in the Colorado Supreme Court building.	Ralph L. Carr Colorado Judicial Center in Denver, Colorado	Brandon Olsen	
May 13, 2024	White People in New Jersey	A 23-year-old former black Marine from Trenton, New Jersey, was arrested and accused of threatening to kill white people and carry out a mass shooting in his home state. Shortly before joining the Marines, he posted a comment on his Facebook account on December 17, 2022, saying, "I want to cause mayhem on the white community" and "I want to erase them," according to federal prosecutors. His plan that was scheduled in 2023 immediately failed when he joined the Marines. He mentioned what he called the ongoing current struggles of young men and boys across the United States, and he wrote that they "have so many obstacles stacked against us we cannot excel no matter how hard we try." Interviewed by the FBI at the Marine base in Twentynine Palms, California, Cobb admitted the accounts on social media were his and told agents he continued to have homicidal ideations, according to the FBI affidavit. In January 2025, Cobb agreed to plead guilty on his admission to transmitting a post on the internet containing threats to injure members of the white community by shooting them with a firearm. He was sentenced to 15 months in federal prison.	Trenton, New Jersey	Joshua Cobb	
September 7, 2024	Jews in New York City	A 20-year-old Pakistani national from the Greater Toronto Area of Canada was arrested in Ormstown, Quebec by both FBI agents and the Royal Canadian Mounted Police, for attempting to provide material support and resources to a designated foreign terrorist organization. Two undercover officers later communicated with the man with encrypted messages about killing and slaughtering Jews in New York City in connection of the first anniversary of the October 7 attacks and the Jewish holiday of Yom Kippur.	Ormstown, Quebec	Muhammad Shahzeb Khan	
October 7, 2024	Unspecified	A 27-year-old Afghan national was arrested in his Oklahoma City, Oklahoma home for attempting to plan an Election Day attack. Tawhedi, who arrived in the United States in 2021, had taken steps in recent weeks to advance his attack plans, including by ordering AK-47 rifles, liquidating his family's assets and buying one-way tickets for his wife and child to travel home to Afghanistan. On June 13, 2025, Nasir pleaded guilty on two terrorism-related offenses.	Oklahoma City, Oklahoma	Nasir Ahmad Tawhedi	FMC Fort Worth
November 8, 2024	Houston, Texas apartment, military recruitment facilities, and local synagogues	A 28-year-old local man was arrested for attempting to provide material support to ISIS and planning "a 9/11-style" attack in his own far west Houston apartment, alongside researching military recruitment facilities and local area synagogues in the area.	Houston, Texas	Anas Said	
November 20, 2024	New York Stock Exchange	A 30-year-old man from Coral Springs, Florida was arrested in an alleged plot to bomb the New York Stock Exchange. The FBI investigated that he was storing bomb-making schematics in an unlocked storage unit in Coral Springs.	Coral Springs, Florida	Harun Abdul-Malik	
December 20, 2024	Israeli consulates in New York City	An 18-year-old Egyptian national and former George Mason University student from Falls Church, Virginia was arrested for planning a mass casualty attack on Israeli consulates in New York City. Local officials said that he ran several social media accounts that supported ISIS, al-Qaeda and Hamas, and advocated for violence against Jews.	Falls Church, Virginia	Abdullah Ezzeldin Taha Mohamed Hassan	
December 28, 2024	A pro-Israel organization in Plantation, Florida	A 26-year old man from Gainesville, Florida was arrested by the FBI on federal stalking charges for allegedly plotting an attack on a major pro-Israel organization located nearly five hours away in Plantation, Florida. According to court documents, he visited the pro-Israel organization's office on both December 22 and 23 to "scout" the location, intending to confirm access and return with concealed firearms. FBI agents later confirmed that they disrupted a possible plot to threaten or kill employees of the organization before the first night of Hanukkah.	Tallahassee, Florida	Forrest Kendall Pemberton	
January 23, 2025	Unnamed music venue	An 18-year-old Round Rock, Texas man was arrested by the FBI after allegedly making terroristic threats on controversial gaming platform Roblox to attack a Christian music festival. According to the report, Burger's Roblox user "Crazz3pain" (who joined the platform on December 29, 2022) stated that they were willing to "kill Shia Muslims at their mosque". On February 28, 2025, Burger was booked by Cedar Park police, and was released to federal custody on May 19, 2025. Burger's Roblox account was immediately terminated in connection of his terrorism plots.	Cedar Park, Texas	James Wesley Burger	
February 7, 2025	Greater Boston shopping malls and elementary schools, and both law enforcement and children in Miami, Florida	A 36-year-old man from Wilbraham, Massachusetts was taken into custody in Florida for allegedly making numerous violent threats on social media targeting certain officials and their families, law enforcement officers, private individuals, children, and sensitive locations such as shopping malls and an elementary school across both Massachusetts and Florida. Charging documents reported that his threats often invoked both ISIS and Al Qaeda, and involves explicit and repeated threats to bomb, shoot, or otherwise kill his targets. He was then transferred back to Massachusetts where he'll make his federal court appearance in Springfield.	Miami, Florida	Funwayo Mbilini Nyawo	
February 14, 2025	Jews and synagogues in New York City	A 23-year-old man from West Valley City, Utah was taken into custody after allegedly threatening on social media to kill Jewish people. He drove through Kansas City (alongside a traffic stop there) and Philadelphia into as far as the New Jersey side of the Lincoln Tunnel, where he was stopped by Port Authority Police around 5:30 p.m. that evening. He did not have any weapons when he was stopped by the NYPD and Port Authority Police.	Lincoln Tunnel, Weehawken, New Jersey	Luis Ramirez	
February 24, 2025	White Corpus Christi, Texas area police officers	A 21-year-old black man from Corpus Christi, Texas was taken into custody after planning a mass casualty attack towards white law enforcement officers in his local area similar to the 2016 Dallas shooting when a Mississippi man opened fire on police officers in Dallas, Texas. According to an affidavit, he bragged about being friendly with officers, saying that he wanted to trick them while stalking their movements. The FBI investigated through his text messages shortly before his arrest saying that he had been planning on a similar Dallas attack for years.	Corpus Christi, Texas	Seth "Andrea" Gregori	
April 4, 2025	Studio 8H, NBC Studios, New York City, and a Connecticut college	A 48-year-old man from the Island Creek area of Pikeville, Kentucky was arrested after allegedly threatening to bomb Studio 8H, the studio where Saturday Night Live was, and messaging a threat to a Connecticut college. The NYPD replied that the threat was not deemed credible. The man's name matches that of a person whom actor Scarlett Johansson has previously accused of stalking in an application for a restraining order, according to court documents filed in California.	New York City	Michael Joseph Branham	
April 12, 2025	Coachella	A 40-year-old Santa Monica, California man was arrested after threatening to bomb the Coachella Music & Arts Festival. Police were notified of a suspicious man at the Agua Caliente Casino Resort Spa after security guards were approached by a man traveling in a Tesla who said he'd "be responsible for a bombing" at the festival, according to police. Police arrested the man in nearby Palm Springs.	Palm Springs, California	Davis Darvish	
May 13, 2025	United States Army Tank-Automotive & Armaments Command base in Warren, Michigan	A 19-year-old former member of the Michigan Army National Guard from Melvindale, Michigan was arrested and charged in a criminal complaint with attempting to provide material support to a foreign terrorist organization and distributing information related to a destructive device after attempting to carry out a plan to conduct an ISIS-related mass shooting at a U.S. military base in Warren, with usage of Molotov cocktails and assault-style weapons.	Melvindale, Michigan	Ammar Abdulmajid-Mohamed Said	
August 25, 2025	United States Immigration and Customs Enforcement agents and officers in Dallas, Texas	A 36-year-old Dallas, Texas man was arrested after making terroristic threats against United States Immigration and Customs Enforcement agents at the ICE facility in Love Field, Dallas. Shortly after 6:30 p.m. CT that evening, the man allegedly approached security officers and showed them what he claimed to be a "detonator" on his wrist prompting a shelter-in-place for ICE's Dallas Field Office, according to a senior DHS official. The man allegedly approached the entrance of the facility and claimed he had a bomb in his backpack. A Federal Protective Service officer who was stationed outside the field office called 911, according to a senior DHS official. The Dallas Police Department dispatched a bomb squad to the scene, later arresting the man on charges of allegedly making terroristic threats. According to law enforcement officials, the man was transferred to the Dallas County Jail. Police issued an all-clear at 7:19 p.m. CT, less than an hour after the incident began. One month later on September 24, 2025, a 29-year-old man from Durant, Oklahoma opened fire with a sniper at detainees at the same facility, killing two men and wounding another man before killing himself afterward.	Dallas, Texas	Bratton Dean Wilkinson	
September 3, 2025	Local businesses across Madison County, Illinois	Throughout much of July and August 2025, a 25-year-old man from East Alton, Illinois made multiple terroristic threats towards various local and national businesses across Madison County, Illinois, including his hometown of East Alton. On July 28, the man made four separate calls to the Taco Bell, McDonald's, and Sonic Drive-In in East Alton, and Casey's in Wood River. On July 29, August 10, and August 21, the man made threatening calls to Domino's Pizza in East Alton. On July 30, the man made a similar threatening call towards the same Sonic Drive-In in East Alton. On July 31, the man made a similar threatening call to the same McDonald's, and on August 18 and August 27, the man made similar threatening calls to Runway Lounge in Bethalto. In all cases, the man allegedly threatened a "mass-spree" shooting in all the locations listed, similar to the 2023 Lewiston shootings, according to court documents. According to a petition to deny pre-trial release filed by the Madison County State's Attorney's Office, police identified the man based on his IP address, and was the one admitting making the calls. He was quickly arrested and immediately taken into custody afterward. Later on the same day, another 25-year-old man, from Detroit, Michigan was arrested for making bomb and active shooter threats towards the same businesses in East Alton.	East Alton, Illinois	Austin H. Blair and Jarrett Maki	
September 18, 2025	Zohran Mamdani, his family, and other Muslims	A 44-year-old man from Plano, Texas was arrested and charged with making terroristic threats after allegedly posted four threatening voicemail messages towards New York State Assembly member Zohran Mamdani between June 11 and July 23, 2025. According to a court member, the man told the victim on a voicemail call to "go back to Uganda before somebody shoots him in the head, to keep an eye on his house and family, and to watch his back every second until he leaves America". Some other voicemails contain explicit wordings from the suspect, including "Mamdani was not welcome in New York", "You deserved to be six feet under the ground", and "I'd love to see an IDF bullet go through your skull". The man also made several death threats between both Mamdani and his family alongside other Muslims. He was released on bail and was scheduled to return to court in November 2025.	Plano, Texas	Jeremy Fistel	
September 22, 2025	Wisconsin State Capitol	A 33-year-old man from Madison, Wisconsin was arrested and charged with terroristic threats after allegedly made threats to blow up the Wisconsin State Capitol during a 911 call.	Madison, Wisconsin	Andrei James Anderson	
September 22, 2025	Dearborn, Michigan mosque and black people	A 32-year-old man from Lynchburg, Virginia was arrested by Virginia State Police and charged with committing or aiding in the act of terror, soliciting or recruiting for an act of terrorism, threat to a civilian population and threatening an illegal/immoral act over telephone, after accusing of making references to Dylann Roof, posting comments on "alluding to murdering Black citizens and people who practice Islam", and threatening to target a Michigan church in the Detroit suburb of Dearborn. Shortly after his arrest, an investigation revealed that the man started posting comments in February 2025, as well as YouTube videos three months later. Shortly after his arrest, police replied that the man said he planned on committing the attack if he "had better eyesight", according to the complaint.	Lynchburg, Virginia	Macin Horstemeyer	
October 3, 2025	30 Hudson Yards in New York City	A 35-year-old man from Sugar Land, Texas was arrested and charged with making a terrorist threat after allegedly threatened to kill the top executive at Kohlberg Kravis Roberts & Co. and causing a false bomb threat at the 34th Street–Hudson Yards station nearby, which ended up with a massive evacuation. Prosecutors revealed at an arraignment three days afterward that an obviously distraught individual had showed up at the offices of the private equity giant and asked to see "the CEO of KKR." They also subsequently learned the defendant had driven his car from his home in Sugar Land to New York City that day and parked in the vicinity of Hudson Yards.	New York City	Alexander Le	
October 17, 2025	Protestors in the October 2025 No Kings protests in San Antonio, Texas and an unidentified Texas Democrat	A 66-year-old man from San Antonio, Texas posted multiple comments on his Threads account about the "No Kings" protestors and commented that he was "going to kill protestors" as well as a "random Texas democrat". According to the arrest affidavit, investigators were able to obtain information from Meta Platforms which helped identify the man as the person posting the threats, as well as his address. Police arrested the man but he was released on bond afterward.	San Antonio, Texas	Robert Flores	
October 20, 2025	Hartsfield–Jackson Atlanta International Airport	A family of a 49-year-old man from Cartersville, Georgia with mental health issues and an extensive criminal history told the Cartersville Police Department that he was heading to the airport and had threatened to shoot. His family also told police that he had been livestreaming on social media before arriving that morning at the South Terminal with his Chevrolet Silverado Flatbed. After the man parked at the curbside and walked straight into the airport without carrying anything, officers spotted the Silverado and recovered an AR-15 semi-automatic rifle with 27 rounds of ammunition inside. The man replied after his arrest that he was about to head back to his truck and was "likely to use that weapon in the crowded terminal he had just seen." Atlanta's Police Chief replied in a statement that the man was inside the airport "initially to scope it out". He was immediately charged with terroristic threats, criminal attempt to commit aggravated assault, possession of a firearm during the commission of a felony, and possession of a firearm by a felon. Police reported that Cagle had ties to the city of Panama City, Florida when he was charged with carrying a concealed weapon in 1997 (but never formally convicted), and previously spent three months at the Georgia prison for possession marijuana in Cartersville in May 2000.	Hartsfield–Jackson Atlanta International Airport	Billy Joe Cagle	
October 31, 2025	LGBTQ+ bars in Ferndale, Michigan and Cedar Point	During the morning hours on Halloween 2025, FBI announced several arrests connected with what it called an FBI-inspired terror plot in the Michigan cities of Dearborn and Inkster. The FBI later confirmed the arrests of two 20-year-old men from Dearborn, and a 72-page criminal complaint confirms that both men were inspired by ISIS. Authorities later confirmed that both men previously scouted on targeting LGBTQ+ bars in nearby Ferndale as their attack plan prior to their arrests. A third Dearborn man and two 19-year-old men from Montclair, New Jersey were later arrested a few days later after new images were released. According to authorities, the two New Jersey men are arrested in two separate areas, one at his family's home in Montclair and the other at Newark Liberty International Airport. Police replied that one of the five men was responsible for buying firearms and later conducted surveillance at Cedar Point in Sandusky, Ohio for a possible Halloween attack according to authorities.	Dearborn, Michigan, Inkster, Michigan, Montclair, New Jersey, and Newark Liberty International Airport	Mohmed Ali, Majed Mahmoud, Ayob Asmail Nasser, Tomas Kaan Guzel, and Milo Sedarat	
December 15, 2025	Property owned by two unnamed U.S. companies	Four individuals associated with a radical faction of the little-known, far-left Turtle Island Liberation Front (TILF) were arrested for allegedly planning a series of backpack bombings in southern California. The plot targeted property owned by two "Amazon-type" U.S. companies, though was intended to avoid any casualties. It was planned for New Year's Eve, with bombs simultaneously exploding at midnight. A fifth individual associated with TILF was arrested in New Orleans, but was unrelated to the California plot.	San Bernardino County, California	Audrey Carroll, Zachary Page, Dante Gaffield and Tina Lai	
December 31, 2025	Local businesses in Mint Hill, North Carolina	Federal agencies arrested an 18-year-old local man with a history of violence for plotting a New Year's Eve terroristic attack at a grocery store and a fast-food restaurant in his home in Mint Hill. Authorities confirmed that Sturdivant had contacted with ISIS members in TikTok chatrooms and "had pledged allegiance to ISIS" while planning the attack. An FBI agent told authorities that Sturdivant wrote a manifesto and stole two hammers out of the storage shed before hiding them in his house.	Mint Hill, North Carolina	Christian Sturdivant	
August 20, 2026	New York State Capitol, Times Square, and White House	FBI agents arrested 35-year-old woman Jessica Bowie for plotting violence against the New York State Capitol. She was radicalized by ISIS and planned the attack to celebrate the 9/11 attacks. FBI discovered bomb-making materials and also founded her purchasing bomb making materials on camera. She told informants that if she was successful. She would plan more targets and attacks on US soil “New Year’s Eve in Times Square". She also boasted to informants that she also wanted to bomb the White House “with the President".	Albany, New York	Jessica Bowie	

== See also ==
- Terrorism
- Terrorism in the United States
- List of unsuccessful attacks related to schools
