= Jubair Ahmad =

Pakistani terrorist

Jubair Ahmad is a Pakistani American from Woodbridge, Virginia who pleaded guilty on December 2, 2011 to supporting designated foreign terrorist organization Lashkar-e-Taiba (LeT), by producing a propaganda video for the group. He was sentenced to 12 years in prison in 2012.

== Early life ==
Ahmad was born in Sialkot, Pakistan. According to an affidavit submitted to the court by FBI, Ahmad stated that while in Pakistan he attended a training camp run by LeT. A Permanent resident of U.S. he arrived in the U.S. In 2007. According to the FBI in September 2010 Ahmad directly communicated with Talha Saeed who is the son of LeT chief Hafiz Muhammad Saeed, made a video glorifying jihad at his request and uploaded it on YouTube Ahmad is the second LeT operative after David Headley to plead guilty in a U.S. court.

== Arrest and guilty plea ==
Ahmad was arrested in September 2011 by FBI. On December 2, 2011 Ahmad acknowledged in the court that he made a propaganda video for LeT which he later uploaded to YouTube. Prosecuting attorney Neil MacBride pointed out during the hearing that Lashkar-e-Taiba was a violent Islamist group which is widely believed to be responsible for 2008 Mumbai attacks in which six Americans died. Ahmads lawyer declined comment but stated that his clients case raised some unique legal issues in light of ruling by Supreme Court of the United States in Holder v. Humanitarian Law Project case which he intends to discuss during sentencing phase. He was sentenced to 12 years in prison on April 13, 2012.

== See also ==
- Faisal Shahzad - a Pakistani criminal convicted of the 2010 Times Square car bombing
- Farooque Ahmed - a Pakistani-American convicted of planning subway bombs in Washington, D.C., United States
