= 2010 Portland car bomb plot =

Failed bombing plot

Mohamed Osman Mohamud
- Born: 1991 (age 34–35); Somalia
- Citizenship: American
- Known for: Arrested as prime suspect in 2010 Portland car bomb plot
- Criminal charge: Attempted use of a weapon of mass destruction
- Criminal penalty: 30 years federal imprisonment and lifetime supervision
- Criminal status: Incarcerated

The 2010 Portland car bomb plot involved an incident in which Mohamed Osman Mohamud (born 1991), a Somali-American student, was arrested in an FBI sting operation on November 26, 2010, after attempting to set off what he thought was a car bomb at a Christmas tree lighting in Portland, Oregon. He was charged with attempting to use a weapon of mass destruction. An attorney for Mohamud argued that his client was entrapped. On January 31, 2013, a jury found Mohamud guilty of the single charge against him. He was scheduled to be sentenced on December 18, 2013, however the sentencing was cancelled in anticipation of the filing of new motions by the defense. In September 2014, Mohamud was sentenced to 30 years in federal prison with credit for time served, as well as lifetime supervision upon release in 2040.

== Background and incident ==
Mohamud was born in Somalia, came to America as a refugee, and grew up in Beaverton, Oregon, a suburb of the Portland metropolitan area. He is a naturalized U.S. citizen. Mohamud graduated from Westview High School in Beaverton. He attended Oregon State University, but dropped out on October 6, 2010, without having declared a major. At the time of the incident, he was a resident of Corvallis, Oregon.

Under the pen name Ibnul Mubarak, Mohamud had written articles on physical fitness for the English-language publication Jihad Recollections as part of his earlier attempts to be associated with violent jihad ideology. He maintained contact with a former American student living in Pakistan.

Mohamud had been monitored by the FBI for months. He reportedly attracted the interest of the FBI after agents intercepted e-mails he was exchanging with a man who had returned to the Middle East, and whom law enforcement officials described as a “recruiter for terrorism.” The man had previously lived in Oregon, where Mohamud reportedly met him, before moving first to Yemen and then to Pakistan.

A year prior to his arrest, he was accused but not charged with date raping an intoxicated woman on the Oregon State University campus.

Prior to Mohamud's arrest, an undercover FBI agent, posing as a terrorist, had been in contact with him since June 2010. The FBI put him on a no-fly list, preventing him from traveling to Kodiak, Alaska from Portland International Airport on June 10, 2010. Prosecutors said he was instead interviewed by the FBI, whom he told he wanted to earn money fishing and then travel to join "the brothers," and that he had earlier hoped to travel to Yemen but had not obtained a ticket or visa.

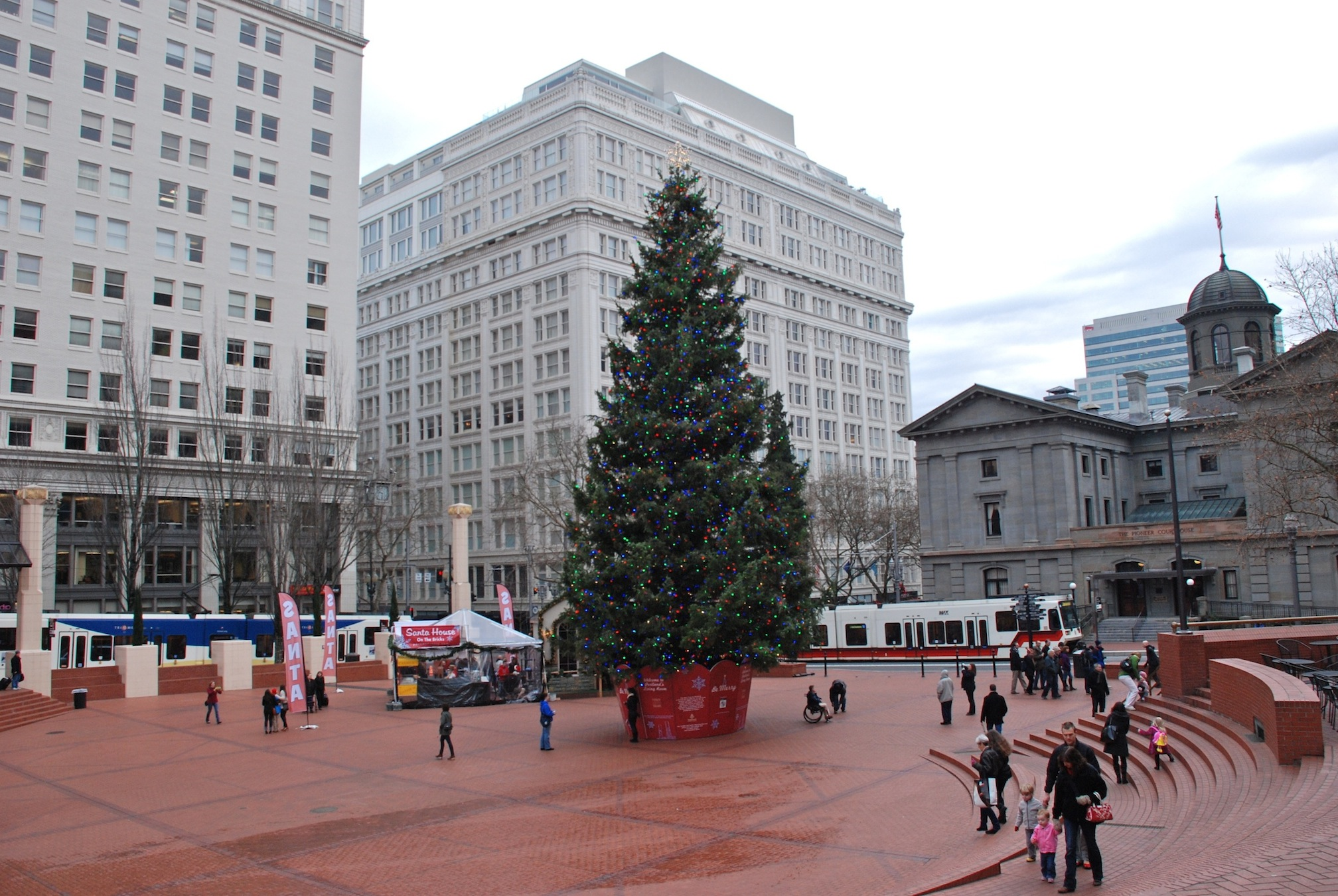
Pioneer Courthouse Square, the site of the attempted bombing, with Christmas tree in 2011

In preparation for the planned bombing of a public gathering, Mohamud and undercover FBI operatives drove to a remote area of Lincoln County, Oregon, where they conducted a test run on November 4 by detonating a real bomb Mohamud believed to have been hidden inside a backpack.

The attempted main bombing took place at Portland's Pioneer Courthouse Square at the corner of Southwest Yamhill Street and Sixth Avenue, as tens of thousands of people gathered for the city's annual Christmas tree lighting. The fake bomb was in a white van that carried six 55-gallon drums with what appeared to be real detonation cords and plastic caps. Mohamud tried to detonate the bomb by dialing a cell phone that was attached to it. When the device failed to explode, the undercover agent suggested he get out of the car to obtain better reception. When he did so he was arrested. Because the FBI ensured that the device had no explosive components—even the detonating caps were inert—the public was never in any danger. According to an affidavit, Mohamud told the agents, "I want whoever is attending that event to leave, to leave either dead or injured."

== Analysis ==
Early analysis questioned whether entrapment by FBI operatives was involved, an Oregonian columnist asking "how far would Mohamud have traveled down that road without the help of those very operatives?" Noting "astonishing similarities" to a simultaneous case near Baltimore, Maryland, The Oregonian quoted a New York University expert that such cases were "a strategy the FBI set upon years ago." Presumably aware of legal defenses based on issues of entrapment, FBI agents reportedly offered Mohamud multiple alternatives to a bombing with mass casualties, including prayer. Mohamud reportedly insisted he wanted to play an "operational" role, and even wanted to pick the target for the bombing. He had also been told several times that his planned bomb could kill women and children, and was given multiple opportunities to back out, but he told agents: "Since I was 15 I thought about all this... It's gonna be a fireworks show... a spectacular show." Christopher Dickey of Newsweek said the FBI "took no chances with the court of public opinion" to make sure that Mohamud did not appear to be a victim of entrapment. Noting that key evidence from an alleged July 30 meeting may already be missing, a court ordered the FBI to preserve remaining media and recording equipment. Noting past behavior by the FBI in similar cases, New York lawyer Martin Stolar asserted the absence of such recordings was intentional. "Once somebody's been induced, and they agree to do the crime, that's when the recording starts.... He's already been induced to commit the crime, so everything on the tape is shit."

A The Washington Post feature traced the radical roots of the ideology held by young Somalis such as Mohamud to the Islamicization of Somalia following the collapse of the socialist government of Mohamed Siad Barre.

Somali Foreign Minister Mohamed Abdullahi Omar said "Mohamud's attempt is neither representative nor an example of Somalis. Somalis are peace-loving people," adding that the Somali government was "ready and willing" to assist in preventing future attempts.

== Trial ==
Mohamud was charged with a single count of attempting to use a weapon of mass destruction. His trial began on January 10, 2013 and concluded on January 31 with the jury finding him guilty. He faced up to life in prison and was initially scheduled to be sentenced on June 27, 2013. However, in a motion filed on June 17, federal prosecutors requested that sentencing be delayed two to three months because the government needs more time to prepare its sentencing recommendations. Mohamud's sentencing was subsequently rescheduled for December 18, 2013, then cancelled in anticipation of defense motions. In October 2014, Mohamud was sentenced to 30 years in federal prison along with credit for time served since his arrest, as well as lifetime supervision upon his scheduled release in 2036. He is being held at the Federal Correctional Institution, Sandstone, a low-security federal prison in Minnesota.

== Mosque arson ==
The Salman Al-Farisi Islamic Center in Corvallis, Oregon, where Mohamud occasionally attended services, was set on fire on November 28, 2010. Police determined that arson was the cause and investigated it as a possible hate crime. In response, the Council on American-Islamic Relations called on authorities to increase their presence in Muslim communities in Oregon.

On August 24, 2011, federal agents arrested Cody Seth Crawford, 24, on a federal hate crimes indictment in what they stated was a racially motivated arson at the mosque. A federal judge ordered that Crawford be detained as a danger to the community due to his prior arrest history. Crawford's court-appointed attorneys stated that he suffers from alcohol and mental illness issues. Crawford was convicted of a federal charge of damaging religious property and sentenced to 5 years probation.

== See also ==
- Amine El Khalifi
- Faisal Shahzad
- Farooque Ahmed
- Hemant Lakhani
- Hosam Maher Husein Smadi
- Liberty City Seven
