= Rezwan Ferdaus =

American physicist

- Born: 1985 (age 40–41); Massachusetts, United States
- Arrested: September 28, 2011
- Citizenship: United States
- Status: Incarcerated at Federal Correctional Institution, Ray Brook

Rezwan Ferdaus (born 1985) is a United States citizen who is serving a federal prison sentence after pleading guilty to terrorism charges in 2012.

== Biography ==
Ferdaus was born and raised in Ashland, Massachusetts. He is of Bangladeshi descent. Ferdaus had two previous arrests, one for a high school prank during which he and other students poured cement on in front of the school doors, and the other for marijuana possession. Ferdaus studied physics at Northeastern University in Boston.

== Arrest ==
An undercover FBI agent infiltrated Ferdaus' local mosque, and coaxed him into agreeing to participate in a terror attack, despite being aware he had a mental disability.

Ferdaus was arrested by the Federal Bureau of Investigation on September 28, 2011, for plotting to attack The Pentagon and the United States Capitol Building with remote-controlled model aircraft packed with C-4 explosives. He was also charged with supporting Al-Qaeda by plotting attacks on American soldiers abroad and making detonators for improvised explosive devices.

== Guilty plea and sentencing ==
On July 20, 2012, Ferdaus pleaded guilty to the following charges in Federal District Court in Boston, Massachusetts:

- Conspiracy to destroy national defense premises
- Conspiracy to damage and destroy buildings owned by the U.S. government
- Conspiracy to provide material support and resources to Al-Qaeda.

Prosecutors and Ferdaus's defense attorneys agreed to recommend a 17-year sentence. On November 1, 2012, Judge Richard Stearns sentenced Ferdaus to 17 years in federal prison.

Ferdaus was then booked in the incarcerated at the United States Penitentiary, Victorville, a high-security facility in California. He was later booked in New York at the Federal Correctional Institution, Ray Brook, and is scheduled for release in 2026.

== Human Rights Watch ==
Ferdaus's arrest and prosecution has been criticized by Human Rights Watch, who state that he was incapable of carrying out the plans which were alleged. Ferdaus experienced severe physical and mental health issues leading up to his arrest, at one point requiring his father to quit his job to take care of him. The FBI knew about his mental health issues, but continued the operation.

== See also ==
- Farooque Ahmed
- Amine El Khalifi
- David Headley
- Sami Osmakac
- Faisal Shahzad
