= Amine El Khalifi =

Moroccan man (born 1983)

Amine El Khalifi أمين محمد الخليفي
- Born: c. 1983 (age 42–43); Morocco
- Status: Incarcerated at FCI Memphis
- Conviction: Attempted use of a weapon of mass destruction (18 U.S.C. § 2332a)
- Penalty: 30 years imprisonment

Amine El Khalifi (Arabic: أمين محمد الخليفي; born c. 1983) is a Moroccan man who was arrested by the Federal Bureau of Investigation (FBI) for plotting to carry out a suicide bombing on the United States Capitol as part of what he intended to be a terrorist operation. He was charged with "attempting to use a weapon of mass destruction against federal property."

El Khalifi thought he was working with al-Qaeda operatives, but was actually in contact with undercover FBI agents. He is believed to have no actual ties to al-Qaeda. All arms and support were provided by the FBI, and authorities say the operation never placed the public in danger.

On June 22, 2012, El Khalifi pleaded guilty in federal court in the Eastern District of Virginia and was sentenced to 30 years in prison the following September.

== Early life ==
El Khalifi came to the United States on a visitor's visa at the age of 16. He settled in Arlington County, Virginia, as an illegal immigrant when his visa expired in 1999.

He worked at odd jobs and had occasional minor brushes with the law, including a marijuana charge and traffic violations. According to an acquaintance, El Khalifi regularly attended a mosque in Falls Church.

El Khalifi attracted attention in 2010, when his suburban Virginia landlord called police after the man allegedly threatened to beat him up. At the time, El Khalifi was being evicted from his apartment for failure to pay rent. The landlord was suspicious of packages El Khalifi had been receiving, and told police he thought El Khalifi was making bombs, but police told him to leave the man alone. At least one other man was living with El Khalifi at the time, and he claimed to be running a luggage business.

== Bombing plot ==
By January 2011, El Khalifi was under federal surveillance. At a meeting in an Arlington residence he agreed when someone stated that the "war on terrorism" was a "war on Muslims," according to an informant. El Khalifi watched as the man produced an AK-47 rifle, two revolvers and ammunition, and discussed being ready to "fight back".

El Khalifi allegedly expressed a desire to be "associated with an armed extremist group." In December 2011, he was introduced to "Yusaf", an undercover officer. El Khalifi allegedly told Yusaf that he wanted to carry out a mass shooting at a Washington, D.C. restaurant frequented by U.S. military officers. He allegedly wanted to kill at least 30 people and was also considering targeting an office building in Alexandria, a restaurant, or a synagogue. He is said to have expressed interest in gunning people down "face-to-face."

On January 7, 2012, El Khalifi discussed a larger attack on a military facility. On January 15, El Khalifi changed his plan, allegedly telling under cover officers that he now wanted to carry out a suicide bombing. That same day he is said to have carried out a test with a cellphone detonation device. When the test was successful, he expressed a desire for larger explosives, enough to blow up a building. He selected February 17 as the day for his attack. He visited Washington, D.C. several times over the following weeks to plan his attack and purchased supplies for his operation including nails. He asked for a gun to shoot anyone who tried to interfere with his "martyrdom operation" and request remote detonation of the bomb in the event he was captured.

On February 17, El Khalifi went to the Dar Al-Hijrah Islamic Center to pray before embarking on a suicide mission. Authorities say he was "not a regular" at that mosque or any other in the area. The mosque's imam offered to provide authorities with surveillance footage, but was told it was not necessary. Later that day, El Khalifi was provided a disarmed suicide vest and MAC-10 by Yusaf and transported to downtown Washington. He was arrested before he exited the parking building he had been dropped off in, as he walked alone toward the Capitol building. After the arrest, authorities raided his west Alexandria residence and searched his property. "There is no doubt that this guy was committed," commented a law enforcement officer.

El Khalifi was unemployed at the time of arrest and is not believed to have a genuine association with al-Qaeda. Authorities say they are close to arresting an associate of his on unrelated charges. "Today's case underscores the continuing threat we face from homegrown violent extremists," remarked Assistant Attorney General Lisa Monaco. "Thanks to a coordinated law enforcement effort, El Khalifi's plot was thwarted before anyone was harmed." Some commentators were critical of the arrest, saying the sting operation was a form of entrapment.

=== Court case ===
El Khalifi appeared in court the afternoon of his arrest and was charged with attempting to use a weapon of mass destruction against U.S. property. An attorney for the government stated "El Khalifi ... devised the plot, the targets and the methods on his own." On February 22, El Khalifi appeared in court before Judge John Anderson and waived his rights to preliminary and detention hearings. He was represented by a federal public defender during the hearing. Judge Anderson ordered El Khalifi held pending indictment due to the serious nature of the charges.

At a hearing on June 22, 2012, before U.S. District Court Judge James C. Cacheris, El Khalifi pleaded guilty to one count of attempted use of a weapon of mass destruction (specifically, a destructive device consisting of an improvised explosive device) against U.S. property, namely, the U.S. Capitol Building in Washington, D.C. As part of the plea agreement, the United States and El Khalifi agree that a sentence within a range of 25 years to 30 years' incarceration is the appropriate disposition of this case. El Khalifi was sentenced to 30 years in prison on September 14, 2012. He is currently at FMC Butner with BOP #79748-083.

== See also ==
- 2010 Portland car bomb plot
- Islamic extremism in the United States
- Farooque Ahmed
- Rezwan Ferdaus
- David Headley
- Sami Osmakac
- Faisal Shahzad
