= Sathajhan Sarachandran =

Canadian criminal

Sarhajhan Sarachandran is a Canadian former member of the Tamil Tigers who pleaded guilty to trying to purchase anti-aircraft missiles for the militant group. He was convicted of supporting terrorism.

American Nadarasa Yogarasa was alleged to have helped Sarachandran concoct the plan, after Sarachandran contacted an FBI informant in Brooklyn, New York, about purchasing weapons for the Tigers. He had arranged to purchase 10 Russian SA18 missiles and 500 AK-47 assault rifles for US$900,000. Sarachandran was a student at the University of Toronto. On January 26, 2009, he pleaded guilty, and two days later his co-defendants Sahilal Sabaratnam and Thiruthanikan Thanigasalam also pleaded guilty. He was imprisoned at Federal Correctional Institution, Ray Brook. In 2019, he was released from custody and deported back to Canada.
