= 2007 John F. Kennedy International Airport attack plot =

Foiled terrorist plot

- Location: New York City, New York, United States
- Date: Planned, never executed
- Target: John F. Kennedy International Airport
- Attack type: Islamic terrorist plot
- Deaths: 0
- Injuries: 0

The 2007 John F. Kennedy International Airport attack plot was an alleged Islamist terrorist plot to blow up a system of jet fuel supply tanks and pipelines that feed fuel to John F. Kennedy International Airport (JFK) in Queens, New York. These pipelines travel throughout the undergrounds of New York City in densely populated areas. The alleged plot was foiled when an undercover law enforcement official was recruited to the homegrown terrorist cell.

== Plot ==
The suspects were Russell Defreitas, a United States citizen and native of Guyana who was the alleged ringleader and worked for a time at the airport; Abdul Kadir, a citizen of Guyana and former member of the Guyanese National Assembly; Kareem Ibrahim, a citizen of Trinidad and Tobago; and Abdel Nur, a citizen of Guyana and uncle of former world welterweight boxing champion Andrew "Six Heads" Lewis.

In a recorded conversation, Russell Defreitas allegedly told an informant that "Anytime you hit Kennedy, it is the most hurtful thing to the United States. To hit John F. Kennedy, wow.... They love JFK – he's like the man. If you hit that, the whole country will be in mourning. It's like you can kill the man twice." Defreitas had allegedly seen arms and missiles being shipped to Israel which he felt would be used to harm Muslims.

The men are alleged to have named the plot "Chicken Farm". Extensive surveillance of the targets including the use of satellite photographs had been done and attempts had been made to reach out to another Islamist terrorist group. No explosives had been bought.

A New York City police source told Newsday that investigators were probing a possible Iran connection to the plot because Abdul Kadir planned to visit that country. In Trinidad, police reportedly investigated whether Kareem Ibrahim had ties to Iraq and Iran. On August 6 it emerged that U.S. authorities would allege the plotters planned to seek help from Iran. According to US court documents, Kadir was the disciple of Mohsen Rabbani, an Iranian diplomat accused of being one of the masterminds behind the 1994 AMIA bombing in Buenos Aires.

== Arrests and trial ==
Defreitas was arrested in Brooklyn, New York. Kadir and Ibrahim were arrested in Trinidad on June 3, 2007. Nur surrendered to police two days later in Trinidad.

On June 25, 2008 Kareem Ibrahim, Abdel Nur and Abdul Kadir were extradited to the United States. They pleaded not guilty to charges of trying to "cause greater destruction than in the Sept. 11 attacks". The men were ordered held without bail pending a hearing scheduled for August 7. Russell Defreitas was held in jail after an earlier not guilty plea. On June 29 the four men were indicted on charges with conspiring to "cause death, serious bodily injury and extensive destruction" at the airport. On August 6, a judge ordered three of the alleged plotters extradited to the United States. On August 2, 2010, Kadir and Defreitas were convicted in the JFK airport bomb plot. In 2011, Ibrahim was found guilty of the JFK Airport bomb plot, and in February 2012, Ibrahim was sentenced to life to prison.

The informant in the case was a longtime cocaine dealer who cooperated with investigators after being convicted of possession of about $2 million worth of cocaine in 2003, according to court documents posted on thesmokinggun.com. The 36-year-old man is described in the documents as a onetime member of a violent drug gang first convicted in 1996 of selling cocaine and crack and being part of a conspiracy to murder a rival drug kingpin. The rival survived the attempted hit, according to the federal complaint in the drug trafficking and racketeering case. After the web posting according to FBI spokesman James Margolin. "We're concerned about the safety of the Source and are taking measures to safeguard him."

On January 19, 2016 Ibrahim died in custody at the age of 70 at the U.S. Medical Center for Federal Prisoners in Springfield, Missouri. Before his death he was BOP#64657-053. His cause of death was revealed as heart failure. Defreitas is serving his life sentence at USP McCreary with BOP#64347-053. Abdel Nur was sentenced to 15 years and was assigned BOP# 64655-053 and served his sentence at USP Lewisburg. In 2020 he was deported to Guyana.

== Controversy over the seriousness of the plot ==
A debate has emerged in the wake of plot about the seriousness of a threat this plot posed and how seriously foiled plots should be taken in general. Criticism has emerged to the statement by U.S. Attorney Roslynn Mauskopf that the plot could have been "one of the most chilling plots imaginable," which might have caused "unthinkable" devastation. According to critics such as Bruce Schneier the plot was never operational and the public had never been at risk. And the notion of blowing up the airport, let alone the borough of Queens, by exploding a fuel tank was in all likelihood a technical impossibility. Also cited are a portrait emerging of alleged mastermind Russell Defreitas as hapless and episodically homeless, and of co-conspirator Abdel Nur as a drug addict.

The New York Times put the story of the plot on page 37 the day after the plot was announced. Rich Lowry, editor of the National Review writing in the New York Post, criticized the Times' decision saying "Foiled terror plots often will seem ridiculous and unlikely, especially when they are pre-empted" but should be taken seriously. Rep. Peter King, former chairman and member of the United States House Committee on Homeland Security, dismissed criticism of law enforcement as "the price of success when you haven't been attacked in six years. We've gone from criticizing them for not doing enough immediately after 9/11 to now criticizing them too much."

== See also ==
- List of unsuccessful terrorist plots in the United States post-9/11
