= Hudson River bomb plot =

Failed bomb plot targeting New York City

On July 6, 2006, the New York Daily News released a story claiming the FBI had disrupted a terrorist plot to bomb the tunnels connecting New Jersey with Manhattan and drown the New York Financial District with a torrent of water.

The following day the FBI clarified there had been online messages about the idea, but none of the authors were in the United States or making efforts to enter the United States, and counterterrorism officials cast doubt on the significance of the alleged plot and some authorities questioned the breaking news first reported by James Gordon Meek.

The alleged plot was unfeasible since the tunnel is embedded in bedrock, and the target is above sea level. There was no evidence that the plotters had taken any actions, such as buying explosives or sending money. Two U.S. counterterrorism officials, speaking to the Washington Post, discounted the ability of the conspirators to carry out an attack. The report, however, made international news. The government initially protested about how the story was leaked to the New York Daily News. The Department of Homeland Security assured the public there "was never a concern that (the plot) would actually be executed". Although Meek had specifically said the Holland Tunnel was the target of the plot, authorities disputed this and said there had been "extremely vague" messages sent between online user accounts on a website they were monitoring.

== Assem Hammoud ==
Professor Assem Hammoud was said to be a key figure. He graduated from Concordia University in Montreal, Canada, graduating with a 2002 Bachelor of Commerce degree before returning to Beirut to teach at the Lebanese International University - although his girlfriend and one of his brothers remained in Canada.

As a result of the news of the alleged plot, Hammoud was arrested by Lebanese authorities in the summer of 2006 and was released on bail in June 2008.

The Lebanese Internal Security Forces released a confession from Hammoud, agreeing he made plans hoping to follow in the path of Osama bin Laden.

In 2003, Hammoud had met with a Syrian who took him to Ain al-Hilweh, a Palestinian refugee camp in Lebanon, to practice with weapons. In 2005, Hammoud met with a foreign man who asked Hammoud to provide weapons and shelter to mujahideen.

== See also ==
- List of unsuccessful terrorist plots in the United States post-9/11
