= Yassin M. Aref =

Iraqi Imam

Yassin Aref
- Born: January 7, 1970 (age 56); Kurdistan Region
- Occupation: Author
- Notable work: Son of Mountains, Numerous poetry works (written in Kurdish)

Yassin Aref is poet, writer, and religious scholar of Kurdish background who was the central figure of a controversial sting operation leading to years of incarceration in the Federal Bureau of Prisons. A resident of Albany, New York, Aref was arrested by Federal authorities in August 2004 as part of a sting operation, convicted in October 2006 of conspiracy and money laundering charges and sentenced to 15 years in prison in March 2007. The sting operation revolved around FBI informant Shahed Hussein, who later became notorious for his involvement in other controversial cases of entrapment as well as the Schoarie Limousine crash. In 2023, a federal judge ordered the release of 3 other defendants who were also entrapped in a separate sting by Shahed Hussein, saying that FBI had used a "villain” of an informant, and that "the real lead conspirator was the United States". Aref's case drew criticism from human rights groups such as the ACLU and the NYCLU . In July 2008, an appellate court upheld the convictions, rejecting all of the defense's arguments. The decision caused outrage amongst the local community, as supporters maintained the position that he was being persecuted. Aref completed his 15-year prison sentence in October, 2018 and was deported to Iraqi Kurdistan in June, 2019.

Aref wrote a memoir, Son of Mountains: My Life as a Kurd and a Terror Suspect (2008).

== Background ==
US forces found Aref's name, address, and phone number in a notebook in a bombed-out Iraqi encampment in 2003. The information was classified, and the defense, despite defense counsel having received security clearances, was provided with almost no information about the notebook.

Originally the government claimed that the notebook entry said "commander" next to Aref's name; however, when the judge asked the government to provide the notebook page, the government admitted that there had been a "mistranslation" and the word in question was "kak," which means "brother," not "commander," and is a common Kurdish term of respect. Aref is from (Iraqi Kurdistan), and his grandfather was a famous imam; Aref was already known and respected in the area.

There was no way to know what group was bombed by US forces at the encampment; at times, groups such as the Kurdistan Justice Group, run by Ali Bapir, were bombed by the US, even though they did not oppose US forces.

The Federal Bureau of Investigation (FBI) claimed that Aref is tied to Mullah Krekar, the founder of Ansar al-Islam. When Aref left Iraq as a refugee in 1994, he lived in Syria for 5 years. During that time he was approved by the UN as a refugee to be sent to a third country, which ended up being the US. While in Syria, Aref worked first as a gardener for a rich businessman, and then for the Damascus Office of the IMK (Islamic Movement in Kurdistan), an Islamic Kurdish group which had worked with the US to oppose Saddam Hussein, and which helped Kurdish refugees in Syria. IMK was never claimed to be a terrorist organization. Mullah Krekar was an IMK official who, at the end of 2001, two years after Aref had left Syria and the IMK job, split from IMK to form Ansar al Islam, which is a designated terrorist organization. While Aref had met Krekar briefly a couple of times through his IMK job, he did not really know him, and was opposed to his extremist politics.

Aref came to the US as a United Nations refugee in 1999 with his wife and three young children. He initially found work as a janitor at a local hospital and as an ambulance driver.[3] After a year he was hired as the imam of the Masjid As Salam Mosque.

== Sting operation ==
Based perhaps on the discovery of the notebook in Iraq in 2003, the FBI launched a sting operation targeting Aref. FBI agents convinced a Pakistani informant (who was facing a long prison sentence and deportation for fraud) to approach a friend of Aref's, Mohammed Mosharref Hossain, as a means of getting to Aref.

The FBI plan was that the informant, Shahed Hussein, would offer to loan $50,000 cash to Hossain, and get back $45,000 in checks from Hossain's business (a pizza shop), telling him that the money was made from buying a Chinese surface-to-air missile, which was to be provided to a group called JEM (Jaish-e-Mohammed), which was to use it to attack the Pakistani Ambassador in New York City. However, none of that was true.

Needing a witness to the loan, as is obligatory for Muslims, the men then brought Aref into the arrangement, solely as a witness to the loan transactions. The government eventually arrested both men, claiming that Aref chose to support money laundering by witnessing the loan. The defense argued that Aref, who spoke very poor English at the time, did not understand that this was anything other than a legitimate loan. Defense attorneys claimed that both Aref and Hossain were unfairly convicted–that Hossain was entrapped, and that Aref did not realize any laws were being broken.

Pakistan protested the sting having been based on a fictional plot to assassinate the Pakistani ambassador to the United Nations.

== Shahed Hussein ==
The informant, Shahed Hussein, went on to target people in at least two other cases (and appeared unknowingly in two documentaries), was paid over $100,000 by the FBI, and then started a limousine business which ignored safety regulations and caused an accident which killed 20 people in 2018.

Hussein targeted James Cromitie in the Newburgh 4 sting case, where he promised Cromitie $250,000 when he became uninterested in the plot. The case was the subject of a 2014 HBO documentary called The Newburgh Sting. The prosecution admitted that Hussein lied on the stand during the trial, and the judge later wrote to prosecutors (see page 7 of the link) recommending they investigate, but that never occurred.

In 2012, Hussein was brought in to join an FBI sting operation in Pittsburgh, targeting Khalifah Al-Akili. As documented in the award-winning documentary, (T)error (available on Netflix) Al-Akili realized Hussain was an FBI informant and blew the whistle on the sting. Al-Akili still got an eight-year sentence on an un-related gun charge, and was interviewed by Democracy Now in prison in 2015, before his release in 2018.

In October, 2018, the brakes on one of Hussein's limousines completely failed, killing 20 people in the worst US transportation disaster since 2009. Hussein had left the country shortly before, leaving his son, Nauman, to run it in his absence. As of September, 2019, Nauman Hussein is facing 20 homicide counts while his father, Shahed Hussain, has not returned to the US.

== Trial ==
The trial occurred in September and October 2006. Hossain was convicted of all the counts, and Aref was convicted of 10 of the 30 counts, of conspiring to aid a terrorist group and provide support for a weapon of mass destruction, as well as money-laundering and supporting a foreign terrorist organization, Jaish-e-Mohammed, a group in Pakistan that the informant told the men he supported.

Both men filed appeals. The Aref defense attorneys argued on appeal that there was insufficient evidence, and that this was shown by the fact that Aref was acquitted of all the counts based on the most significant of the recorded conversations with the informant-the two conversations underlying the counts on which he was convicted provided him with no new information.

On March 8, 2007, both Aref and Hossain were sentenced to 15 years in prison–half the sentence called for under the Federal Sentencing Guidelines. Aref's defense counsel filed a lengthy sentencing memorandum which described Aref's background and the support shown for him in the community. Aref professed innocence before his sentencing, and criticized the government's treatment of Muslims. After sentencing, Aref was taken to the Communication Management Unit (CMU) at the federal prison in Terre Haute, Indiana. He was assigned BOP# 12778–052.

The Times Union ( ) and the Daily Gazette (), Albany's two main daily newspapers, both ran editorials at the time of the sentencing asking for extreme leniency, the Times Union on March 8 and 9 and the Gazette on March 9.

In addition, Times Union columnist Fred LeBrun, who had followed the trial closely, wrote, prior to the sentencing,

Someday we'll look back on the present national paranoia over terrorism and the excesses done in its name with the same national embarrassment that Americans feel for Sen. Joe McCarthy's communist witch hunts of the 1950s and our appalling treatment of Japanese-Americans during World War II. Someday. But not anytime soon, and certainly not before Yassin M. Aref, the former imam at an Albany mosque, and Mohammed M. Hossain, a pizza shop owner, are sentenced ... Looking up from a warm seat somewhere, Senator Joe must be viewing all this with a knowing smile.

Carl Strock, the columnist for the Gazette, wrote many columns attacking the process as extremely unfair.

The FBI responded by contacting the editorial boards of the Times Union and the Gazette and running an op-ed piece in the Gazette upholding the sting operation as legitimate.

== Muslim Solidarity Committee ==
After the convictions, the Muslim Solidarity Committee (MSC) was formed to support Aref, Hossain, and their families. It generated over 50 letters, and nearly 1,000 signatures on a petition, to the judge in support of leniency, and raised over $30,000 to support the two families. Its founders won an award from the NYCLU in November 2007.

In 2008, supporters formed another group, Project Salam, which started studying other Muslim “terrorism” convictions, and advocating for others they believed had been treated unfairly. In 2010, Project Salam joined with other groups to form the National Coalition to Protect Civil Freedoms (NCPCF) (later shortened to the Coalition for Civil Freedoms [CCF]) which does essentially the same thing, on a larger scale. In 2018, members of Project Salam recorded a podcast, Terror Talk in which they discussed the Aref/Hossain case and the larger context over several episodes.

== Appeal ==
Aref's appeal, along with that of Hossain, was denied by the Second Circuit Court of Appeals on July 2, 2008. A petition for certiorari to the United States Supreme Court was denied on March 9, 2009.

As reported on the front page of The New York Times on August 26, 2007, the Aref appeal could have been an important test case for the NSA warrantless wiretapping program, as it appeared to be the only criminal case where there was strong evidence that the program was used to target a defendant Both the ACLU and the NYCLU got involved in the case.

However, in its opinion, the Second Circuit held that Aref had no right to know about this because it was classified. In an accompanying summary order, the court also sidestepped the issue by claiming that Aref hadn't shown a “colorable basis” for asserted he had been wiretapped under the NSA program.

In July, 2009, the Inspector General for the Department of Justice published a report saying that DOJ should re-examine criminal cases to see if exculpatory evidence had been unfairly kept from the defense due to the evidence having been classified. Nothing ever came of that.

On April 5, 2010, the Albany, NY Common Council passed a resolution asking DOJ to act on the Inspector General's Report and re-examine the Aref case as well as others. That never occurred.

== Background on the wiretapping issue in the case ==
In December 2005, The New York Times revealed that President Bush had taken the controversial step of secretly authorizing the NSA to expand its surveillance to within the US. A month later another NYT article quoted government officials as saying that the NSA program led them to Aref. On January 20, 2006, Aref's lawyers filed a motion challenging the case against Aref as tainted by the illegality of the NSA program–the motion stated,

The government engaged in illegal electronic surveillance of thousands of US persons, including Yassin Aref, then instigated a sting operation to attempt to entrap Mr. Aref into supporting a non-existent terrorist plot, then dared to claim that the illegal NSA operation was justified because it was the only way to catch Mr. Aref!

On March 10, 2006, the government filed a response to the defense motion which was completely classified, something defense attorneys and the NYLCU said was virtually unheard of and a violation of the 6th Amendment right to confront evidence. Approximately two hours later Judge McAvoy denied the defense motion in a "Classified Order," something even more unheard of.

Then on March 22, 2006, the defense filed a petition for mandamus with the Second Circuit Court of Appeals, challenging Judge McAvoy's decision and arguing that the process had violated Aref's constitutional rights–the NYCLU also filed a brief supporting the right of public access to court decisions. In July 2008, the Second Circuit turned down the petition. The federal appeals court upheld the conviction. "The evidence sufficed for a jury to conclude that Aref [and Hossain] intended to aid in preparing a missile attack on American soil."

== PBS program ==
On April 20, 2007, the Aref/Hossain case was featured on the PBS Documentary "Security Versus Liberty: The Other War," which contained interviews with defense attorneys, the mosque President, and representatives from the FBI and the US Attorney's Office.

== Son of Mountains ==
While he was in Rensselaer County Jail awaiting sentencing, Aref wrote a memoir. Stephen Downs helped him put the story into standard English, and editor Jeanne Finley did further editing. The book was published in March 2008. Son of Mountains is the non-fiction story of the life of Aref, an Iraqi Kurd who grew up under the rule of Saddam Hussein and later risked his life opposing him. Aref traverses the landscape of his childhood in Iraqi Kurdistan under Saddam; details the decision to leave Kurdistan for Syria, where he and his wife and children, although poor, make a new life, and then as UN refugees come to the United States; describes his brief residence in America as an immigrant and imam at a small mosque before his arrest, prosecution, and conviction in the "terror case"; and records his experiences over 18 months at the Rensselaer County Jail.

== Return to Kurdistan ==
Aref returned to Iraqi Kurdistan on June 11, 2019 after finishing his 15-year sentence in October, 2018. When Yassin was released from prison, he didn't want to fight deportation - he was taken to York County Prison (an ICE detention center) to await an eventual flight home to northern Iraq, where his wife and daughters were waiting for him.

After his attorney filed a habeas petition, and a hearing was held in Scranton, PA on June 7, Aref called his son, Salah, on June 9 to say he was being taken to the airport. Aref made it safely home on June 11, 2019. A few days later his two sons flew there, and the family was reunited in freedom for the first time since 2005, before the youngest daughter was born.

On August 4, 2019 Aref's Albany, NY supporters held their annual commemoration of the August 4, 2004 arrests of him and Mohammed Hossain, and Aref spoke to the gathering over video link from Kurdistan. Salah then returned to the US in mid-August, 2019 to start Harvard Law School. On August 30, a long Kurdish TV interview with Aref was aired.
