= Federal Correctional Institution, Ray Brook =

Medium-security prison in New York, US

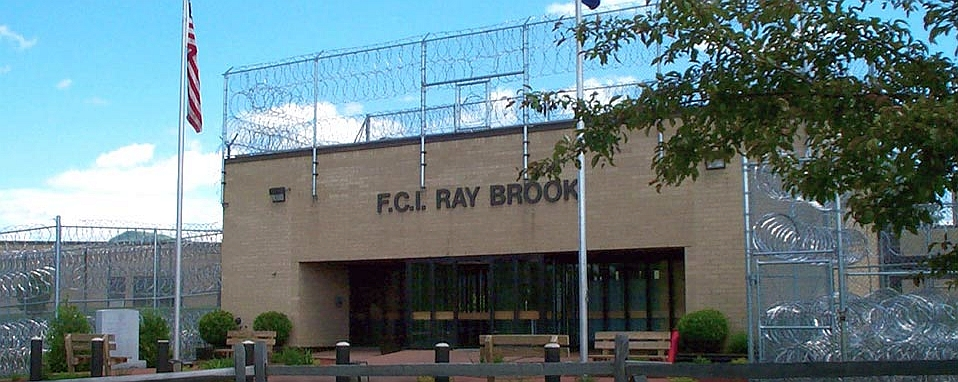
- Interactive map of Federal Correctional Institution, Ray Brook
- Location: North Elba, Essex County, near Saranac Lake, New York; 44°17′25″N 74°05′34″W
- Status: Operational
- Security class: Medium security
- Population: approximately 1,000
- Opened: 1980
- Managed by: Federal Bureau of Prisons
- Warden: David Christensen

The Federal Correctional Institution, Ray Brook (FCI Ray Brook), unofficially called the Olympic Prison, is a medium-security United States federal prison for male inmates that is operated by the Federal Bureau of Prisons, a division of the United States Department of Justice. The prison is located in Ray Brook, a town in Essex County, New York. Although constructed as a prison, it initially served as the Olympic Village for the 1980 Winter Olympics, which were held in Lake Placid.

== History ==
The United States Olympic & Paralympic Committee needed congressional approval for funding to build an Olympic Village for the 1980 Winter Olympics. Congress required an after-use contract for facilities, and Lake Placid's congressman Robert C. McEwen considered the possibilities of having it be repurposed as housing, a hospital, or a permanent athletic facility, but these plans all failed to materialize. As McEwen searched for possibilities, he learned that Norman Carlson of the Federal Bureau of Prisons had congressional approval to build a prison in the Northeastern United States. It was ultimately agreed to create the Village with the goal of repurposing it as a prison.

At the time of construction, the Olympic Village had 937 small cells, each holding between 2 and 4 athletes. The majority of rooms had one barred window, although some had no windows at all, and they had heavy steel doors with peepholes for use by guards after conversion to a functional prison. The Village was surrounded by concentric chain fences. The fences were sensitized and sounded alarms if touched. The only entrance to the village was a surveilled double gate. The village saw widespread condemnation from International Olympic Committees, and multiple countries sought to rent housing in other locations. While National Olympic Committees typically need to pay on their own if they choose to find new accommodation, IOC Director Monique Berlioux said, "This time the accommodations are so poor that delegations will not have to pay for them if they move somewhere else."

The delegations of Sweden, Italy, Austria, East Germany, West Germany, and other countries sought alternative accommodations. This created an unexpected boom in the local real estate market, increasing rent in some areas from US$200 (equivalent to $781.5 in 2025) to US$4,000 (equivalent to $15,630 in 2025). A tenant group called Renters Association of Concerned Citizens on Ousting Our Needed Services (RACCOONS) formed to avoid eviction in the face of the sharp rent increase. A coalition of religious and civil rights activists formed the group Stop the Olympic Prison (STOP) to protest the prison. Sixty-two local Christian clergymen, primarily Protestant, denounced the Village as "morally wrong" and "generally grotesque". Protestors appeared at the Olympic torch relay with signs opposing the prison.

The prison became operational following the conclusion of the Olympics and accepted its first inmates that same year. As of 2016, it housed approximately 1,000 inmates. The majority of inmates come from New York City and Boston. The Bureau of Prisons has received numerous complaints regarding conditions at FCI Ray Brook. In 2013, the United States Court of Appeals for the Second Circuit reinstated a previously dismissed lawsuit filed against the Bureau of Prisons on behalf of six inmates who were allegedly housed in an extremely hot and cramped single room without adequate ventilation and cleaning supplies. The Court found that the evidence justified a claim of cruel and unusual punishment.

In 2025, the prison terminated its contract with the Council of Prison Locals 33 union under the American Federation of Government Employees. Additionally, officers at the prison went unpaid during the 2025 United States federal government shutdown.

== Notable past and present inmates ==
- Eduardo Arellano Félix
- Rezwan Ferdaus
- David Radler
- Sathajhan Sarachandran
- Ja Rule
- Danny Varela

== See also ==
- List of U.S. federal prisons
- List of Olympic Villages
