= Federal Correctional Institution, Berlin =

Medium-security prison in New Hampshire, US

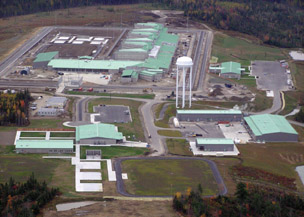
- Interactive map of Federal Correctional Institution, Berlin
- Location: Berlin, New Hampshire; 44°31′21″N 71°08′12″W
- Status: Operational
- Security class: Medium-security (with minimum-security prison camp)
- Opened: 2012
- Managed by: Federal Bureau of Prisons
- Warden: R. Luna

The Federal Correctional Institution, Berlin (FCI Berlin) is a medium-security United States federal prison for male inmates in New Hampshire. It is operated by the Federal Bureau of Prisons, a division of the United States Department of Justice. The facility also has an adjacent satellite prison camp housing minimum-security male inmates.

FCI Berlin is located in Coos County in northern New Hampshire, 115 miles (185 km) north of Concord, New Hampshire, and 95 miles (153 km) northwest of Portland, Maine.

== Facility ==
Construction of FCI Berlin was completed in the fall of 2010. It was built to hold 1,152 medium-security inmates and 128 minimum-security inmates at full capacity. The facility, which cost more than $270 million to build, was completed in November 2010, but did not get activation funds until about a year later, due to Congressional budget stalemates. It officially opened on October 21, 2012, as the Bureau of Prisons' 118th facility, making it one of the newest prisons in the federal system. A ribbon-cutting ceremony was attended by Senator Jeanne Shaheen, Congressman Charles Bass, Berlin Mayor Paul Grenier, and Federal Bureau of Prisons Director Charles E. Samuels, Jr. Shaheen recognized the efforts of former Senator Judd Gregg, who had lobbied for Berlin as a potential federal prison site in the early 2000s while he was governor. The facility was slated to employ 320 staff and expected to pump tens of millions of dollars into the local economy every year. Dr. Deborah Schult was appointed as FCI Berlin's first warden.

In November 2013, Esker "Lee" Tatum was appointed the second warden of FCI Berlin after Schult accepted a position as senior deputy assistant director for the Bureau's Health Services Division. At that time, FCI Berlin was still not operating at full capacity and had not yet been judged compliant with the 531 accreditation standards set by the American Correctional Association (ACA). This was at least partially due to the fact that hiring had been slowed by the sequestration cuts that went into effect March 1, 2013. Tatum expressed that he aimed to have FCI Berlin operating at full capacity and in full compliance with ACA standards by February 2014.

== Notable inmates (current and former) ==
Inmate Name	Register Number	Photo	Status	Details
Jasiel Correia	01205-138		Moved to FCI Ashland. Scheduled to be released in 2026.	Former mayor of Fall River, Massachusetts; convicted in 2021 for extorting cannabis vendors, extortion aiding and abetting, and bribery, and several other charges.
Kent Hovind	06452-017		Released from custody in August 2015; served 8 years.	Founder of Creation Science Evangelism Ministries; convicted in 2006 of tax evasion and tax noncompliance; his wife, Jo Hovind, was also sentenced to prison.

== See also ==
- List of U.S. federal prisons
- Federal Bureau of Prisons
- Incarceration in the United States
