= Abdul Kadir (politician) =

Guyanese politician

Member of the National Assembly
- In office 2001–2006

Mayor of Linden
- In office 1994–1996

Personal details
- Born: Michael Seaforth; 1952 Buxton, Guyana
- Died: June 28, 2018 (aged 65–66)
- Party: People's National Congress Reform
- Spouse: Isha Kadir
- Children: 9
- Parent: Victor Seaforth (father)
- Occupation: Chemical engineer, politician

Abdul Kadir (born Michael Seaforth; 1952 – 28 June 2018) was a Guyanese politician and convicted terrorist. He was a member of Guyana's parliament, the National Assembly and mayor of Guyana's second-largest city, Linden, from 1994 to 1996. A chemical engineer by profession, he served in the National Assembly from 2001 to 2006 as a member of the main opposition party, the People's National Congress Reform. Kadir was convicted and sentenced to life in prison for an alleged Islamist terrorist bomb plot in New York City.

== Biography ==
Born Michael Seaforth in Buxton, Guyana, he was the son of Victor Seaforth. He converted to Islam in 1974, and changed his name to Abdul Kadir. He and his wife Isha, both Shia Muslims, had nine children and 18 grandchildren.

In 2007, Kadir was arrested in Trinidad in connection with a plot to blow up jet-fuel supply tanks and pipeline at John F. Kennedy International Airport, New York City. He was arrested 2 June while en route to Caracas, Venezuela, where he planned to pick up a visa in order to attend an Islamic conference in Iran. Also implicated in the plot were Russell Defreitas, a Guyanese-American, Kareem Ibrahim of Trinidad, and Abdel Nur of Guyana. The United States government alleged that Kadir and Nur were associated with the Trinidad-based Jamaat al Muslimeen, a militant Muslim group. Kadir was arrested in Trinidad and Tobago; he was extradited to the United States. On 2 August 2010, Kadir – along with Russell Defreitas – was convicted in a jury trial for the JFK airport bomb plot. According to U.S. court documents, Kadir was the disciple of Mohsen Rabbani, an Iranian diplomat accused of being one of the masterminds behind the 1994 AMIA bombing in Buenos Aires. Kadir was sentenced to life imprisonment.

Kadir died in prison on 28 June 2018.

On 26 April 2019, a controversial sympathy motion passed in the National Assembly, when Valarie Adams-Yearwood (Minister of Communities) moved the motion, calling Kadir a "great man" along with support from Audwin Rutherford. Adams-Yearwood and Rutherford both hail from Linden. People's Progressive Party, the opposition party, condemned the motion and walked out, leaving the motion to pass unopposed. A statement from the US embassy called it "insensitive and thoughtless" and a statement from the Canadian high commission was "disappointed" by the tribute to Kadir. The government of Guyana responded to the criticism, regretting the interpretation of the motion, saying the honor is given to all who served in the National Assembly, and reiterated their stance against terrorism.
