= Mohammed Mosharref Hossain =

Bangladeshi criminal

- Born: Bangladesh
- Occupations: Proprietor of an Albany New York pizza parlour; Founder of the Masjid As-Salam mosque in Albany, NY
- Conviction: Guilty
- Criminal charges: Conspiring to aid a terrorist group and provide support for a weapon of mass destruction, as well as money-laundering and supporting a foreign terrorist organization, Jaish-e-Mohammed.
- Penalty: 15 years in prison

Mohammed Mosharref Hossain is the proprietor of an Albany New York pizza parlour, and a founder of the Masjid As-Salam mosque in Albany, who was arrested by Federal authorities on August 6, 2004, as part of a counter-terrorism sting. Hossain and an associate, Yassin M. Aref, were convicted of conspiring to aid a terrorist group, supporting a foreign terrorist organization, and money-laundering, and sentenced to 15 years in jail. In July 2008 the appellate court upheld the convictions, rejecting all of the defense's arguments.

Hossain was born in Bangladesh.

The Albany Times Union reports that US forces found Aref's name, address, and phone number in a notebook found in a bombed out Iraqi encampment.^{[1]}

The FBI sent an informer to make contact with Aref through Hossain, to try to get them to participate in an illegal arms deal.

The Times Union reported that their lawyers filed motions to learn whether the pair were subjected to warrantless surveillance by the NSA. Normally the NSA is not authorized to conduct electronic surveillance of Americans, only foreign nationals.^{[1]} However, in December 2005, the New York Times revealed that President Bush had taken the controversial step of secretly authorizing the NSA to expand its surveillance to within the United States. Bush claimed that the US Constitution empowered him to authorize warrantless wiretaps when the US Congress granted him the authority to use force in Iraq.

According to their lawyers, if it is determined that President Bush's authorization of warrantless wiretaps were unconstitutional, and Aref had been investigated through warrantless wiretaps, the prosecution's case would be "jeopardized".^{[1]}

A grand jury indicted Hossain and Aref on October 1, 2005. He was convicted of conspiring to aid a terrorist group, supporting a foreign terrorist organization, and money-laundering, and sentenced to 15 years in jail.

In June 2020, Mohammed Hossain, who was imprisoned for nearly 15 years following his arrest for money laundering in a 2004 FBI militant operation, would leave federal jail early after a federal judge approved his legal appeal for early release.
