= Farooque Ahmed =

Pakistani-American (born 1976)

- فاروق احمد
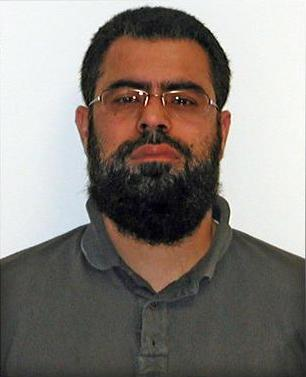
- U.S. Department of Justice photo of Ahmed
- Born: 1976 (age 49–50); Lahore, Punjab, Pakistan
- Citizenship: United States, formerly Pakistan
- Education: College of Staten Island
- Employer: Ericsson
- Status: Convicted
- Convictions: Attempting to provide material support to a designated foreign terrorist organization Collecting information to assist in planning a terrorist attack on a transit facility
- Penalty: 23 years in prison 50 years of supervised release

Details
- Target: Arlington Cemetery Metrorail station
- Weapon: Bomb
- Date apprehended: October 27, 2010
- Imprisoned at: FCI Allenwood (Medium), US

Farooque Ahmed (Urdu: فاروق احمد; born 1976) is a Pakistani-American from Ashburn, Virginia who was arrested by the Federal Bureau of Investigation for plotting to bomb Washington Metro stations at Arlington Cemetery, Pentagon City, Crystal City, and Court House. He was charged with attempting to provide material support to a designated terrorist organization, collecting information to assist in planning a terrorist attack on a transit facility, and attempting to provide material support to terrorists. On April 11, 2011, he was sentenced to 23 years in prison after pleading guilty.

== Background ==
Ahmed was born in Lahore, Pakistan, and became a U.S. citizen in 2002. He has lived in the US since 1993. He holds a bachelor's degree in Computer Science from the College of Staten Island and worked as a network design contractor for Ericsson. He was enrolled in an online degree in risk management from Aspen University. He is married and has a son. He has a history of several speeding violations and credit problems. At his initial court appearance, he claimed that he could not afford a lawyer.

== Arrest ==
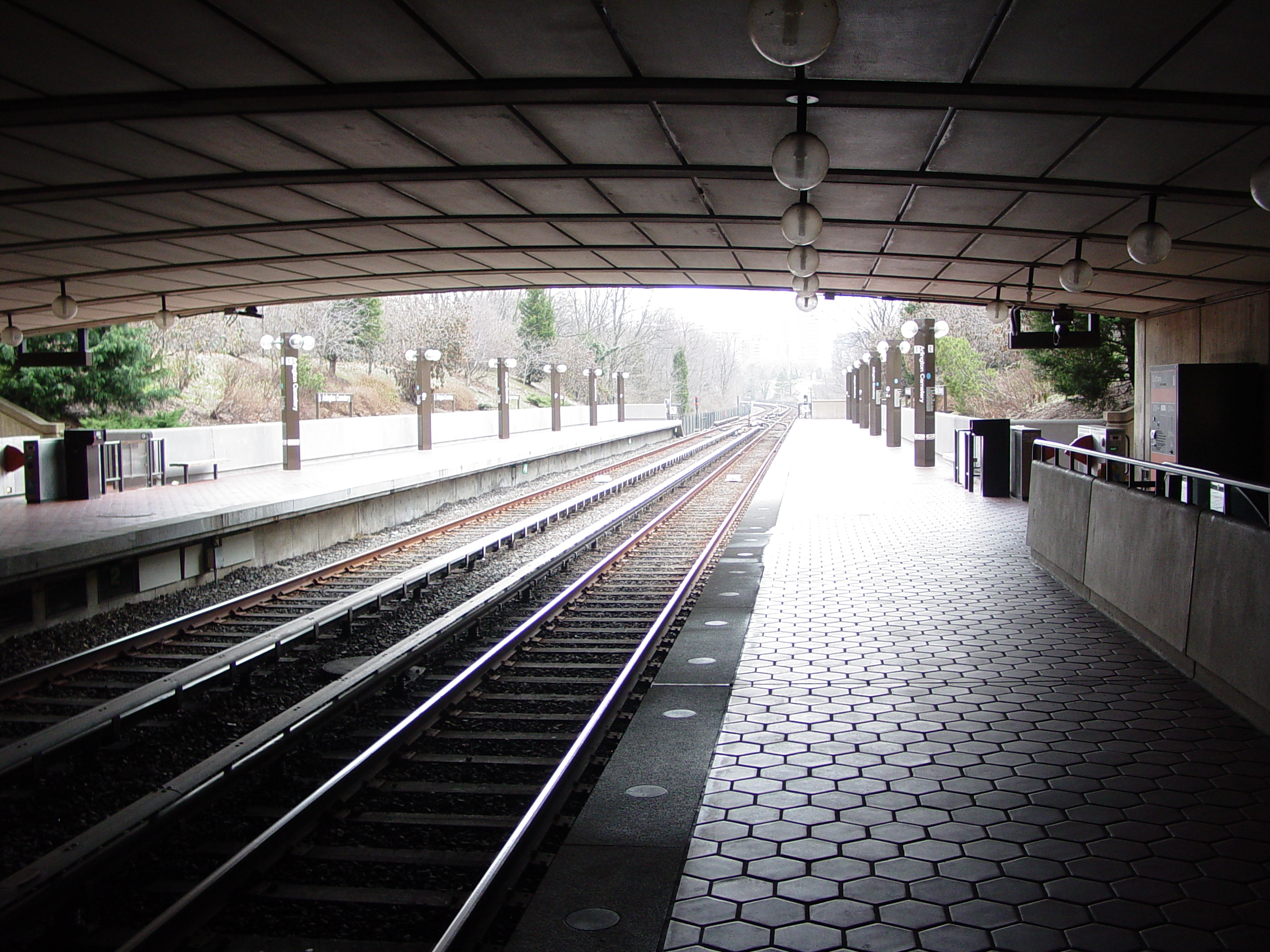
Arlington Cemetery (WMATA station), which was scouted by Ahmed

According to the White House press secretary, Barack Obama was made aware of Ahmed's activities prior to his arrest. Ahmed was arrested early on October 27, 2010. He was accused of scouting the Metrorail station in Arlington County, Virginia and recording video of the station on four occasions. In July, he handed over the footage to an individual who he believed to be an operative of Al-Qaeda. According to the indictment, he told undercover agents that an attack would cause most casualties between 4:00 p.m. and 5:00 p.m. and suggested placing the bombs in rolling suitcases. The plan of attack began as early as April 18, 2010, according to officials.

He also told undercover agents that he would be ready to conduct jihad against America in January 2011 after completing Hajj in November 2010. At the time of his arrest, it did not appear that Ahmed had received any militant training overseas from Al-Qaeda or its associates. He told operatives that he was willing to martyr himself and had taught himself martial arts, use of firearms, and knife and gun tactics, skills he offered to teach others.

== Sentencing ==
On April 11, 2011, Ahmed was sentenced to 23 years in prison after pleading guilty to attempting to provide material support to a designated foreign terrorist organization and collecting information to assist in planning a terrorist attack on a transit facility. As a part of a plea bargain, the prosecutors dropped one of the charges and Ahmed who had faced up to 50 years in prison agreed to a 23-year sentence.

== See also ==
- Amine El Khalifi
- David Headley
- Faisal Shahzad
- Rezwan Ferdaus
- Sami Osmakac
