= Arlington Cemetery station =

Washington Metro station in Virginia, US

Arlington Cemetery
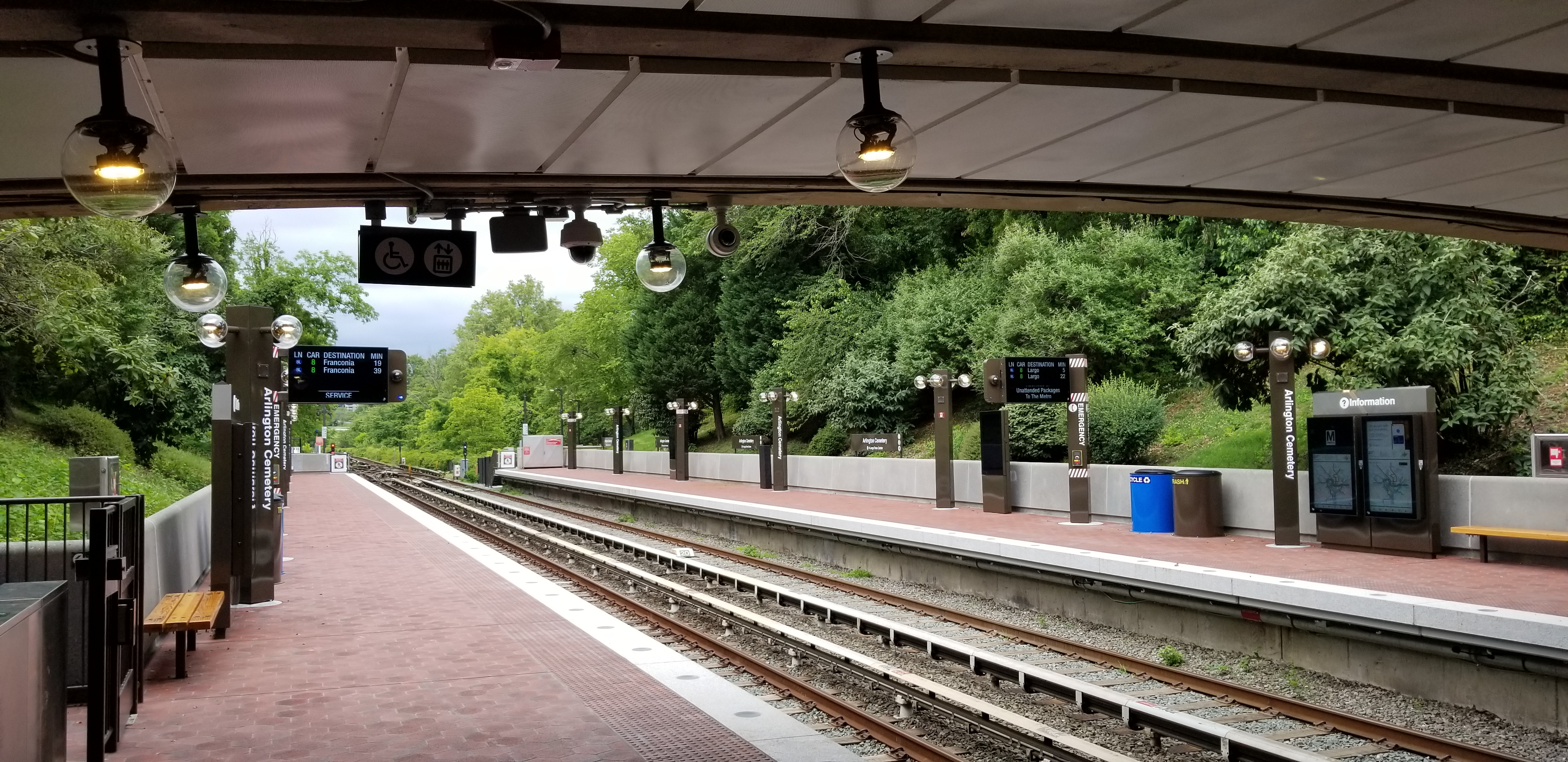
- Station platforms in June 2021 following spring 2021 rehabilitations

General information
- Location: 1000 North Memorial Drive; Arlington, Virginia
- Coordinates: 38°53′4.5″N 77°3′47.1″W
- Owner: Washington Metropolitan Area Transit Authority
- Platforms: 2 side platforms
- Tracks: 2

Construction
- Structure type: Below-grade
- Cycle facilities: Capital Bikeshare
- Accessible: Yes

Other information
- Station code: C06

History
- Opened: July 1, 1977; 49 years ago
- Rebuilt: 2021

Passengers
- 2025: 845 (average weekday)
- Rank: 95 of 98

Services
Preceding station	Washington Metro	Following station
Pentagon toward Franconia–Springfield	Blue Line	Rosslyn toward Downtown Largo
Route map
Location

Arlington Cemetery station is a side platformed Washington Metro station in Arlington County, Virginia, United States. The station was opened on July 1, 1977, and is operated by the Washington Metropolitan Area Transit Authority (WMATA). The station provides service for only the Blue Line, and is located at the entrance to Arlington National Cemetery, underneath Memorial Drive. It is the only station that closes earlier than the rest of the system, closing at 7 PM from October to March and at 10 PM from April to September.

The station is one of three stations to be exclusively serviced by the Blue Line. The rest of the Blue Line's stations are shared with the Yellow Line to the south (except for two of the southernmost stations) and with the Orange Line and Silver Line to the north.

== History ==
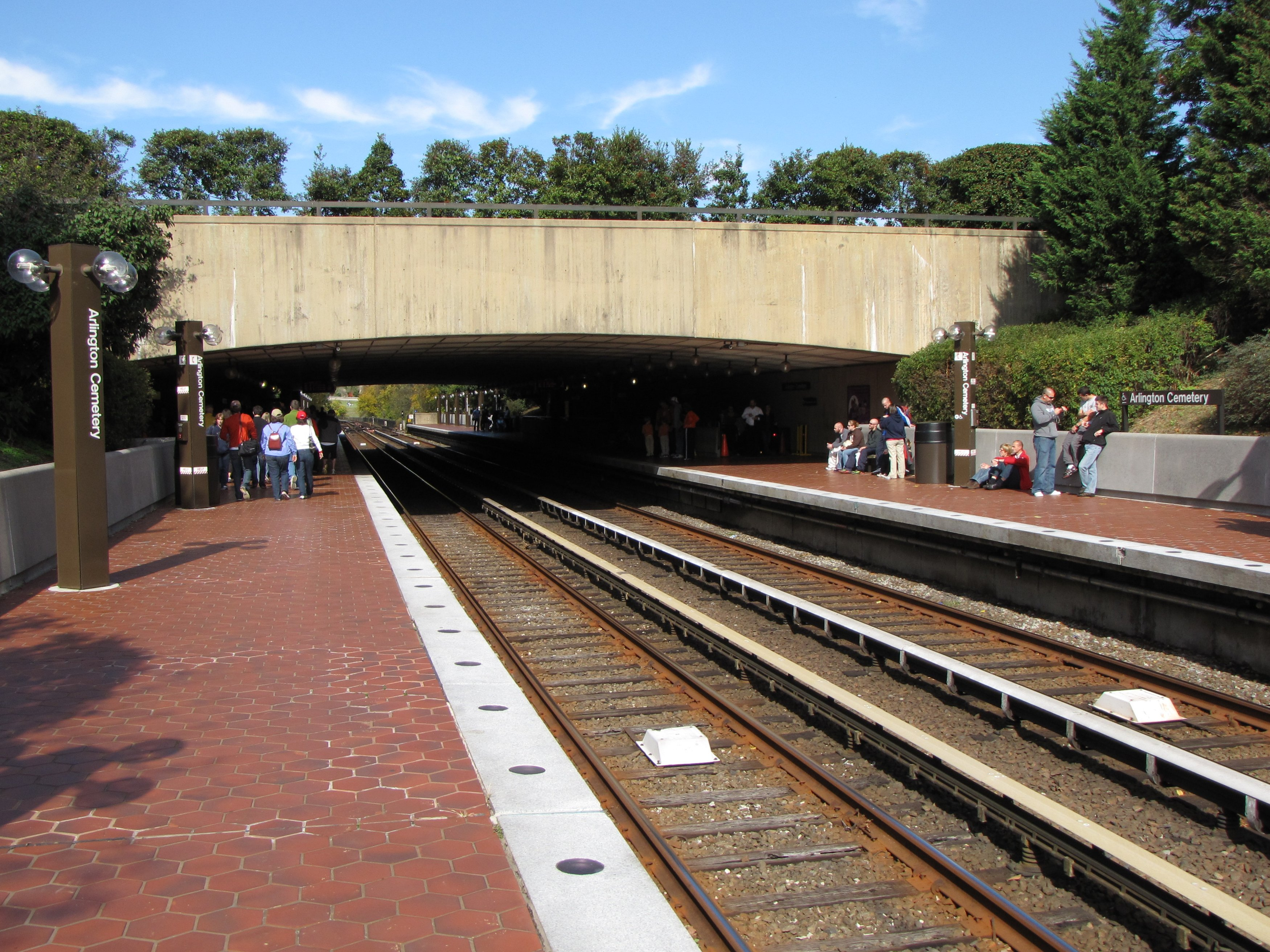
View from outbound end of station, showing bridge carrying Memorial Drive over the station

The station opened on July 1, 1977. Its opening coincided with the completion of 11.8 miles (19.0 km) of rail between National Airport and RFK Stadium and the opening of the Capitol South, Crystal City, Eastern Market, Farragut West, Federal Center SW, Federal Triangle, Foggy Bottom–GWU, L'Enfant Plaza, McPherson Square, National Airport, Pentagon, Pentagon City, Potomac Avenue, Rosslyn, Smithsonian, and Stadium–Armory stations.

In May 2018, Metro announced an extensive renovation of platforms at twenty stations across the system. The platforms at the Arlington Cemetery station were rebuilt from February 13 to May 23, 2021.

On March 19, 2020, this station closed in response to the COVID-19 pandemic. The station reopened on August 23, 2020.

Between January 15 to January 21, 2021, this station was closed because of security concerns related to the 2021 Inauguration.

Canopies above the escalators between street level and the mezzanine were installed beginning in June 2023. The canopies shield customers and escalators from the elements, helping protect the escalators and extend their service life and reliability. The project is expected to be completed in fall 2026.

== Station layout ==
Arlington Cemetery is located just below ground level and only covered by a bridge carrying Memorial Drive over the station. Escalators connect both the north and south sides of Memorial Drive with a mezzanine below the platforms, where customers pass through fare control. Escalators on the other side of fare control connect passengers to the side platforms. Elevators go directly between the street level and the platforms, bypassing the mezzanine, with one fare gate for each elevator at platform level.

== Notable places nearby ==
- Arlington House (also known as the Custis-Lee Mansion)
- Arlington Memorial Bridge
- Arlington National Cemetery
- Lady Bird Johnson Park
- Lincoln Memorial
- Tomb of the Unknown Soldier
- Women in Military Service for America Memorial
