= Sami Osmakac =

American convicted in the U.S. of plotting terrorist attacks

- Born: December 28, 1986; Lubizhdë, Prizren, AP Kosovo, SFR Yugoslavia
- Other name: Abdul Samia
- Occupation: Unemployed
- Height: 5 ft 9 in (175 cm)
- Status: Incarcerated at USP McCreary, scheduled for release on April 29, 2046
- Motive: Retaliation for wrongdoings against Muslims
- Convictions: Attempted use of a weapon of mass destruction Possession of an unregistered automatic firearm
- Criminal charges: One count of attempted use of a weapon of mass destruction One count of possession of an unregistered automatic firearm
- Penalty: 40 years in prison, and forfeiture of property used to facilitate offenses

Sami Osmakac (born December 28, 1986) is an American convicted by a jury on June 10, 2014, following a criminal trial in U.S. District Court, of plotting terrorist attacks in and near Tampa, Florida.

== Background ==
Osmakac, an Albanian and a naturalized U.S. citizen, was arrested January 7, 2012, for his plot. He intended to bomb nightclubs, detonate a car bomb, fire an assault rifle, wear an explosive belt in a crowded area, and take hostages.

Osmakac recorded an eight-minute video prior to his arrest describing the planned attack as retribution for wrongs committed against Muslims. The Federal Bureau of Investigation claimed Osmakac bought explosives and firearms from an undercover agent. He had been under investigation since September 2011, when a confidential source informed federal authorities that Osmakac walked into a business seeking al-Qaeda flags.

Osmakac appeared in videos posted to an extremist YouTube nom de guerre "Abu Samia", in which he condemned other religions and secular Muslims. Osmakac was kicked out of two mosques in the Tampa Bay area and reported to the FBI by a Muslim acquaintance. The FBI then set up a sting operation, supplying Osmakac, who could not even afford to fix the car he intended to drive, with money to purchase weapons and a video camera stolen from Best Buy to make his video. They gave money to Abdul Dabus, who was both Osmakac's employer and the confidential source that reported him, and had him instruct Osmakac to give the money to the undercover agent as a "down payment." The agent then instructed Sami in the use of the fake weapons, and helped him plant a fake car bomb and arrange transport to a hotel where he was supposed to detonate a suicide vest. His brother, Avni, later remarked, "my brother was mentally ill. We were trying to get him help. The FBI got to him first."

== Legal proceedings ==
During the trial, Osmakac's defense argued that the FBI took advantage of his radical Islamic beliefs, mental illness, and destitution to entrap him into trying to commit a crime. The court responded that, "A reduction to a defendant's sentence is only warranted, however, if the sting operation involved 'extraordinary misconduct.' United States v. Ciszkowski, 492 F.3d 1264, 1271 (11th Cir. 2007). The party raising the defense ... bears the 'burden of establishing that the government's conduct is sufficiently reprehensible.'" On November 5, 2014, Osmakac was sentenced to 40 years in prison. Osmakac attempted to appeal his sentence but the United States Court of Appeals for the Eleventh Circuit confirmed his conviction and sentence in 2017.

== Related media ==
- How The FBI Created A Terrorist (Video production). #FreeSpeechZone. Alyona Minkovski. TheHuffingtonPost.com, Inc. March 18, 2015.
