= Faisal Shahzad =

American convicted terrorist (born 1979)

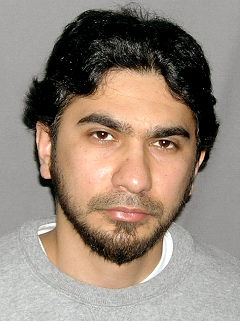
- Mugshot of Faisal Shahzad in 2010
- Born: June 30, 1979 (age 47); Karachi, Pakistan
- Citizenship: American, formerly Pakistani
- Education: University of Bridgeport
- Occupation: Former financial analyst
- Known for: Perpetrator of the 2010 Times Square car bomb attempt
- Height: 5 ft 11 in (1.80 m)
- Spouse: Huma Asif Mian
- Children: 2
- Parent: Air Vice Marshal (Retd) Baharul Haq (father)
- Status: Incarcerated
- Convictions: Attempted use of a weapon of mass destruction Conspiracy to use a weapon of mass destruction Use of a firearm during a crime of violence Attempted act of terrorism transcending national boundaries Conspiracy to commit an act of terrorism transcending national boundaries Attempted use of a destructive device during a crime of violence Transportation of an explosive Conspiracy to transport an explosive Attempted destruction of property by fire and explosives Conspiracy to destroy property by fire and explosives
- Penalty: Life imprisonment without the possibility of parole

Details
- Imprisoned at: ADX Florence

Faisal Shahzad (Urdu: فیصل شہزاد; born June 30, 1979) is a Pakistani-American man who was arrested for the attempted May 1, 2010, Times Square car bombing. On June 21, 2010, in Federal District Court in Manhattan, he confessed to 10 counts arising from the bombing attempt. Throughout his court appearance, Shahzad was unrepentant. The United States Attorney indicated there was no plea deal, so Shahzad faced the maximum sentence, a mandatory life term.

Shahzad was arrested approximately 53 hours after the attempt, at 11:45 p.m. EDT on May 3, 2010, by U.S. Customs and Border Protection officers. He was arrested at John F. Kennedy International Airport, after boarding Emirates Flight 202 to Dubai. His final destination had been Islamabad, Pakistan.

A federal complaint was filed on May 4, 2010 alleging that Shahzad committed five terrorism-related crimes, including the attempted use of a weapon of mass destruction. Shahzad waived his constitutional right to a speedy hearing.

Shahzad has reportedly implicated himself in the crimes, and has given information to authorities since his arrest. Shahzad admitted to receiving training in bomb-making at a camp run by the Taliban in the Waziristan region in Pakistan along the Afghan border. As of May 7, 2010, Shahzad was continuing to answer questions and provide intelligence to investigators. Pakistani officials have arrested more than a dozen people in connection with the plot.

After pleading guilty to a 10-count indictment in June, on October 5, 2010, Shahzad was sentenced to life imprisonment without the possibility of parole; the charges had included attempted conspiracy to use a weapon of mass destruction and attempting an act of a terrorist attack.

Shahzad is married and the father of two children, both born in the United States. Since 1997, he had lived mostly in the United States, attending college on extended visas, and earning an undergraduate degree and an MBA at the University of Bridgeport in Bridgeport, Connecticut. He worked for two major companies, Arden and Affinion Group (2006-2009), as a financial analyst before quitting his jobs. He separated from his wife, Huma Mian, in 2009 and she returned with their children to her parents in Dhahran, Saudi Arabia.

== Biography ==
=== Early life and education ===
Shahzad is a naturalized U.S. citizen. He was born in Pakistan in either Karachi or Pabbi (a village in Nowshera District east of Peshawar in northwest Pakistan), the youngest of four children. His father was born in the village of Mohib Banda (near Peshawar). Shahzad comes from a wealthy, well-educated family in northwest Pakistan.

Shahzad's father, Baharul Haq, lives in the Peshawar suburb of Hayatabad. His father was a senior official in the Pakistan Air Force, holding the rank of air vice-marshal (the equivalent of a two-star general) before leaving the air force in 1992. His children grew up in privilege. He is a deputy director general of the Civil Aviation Authority of Pakistan. He had begun as a common airman, but became a fighter pilot excelling in aerobatics, and was posted in England and Jeddah, Saudi Arabia.

Shahzad is probably of mixed ethnic background because the Government of Pakistan stated that he is of Kashmiri descent but Shahzad identified himself as Pashtun.

The New York Times reported that Shahzad's life seems to have followed a

"familiar narrative about radicalization in the West: his anger toward his adopted country seemed to have grown in lockstep with his personal struggles. He had lost his home to foreclosure last year. At the same time he was showing signs of a profound, religiously infused alienation."

Shahzad's family moved with his father's military postings, and the boy attended primary school in Saudi Arabia, according to documents found outside his Shelton home. He later attended several schools in Pakistan. In high school, he received Ds in English composition and microeconomics. While he was growing up, the family had servants, chauffeurs, and armed guards in keeping with his father's military rank.

Kifayat Ali, a man who said he is a cousin of Shahzad's father, insisted that Shahzad's family had no political affiliations. He said the arrest of Shahzad appeared to be a "conspiracy so that the [Americans] can bomb more Pashtuns", and that Shahzad "was never linked to any political or religious party [in Pakistan]".

Shahzad studied for five semesters in 1997 and 1998 at the now-defunct Southeastern University in Washington D.C., where he took mostly business classes. He received several Cs and Ds, an F in basic statistics, and a grade point average of 2.78. In December 1998, he was granted an F-1 student visa. In 1999 he was placed on a US Customs (later merged into DHS) travel lookout list called the "Traveler Enforcement Compliance System".

In 2000, Shahzad transferred to the University of Bridgeport in Bridgeport, Connecticut. On weekends, he would go to Bengali-themed nightclubs in New York City. A classmate remembered Shahzad watching news footage of the September 11 attacks in New York, and saying, "They had it coming." He participated in a wider world than some Pakistanis, and was said to love women and to drink socially. Shahzad earned a B.A. in computer applications and information systems from the University of Bridgeport, and his parents attended his graduation on May 13, 2002. Just before graduation, in April 2002, he was granted an H1-B visa for skilled workers. Shahzad remained in the U.S. for three years on that visa, earning a Master of Business Administration degree at the University of Bridgeport in 2005.

=== Career ===
Shahzad worked as a junior financial analyst in the accounting department at the Elizabeth Arden cosmetics company in Stamford, Connecticut, while he was still working on his master's degree. After working with them from January 2002 and until June 15, 2006, he resigned to go elsewhere. He complained to friends that the company never raised his salary above $50,000.

=== Personal life ===
On December 24, 2004, in an arranged marriage in Peshawar, Pakistan, Shahzad married Huma Asif Mian. They have two children.

Huma Asif Mian, a 2004 graduate of the University of Colorado, Boulder, majored in accounting. Mian was born in the United States to Pakistani-born parents. Mian and her parents and siblings had lived in Qatar and Colorado. At the time of Shahzad's arrest, Mian lived with her parents and her two children fathered by Shahzad in Saudi Arabia. Mian's father is Mohammad Asif Mian, a petroleum engineering expert. He has written a number of books and technical manuals, including a best-selling book on project economics and decision analysis; worked for companies such as Saudi Aramco and Qatar General Petroleum; and has two master's degrees from the Colorado School of Mines in Golden, Colorado. After Shahzad was arrested, his father-in-law Mohammad Asif Mian said: "to go to this extreme, this is unbelievable. He has lovely children. Two really lovely children. As a father I would not be able to afford to lose my children."

In 2002, Shahzad bought a Mercedes automobile and a $205,000 condominium in Norwalk, Connecticut. He sold the condo in May 2004 to George LaMonica for a $56,000 profit. LaMonica was interviewed afterward by Joint Terrorism Task Force investigators regarding details of the transactions and information about Shahzad.

In January 2006, Shahzad was granted permanent residence status (a "green card"). He bought a new single-family three-bedroom home in Shelton, Connecticut, just outside Bridgeport in 2006, at which he and his family lived. From mid-June 2006 to June 2009, Shahzad worked as a junior financial analyst, a position he told a friend paid $70,000, for Affinion Group, an affinity marketing and consulting business then located at 100 Connecticut Avenue, Norwalk.

He was naturalized as a U.S. citizen on April 17, 2009. A few weeks later, he abruptly quit his job and stopped making payments on his house, defaulting on the $218,400 mortgage.

His marriage became strained in 2009 as he pressured his wife Huma to wear a hijab and insisted that the family return to live in Pakistan while he searched for a job in the Middle East. On June 2, he telephoned his wife from John F. Kennedy International Airport in Queens, saying he was leaving for Pakistan, and it was her choice whether or not to follow him. She refused, and actually left the United States herself, taking their children with her to live with her parents in Dhahran, Saudi Arabia.

Shahzad defaulted on the mortgage of his house, and was sued by the bank in September 2009 as it foreclosed on his home.

The New York Times reported that since 2006, he had become more religiously devout and struggled with questions about Muslims in the world. He began to pray five times a day, at mosques in Stamford, Norwalk, and Bridgeport. On February 25, 2006, Shahzad had sent a long e-mail message to a number of friends. Writing that he understood that Islam forbids killing innocents, he asked those who insisted on peaceful protest, "Can you tell me a way to save the oppressed? And a way to fight back when rockets are fired at us and Muslim blood flows? Everyone knows how the Muslim country bows down to pressure from west. Everyone knows the kind of humiliation we are faced with around the globe."

== Attempted bombing of Times Square ==
=== Reported preparations ===
On July 3, 2009, Shahzad reportedly traveled to Pakistan and is believed to have visited Peshawar, a gateway to the militant-occupied tribal regions of Pakistan and stayed there from July 7 to July 22. While in Pakistan, he said he trained at a terrorist training camp in what was believed to be Waziristan, according to law enforcement officials. Time suggested that his family's background in northwestern Pakistan meant that Shahzad likely spoke Pashto, a rare asset for a Western volunteer in the training camps.

Shahzad's most recent stay in Pakistan lasted for five months; he returned to the U.S. on February 3, 2010, on an Emirates flight from Dubai.

Shahzad was believed to have bought the 1993 Nissan Pathfinder that was used in the car bomb attempt within three weeks prior to the incident. The vehicle was purchased through an ad on Craigslist, for $1,300. Shahzad reportedly paid a Connecticut woman for it in $100 bills. He paid the money and received the car at a Connecticut shopping center, without any formal paperwork being exchanged.

=== Arrest and charges ===
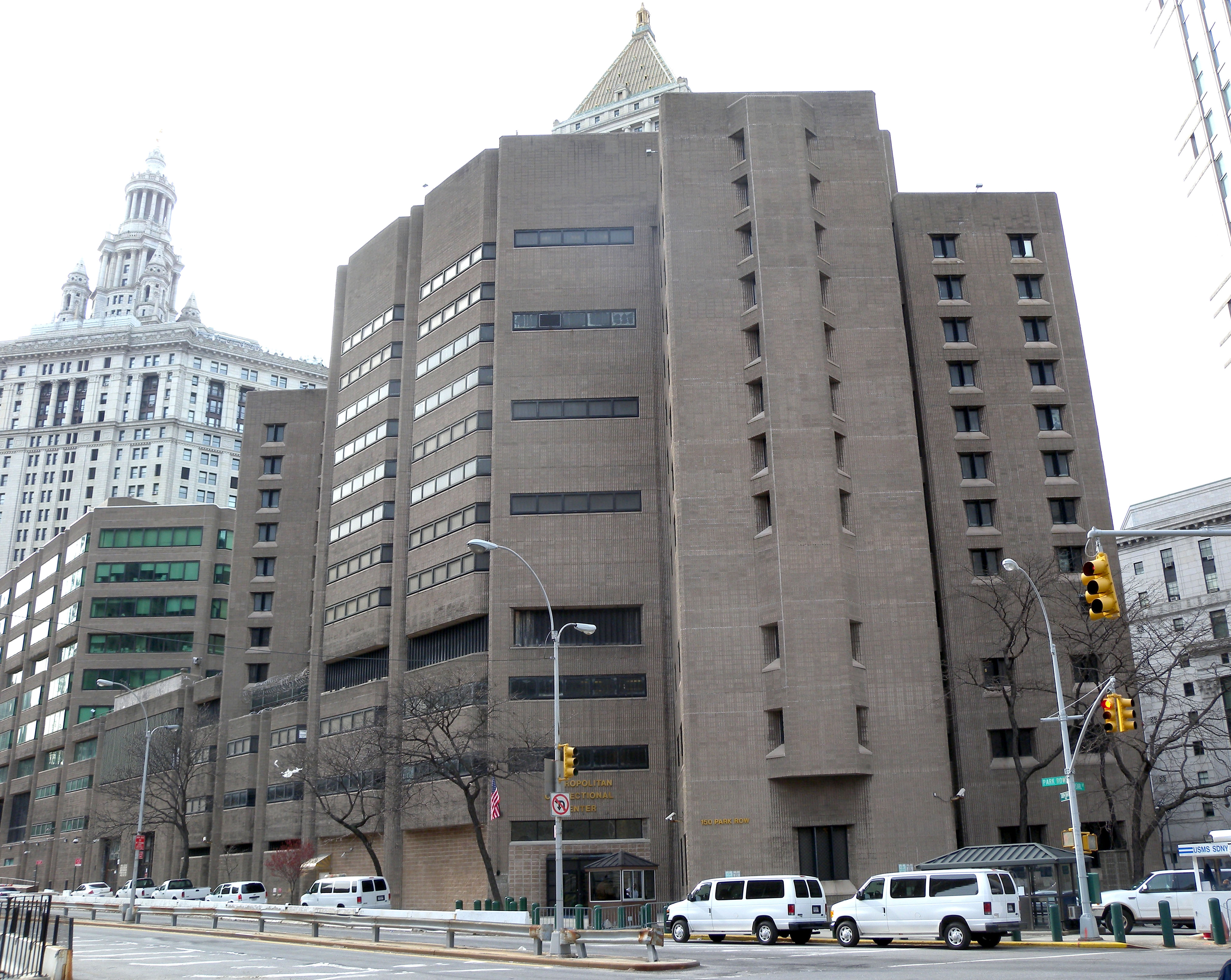
Metropolitan Correctional Center, New York, where Shahzad was held shortly after his arrest

Shahzad was arrested approximately 53 hours after the incident, at 11:45 p.m. EDT on May 3, 2010, by U.S. Customs and Border Protection officers. He was taken into custody at John F. Kennedy International Airport, as he sat on board Emirates Flight 202 to Dubai. His flight was minutes from takeoff but was recalled to the gate. His final destination would have been Islamabad, Pakistan.

Lapses in security allowed Shahzad to board the plane. He had been placed on the no-fly list on Monday, May 3 at 12:30 p.m. when investigators became more certain he was a suspect in the bombing attempt two days before. Investigators lost track of Shahzad before he drove to the airport on the evening of May 3, and did not know he was planning to leave the country. Emirates airline agents did not check the no-fly list for added names at 6:30 p.m. when Shahzad made a reservation, or at 7:35 p.m. when he purchased the ticket at the airport with cash. Shahzad was later allowed to board the plane. A routine post-boarding check at 11:00 p.m. revealed that Shahzad was on the no-fly list. Within minutes, agents recalled the plane to the gate, boarded the plane, and arrested him.

Shortly after the arrest, U.S. Attorney General Eric Holder said, "Based on what we know so far, it is clear that this was a terrorist plot aimed at murdering Americans in one of the busiest places in our country". Holder later said that Shahzad had admitted involvement in the incident, and that he was providing useful information.

According to Deputy FBI Director John Pistole, Shahzad was initially interrogated under the public safety exception to the Miranda rule and cooperated with authorities. He was later read his Miranda rights, and continued to cooperate and provide information.

The FBI and NYPD searched Shahzad's Bridgeport, Connecticut home on May 4, at Sheridan Street and Boston Avenue, removing filled plastic bags. Materials related to the bomb were found in his apartment, including boxes that had contained the alarm clocks. His car at the airport held a 9 mm Kel-Tec SUB-2000 carbine with five full magazines of ammunition, according to law enforcement officials.

The complaint filed in federal court on May 4, 2010, charged Shahzad with five counts of terrorism-related crimes. He faced up to life in prison.

On May 9, Attorney General Holder announced pending Obama Administration Miranda-warning legislation in the context of the Shahzad case. On June 21, Shahzad pleaded guilty to all the charges against him.

=== International ties and investigation ===
It was reported that Pakistani authorities arrested a number of suspects in the investigation of the attempted car bombing, including two or three people at a house in Pakistan where Shahzad is said to have stayed. Pakistani intelligence officials said a man named Tauseef, a friend of Shahzad, was detained in Karachi in connection with the case. Representative Jane Harman, a California Democrat, said Pakistani officials arrested "alleged facilitators" as part of a "far broader investigation".

According to The Wall Street Journal, Shahzad received bomb-making training from the Pakistani Taliban. The Pakistani Taliban are made up overwhelmingly of Pashtun tribesmen. According to CBS News, Shahzad has been on the Department of Homeland Security travel lookout list since 1999 because he has been bringing in large amounts of cash (approximately $80,000) into the United States.

Attorney General Holder said "the Pakistani Taliban was behind the attack. We know that they helped facilitate it. We know that they probably helped finance it and that he was working at their direction".

Shahzad told interrogators that he was "inspired by" the radical cleric, Anwar al-Awlaki, to take up the cause of al-Qaeda. Via the Internet, Shahzad contacted al-Awlaki, Baitullah Mehsud, of the Pakistan Taliban (who was killed in a drone strike in 2009); and a web of jihadists, ABC News reported.

According to a report of Al Arabiya, Shahzad had recorded a suicide video in which he declared that he planned the attack as revenge for the U.S. war in Afghanistan. In this video, made before his attempted May 1 attack, Shahzad was dressed in traditional, tribal Pashtun clothing and was sitting with an assault rifle.

"The attack on the United States will be a revenge for all the mujahideen and oppressed Muslims," Shahzad said in the tape, according to Al-Arabiya. "Eight years have passed since the Afghanistan war and you shall see how the Muslim war has just begun and how Islam will spread across the world."

=== Conviction ===
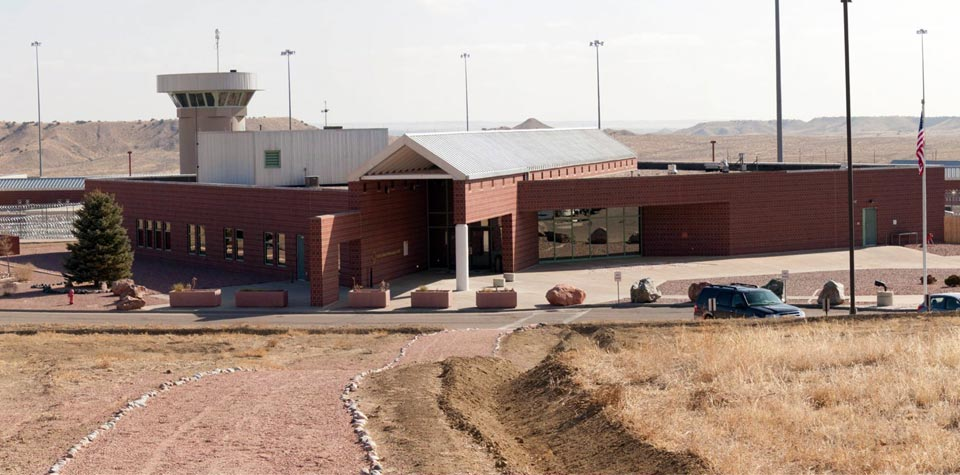
Shahzad is incarcerated at USP Florence ADMAX, pictured here

On October 5, 2010, Shahzad was convicted and sentenced by federal judge Miriam Goldman Cedarbaum of the Southern District of New York to life imprisonment without the possibility of parole. When asked by the judge, "Didn't you swear allegiance to this country?" Shahzad, a naturalized U.S. citizen, replied, "I sweared, but I didn't mean it." Shahzad, wearing a white prayer cap, smiled and said "Allahu Akbar" after hearing his sentence. He said he would "sacrifice a thousand lives for Allah." He claimed that "War with Muslims has just begun," and that "the defeat of the US is imminent, inshallah [God willing]."

Shahzad responded to a judge asking about his justification for the bombing, saying that US drone strikes "don't see children, they don't see anybody. They kill women, children, they kill everybody." Shahzad is serving his life sentence at ADX Florence, a supermax facility in Colorado where the most dangerous male inmates in the US federal prison system are held. It is part of the Florence Federal Correctional Complex.

== See also ==
- David Headley, Chicago-based Pakistani-American who conspired with Lashkar-e-Taiba and Pakistani ex-military officers to launch the 2008 Mumbai attacks
- Aafia Siddiqui, U.S.-educated Pakistani and al-Qaeda member, arrested in Afghanistan and convicted in February 2010 of attempted murder and armed assault
- Najibullah Zazi, U.S. resident and al-Qaeda member, pleaded guilty in 2010 of planning suicide bombings of New York City subway
- Operation Arabian Knight, 2010 arrest of two American citizens from New Jersey on terrorism charges
- D.C. Five, five Americans charged by Pakistan in 2010 with terrorism-related offenses
- Farooque Ahmed, Pakistani American arrested for plotting bombing of Washington Metro
- Domestic terrorism
