= United States Penitentiary, Hazelton =

American federal prison in West Virginia

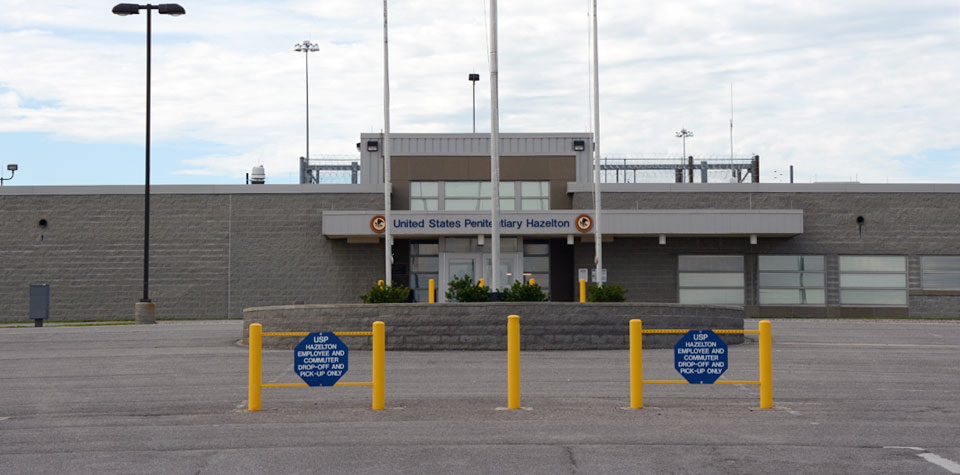
- Interactive map of United States Penitentiary, Hazelton
- Location: Preston County, West Virginia, U.S.; 39°40′21″N 79°29′54″W
- Status: Operational
- Population: 1,675 [1,583 at the USP, 92 in prison camp] (September 2023)
- Opened: 2004
- Managed by: Federal Bureau of Prisons
- Warden: Bryan M. Antonelli

The United States Penitentiary, Hazelton (USP Hazelton) is a high-security United States federal prison for men in West Virginia. The high-security facility, which opened in 2004, has earned the nickname "Misery Mountain" by the inmates who are incarcerated there. It is operated by the Federal Bureau of Prisons, a division of the United States Department of Justice. The facility has a satellite prison camp for minimum-security male offenders.

The facility is located in an unincorporated area of Preston County, West Virginia, several miles east of Bruceton Mills, less than two miles (3.2 km) west of the Maryland border.

The Federal Correctional Complex (FCC) Hazelton has three prisons, physically adjacent but distinct: USP Hazelton and the medium-security Federal Correctional Institution, Hazelton constructed in 2015. In addition, there is the Secure Female Facility for women. All are operated by the FBOP.

== Facility ==
USP Hazelton was built due to an increasing need for modern facilities to house the growing number of federal inmates. The high security facility and the satellite minimum security prison camp cost $129 million to build and takes up 996 acres (4.03 km^{2}; 1.56 sq mi). The prison was designed by KZF Architectural Firm.

The 650,000-square-foot (60,000 m^{2}) high-security facility, completed in 2004, contains six two-story buildings with 768 general housing cells and 120 "special housing cells" where especially dangerous prisoners are housed. In addition, there are several one- and two-story buildings which house various prison programs, as well as a factory where prisoners work. It is surrounded by a triple security fence with a taut wire system, and six guard towers around the perimeter.

The 27,000-square-foot (2,500 m^{2}) minimum security Federal Prison Camp, also completed in 2004, is located outside the high security perimeter of the high-security facility. It consists of living units and prison program facilities and has a capacity of 128 inmates.

== Notable incidents ==
On October 7, 2007, inmate Jesse Harris was murdered at USP Hazelton. A long and complex investigation led to an October 2, 2012 indictment charging inmates Patrick Andrews (12550-007) and Kevin Bellinger (03532-007) with second-degree murder. Since both inmates were already serving life sentences — Andrews for a pair of homicides in 1997 and 2000 and Bellinger for attempted murder in 2007 — they were also charged with murder by a federal prisoner serving a life sentence. William J. Ihlenfeld, II, the US Attorney for the Northern District of West Virginia, announced that the Department of Justice will seek the death penalty against Andrews if he is convicted. Andrews is currently incarcerated at USP Florence; Bellinger is at ADX Florence.

On December 6, 2009, inmate Jimmy Lee Wilson was killed during a fight involving at least five other inmates. Five other inmates who were injured during the fight, which was reportedly racially motivated, were transported to a local hospital with non-life-threatening injuries. The facility was placed on lockdown and remained on lockdown for over a month after the incident until prison officials were reasonably certain that there were no further threats to the safety of staff and inmates. Wilson, 25, was serving an 11-year sentence for an armed robbery in Maine. Wilson's killing remains under investigation.

In January 2012, USP Hazelton inmate Gerrod Thompson pleaded guilty to escape. Thompson, who was serving a 120-month sentence at the minimum-security prison camp, admitted that he commandeered a Bureau of Prisons truck on February 12, 2011, and drove it out of the camp to visit his wife. Thompson was apprehended later that day. He was sentenced to three additional months of incarceration.

On October 30, 2018, notorious mob leader and long-time fugitive Whitey Bulger was found beaten with a sock-wrapped padlock and stabbed to death with a shiv in the facility after arriving there the previous day. Bulger had been transferred from the Federal Transfer Center in Oklahoma City to Hazelton on October 29, 2018. At 8:20 a.m. on October 30, not long after his cell was unlocked so he could go to breakfast, the 89-year-old Bulger was found unresponsive in the prison. According to The Boston Globe, and later confirmed by prison authorities, Bulger and had been beaten to death by multiple inmates armed with a sock-wrapped padlock and a prison-made knife. His eyes had nearly been gouged out and his tongue almost cut out. This was the third homicide at the prison in a 40-day span. Correctional officers had warned Congress just days before the most recent Hazelton killing that facilities were being dangerously understaffed. Massachusetts-based mafia hitman Fotios "Freddy" Geas is the primary suspect in orchestrating the killing of Bulger and he has not disputed his role. Geas, 51, and his brother were sentenced to life in prison in 2011 for their roles in several violent crimes, including the 2003 killing of Adolfo "Big Al" Bruno, a Genovese crime family boss who was gunned down in a Springfield, Massachusetts, parking lot.

== Notable inmates (current and former) ==
=== Minimum-Security Camp ===
Inmate Name	Register Number	Photo	Status	Details
Richie Farmer	16226-032		Released from custody in 2015; served a 27-month sentence.	Former Kentucky Agriculture Commissioner from 2004 to 2012 and standout basketball player for the University of Kentucky; pleaded guilty in 2013 to corruption charges for using state funds for personal expenses.

=== High-Security Facility ===
Inmate Name	Register Number	Photo	Status	Details
Whitey Bulger	02182-748		Murdered in custody on October 30, 2018.	Notorious long-time fugitive, crime figure and leader of Boston's Winter Hill Gang; Murdered by other prisoners within hours of his arrival.
Vernon Lance Thomas	09890-424		Sentenced to life imprisonment without the possibility of parole in 1993. Currently incarcerated.	Accomplice of a series of murders in Richmond, Virginia in 1992. One of Thomas's accomplices, Corey Johnson, was executed in 2021 while another two sentenced to death for the murders had their sentences commuted to life without parole by President Joe Biden.
Frank "Cadillac Frank" Salemme	24914-013		Died on December 13, 2022, while serving a life sentence.	Boston mobster who became a hitman and eventually the boss of the Patriarca crime family from 1991 - 1996.
Fotios "Freddy" Geas	05244-748		Serving a life sentence. Now at USP Florence ADMAX.	Massachusetts mobster and hitman. Suspect in Bulger death.
Paul DeCologero	23952-038		Serving a 25-year sentence; scheduled release December 14, 2026. Now at USP McCreary.	Patriarca crime family associate, allegedly involved in the beating and murder of James “Whitey” Bulger.
James Alex Fields Jr.	22239-084		Serving a life sentence. Now at USP Allenwood.	White supremacist, pleaded guilty in 2019 of 29 federal hate crime charges using his car to harm counter-protestors during the Unite the Right rally in Charlottesville, Virginia, killing 32 year-old Heather Heyer and injuring up to 19 more.
Juan García Ábrego	09935-000		Serving 11 life sentences.	Mexican former drug lord who is reported to be the former head of a criminal dynasty along the Mexico–United States border now called the Gulf Cartel.
Aljermiah Mack	86943-054		Serving a 17-year sentence, scheduled for release in 2033. Now at USP Coleman I.	Leader of the Nine Trey Gangsters and affiliate of rapper 6ix9ine, convicted of racketeering due to involvement in the gang's activities during the Trial of the Nine Trey Gangsters.
Nidal Ayyad	16917-050		Serving a 240-year sentence, which has since been reduced several times; scheduled for release in 2067. Now at USP Coleman.	Convicted and sentenced to life imprisonment for his role in the 1993 World Trade center bombing.
James Timothy "Tim" Norman	22122-043		Serving a life sentence.	Star of reality TV show Welcome to Sweetie Pies. He arranged the murder of his nephew Andre Montgomery in contract killing plot in order to obtain $450,000 from life insurance policy.
Eljvir Duka	61282-066		Serving a life sentence.	One of the men who conspired to attack and kill military personnel at a base located in Fort Dix, New Jersey. He was sentenced to life imprisonment alongside his brothers, Shain and Dritan and two other individuals in 2008.
James Rosemond	17903-054		Serving a life sentence plus 30 years. Transferred to USP Pollock.	Former music representative, charged in 2012 with Drug trafficking, obstruction of justice and possessing and using firearms, conspiracy to commit murder. He was at first sentenced to life plus 20 years in 2015 but had his conviction overturned the following year. In 2017 he stood trial for a third time and was sentenced to life plus 30 years.
Zachary Adam Chesser	76715-083		Serving a 25-year sentence; scheduled for release on January 1, 2032. Now at FCI McDowell.	Convicted in 2010 for attempting to provide material support to a designated foreign terrorist organization by aiding Al-Shabaab, a militant group with ties to Al-Qaeda. He was also convicted for sending threats (via Revolution Muslim website) to Trey Parker and Matt Stone, creators of South Park, after they aired an episode of the show with depictions of Muhammad.
Alfredo Beltrán Leyva	58525-007		Serving a life sentence plus 50 years. Now at ADX Florence.	Former leader of the Beltran-Leyva Cartel that operated out of Sinaloa, Mexico. Between the 1990s and 2000s, Beltran Leyva was responsible for the wholesale shipment of cocaine and methamphetamine between the United States, Mexico, and South America. On November 15, 2014, Beltran Leyva was extradited to the United States to face trial for shipping at least 27.9 tons of narcotics into the US. On February 23, 2016, Beltran Leyva pled guilty to charges of international narcotics trafficking and in 2017 was sentenced to life imprisonment plus 50 years.
Patrick Andrews	12550-007		Serving a life sentence at USP Beaumont.	Criminal who murdered two people (in 1997 and 2000) and later killed a fellow inmate at Hazelton in 2007. Received another sentence of life imprisonment in 2015 and was transferred to USP Florence High.
James T. Murphy	99478-555		Serving a life sentence. He is now at USP Terre Haute.	A former Army Sergeant, was stationed in Germany. On August 20, 1987 before leaving Germany, appellant went to his wife's (Petra Murphy, a German national) apartment. There, according to his confession, he killed her by smashing in her head with a hammer. He also admitted that he killed Tim and James, Jr., the two children. He was convicted and sentenced to death for three specifications of premeditated murder, and single specifications of larceny, bigamy, and false swearing. Transferred to USP Florence High after sentence commuted from death row.
Juan Orlando Hernandez	91441-054		Pardoned by President Donald Trump on December 1, 2025, less than two years into his 45-year sentence.	Juan Orlando Hernández, former president of Honduras, was involved in a large-scale drug trafficking and money laundering scheme. U.S. prosecutors linked him to a conspiracy leveraging drug trafficking to maintain political power, with allegations that $1.5 million in drug proceeds helped fund his 2013 election. His brother, Tony Hernández, was sentenced to life in prison for drug-related crimes. Hernández accepted bribes from traffickers, including the Sinaloa Cartel, and provided them with protection using law enforcement and military intelligence. He was extradited to the U.S. in 2022, found guilty of drug trafficking and weapons conspiracy in 2024, and sentenced to 45 years in prison.

== See also ==
- List of U.S. federal prisons
- Federal Bureau of Prisons
- Incarceration in the United States
