= Genovese crime family Springfield faction =

Faction of the Genovese crime family

History of Genovese crime family (Springfield, MA)
- Founded: 1920s
- Founder: Genovese crime family
- Founding location: Springfield, Massachusetts, United States
- Years active: 1920s–present
- Territory: Springfield
- Ethnicity: Italians as "made men" and other ethnicities as associates
- Activities: Racketeering, conspiracy, loansharking, money laundering, murder, gambling, and extortion
- Allies: Patriarca crime family

The Springfield faction of the Genovese crime family is a group of Italian-American mobsters who control organized crime activities in the Springfield, Massachusetts area. The Springfield faction is led by a caporegime who oversees illegal activities in racketeering, illegal gambling, loansharking and extortion.

Springfield, Massachusetts has been a Genovese territory since the family's earliest days, with the most influential Genovese leaders being Salvatore "Big Nose Sam" Curfari, Francesco "Frankie Skyball" Scibelli, Adolfo "Big Al" Bruno, and Anthony Arillotta.

In 2010, the FBI convinced Arillotta and Felix L. Tranghese to become government witnesses as part of the federal government's prosecution of capo Arthur "Artie" Nigro and his associates for the murder of Adolfo "Big Al" Bruno. Arillotta and Tranghese represent only the fourth and fifth Genovese made men to have cooperated with law enforcement.

== Early history ==
=== 1920s ===
During the early 1920s, bootlegging in the Springfield area was initially led by Carlo Siniscalchi. His relationship with what would later be named the Genovese family in New York is unclear. Siniscalchi was murdered on December 20, 1921, after which Antonio Miranda, an ally of the Genovese family, assumed command of bootlegging in the area. Miranda maintained control over organized crime in Springfield and its environs until his death in 1930.

=== 1930s to 1940s ===
After Miranda's death, Salvatore "Big Nose Sam" Cufari headed the Springfield faction. Cufari held sway over several underworld operations in parts of Eastern Connecticut and worked hand-in-glove with fellow Calabrian racketeer Francesco Iaconi, who was the reigning Genovese caporegime in the nearby City of Worcester, Massachusetts.

A local criminal, Francesco "Skyball" Scibelli, would become Cufari's most trusted associate and right-hand man. Cufari's other proteges included Adolfo Bruno, Felix Tranghese, who was Scibelli's cousin, and Scibelli's brothers, Albert "Baba" and Anthony Scibelli.

=== 1950s to 1980s ===
Curfari maintained control of the Springfield faction until his death at the age of 82 on September 17, 1983. Francesco Scibelli then replaced Curfari as caporegime. Notable events in this era include:

- 1961: Francesco Scibelli was convicted and served nineteen months in jail for running a bookmaking operation out of Providence Hospital in Holyoke, Massachusetts.
- 1972: Victor DeCaro, son-in-law of Francesco Scibelli disappeared after being last seen at a bar he owned in Agawam, Massachusetts. DeCaro's body was later discovered in the Connecticut River in Windsor, Connecticut, wrapped in a tarpaulin.
- 1984 Adolfo Bruno, Amedeo Santaniello and several other individuals were arrested for operating a multi-state gambling ring. In 1987, Bruno was sentenced to five years in prison.

=== 1990s to 2000s ===
In 1990, Bruno was at the center of a controversy that many believe cut short the career of longtime Hampden County District Attorney Matthew Ryan Jr. when a top aide accused the DA of being soft on mobsters like Bruno. Ryan, a frequent racquetball partner of Bruno's, denied the allegations but retired that year.

In 1991, Bruno was charged with attempted murder in a gang-related shooting in Agawam, Massachusetts, but later acquitted in 1994. Prosecutors claimed that Bruno and co-defendant John J. "Jake" Nettis shot convicted bookmaker Joseph Maruca in a barn owned by Bruno's brother Frank. State prosecutors used reformed Philadelphia crime family hitman Phil Leonetti as a government witness. Nettis was convicted and received a nine- to ten-year state prison sentence.

In 1993, Vito Ricciardi, a Springfield barber, shot at Bruno twice, but missing, outside the Society of Our Lady of Mount Carmel Club in Springfield over an unpaid debt.

In 1996, Bruno and Francesco J. "Skyball" Scibelli were sentenced to 15 months in prison for illegal gambling. Also charged was son Anthony Bruno. The hit man was sentenced to 10 years for attempted murder, racketeering, money laundering, and intimidating a witness.

On November 23, 2003, after having dinner with his family Adolfo Bruno drove to the Society of Our Lady of Mount Carmel Club to play the Italian card game briscola. After leaving the club, he was shot five times and killed in the parking lot. After the murder of Bruno, Anthony "Bingy" Arillotta took over the Springfield faction.

In 2004, Frankie Roche, a fringe player in Springfield rackets, was arrested in Tampa, Florida as the suspected shooter. Roche pled guilty in 2008 and was sentenced to nearly 14 years in prison.

== Current history (2010s to present) ==
On February 17, 2010, Manhattan federal court announced a 13-count indictment charging Arthur Nigro and Anthony Arillotta of the Genovese crime family with various racketeering crimes, including the murder of Bruno. On July 23, 2010, Felix Tranghese and Ty Geas were arrested in Springfield; in their capacities associated with the Genovese family, Nigro, Tranghese, Emilio Fusco, Fotios Geas, and Ty Geas conspired to murder and aided and abetted in the murder of Bruno, to maintain and increase their position in the Genovese family, as well as to prevent Bruno from providing information to law enforcement about crimes committed by members and associates of the Genovese family.

On May 16, 2011, it was announced that Fusco had been extradited from Italy to the United States, arriving in New York three days prior. Nigro had given the order to murder Bruno; Fusco and others had conspired to carry out the murder. Roche, imprisoned for the murder and hoping that his testimony would speed his release, testified that he had killed Bruno for a promised payment of $10,000. On September 12, 2011, Nigro and Genovese family associates Fotios Geas and Ty Geas, who planned the murder, were each sentenced to life in prison for several crimes in Manhattan federal court. Anthony Arillotta became a government witness and testified against these people.

After Arillotta, the Springfield rackets would be "given" to Eugene "Rooster" Onofrio who was sentenced to 30 months in prison in 2018 leaving faction member Albert "The Animal" Calvanese to take over.

On October 29, 2018, infamous Boston gangster Whitey Bulger was transferred from the Federal Transfer Center in Oklahoma City to United States Penitentiary, Hazelton, in West Virginia. At 8:20 a.m. on October 30, the 89-year-old Bulger was found unresponsive in the prison. Bulger was in a wheelchair and had been beaten to death by multiple inmates armed with a sock-wrapped padlock and a shiv. His eyes had nearly been gouged out and his tongue almost cut off. This was the third homicide at the prison in a 40-day span.

Correctional officers had warned Congress just days before the most recent Hazelton death that facilities were being dangerously understaffed. Fotios Geas was the primary suspect in orchestrating the killing of Bulger. In August 2022, he, along with Paul DeCologero and Sean McKinnon, were indicted on first degree murder charges. In September 2023, Geas was transferred to ADX Florence. The trial was scheduled for December 2024. In May 2024, the trio made an undisclosed plea deal with the U.S. attorney's office in the Northern District of West Virginia.

In April 2024, Ralph Santaniello and his father Amedeo Santaniello seized power leading a mutiny to reclaim the crew back from Albert "The Animal" Calvanese at the Society of Our Lady of Mount Carmel Social Club by force. Calvanese had filed a police protection order to keep the Santaniellos from stepping foot on the property.

Santaniellos' men changed the locks and evicted the Calvanese camp from the Our Lady of Mt. Carmel club in Springfield's South End. Gerry Daniele, a member of the faction, called a meeting of the club's roster of due payers and called a vote to allow a changeover of club administration and the Santaniellos to be let back in as members; the Santaniellos were unanimously voted back into the club's ranks.

In late 2025, Eugene "Rooster" Onofrio was promoted to captain operating in Connecticut and overseeing the Springfield, Massachusetts faction. Onofrio continued to rely on Ralph Santaniello and Amedeo Santaniello to run the daily operations in Springfield. In 2024, longtime West Springfield mobster Frank "Frankie Pugs" Pugliano helped the Genovese family end territory tension after Gambino mobster, recently-made soldier Carmine "Carm the Barber" Manzi, also based in Springfield, began expanding rackets into the Hartford area of Connecticut.

== Historical leadership ==
=== Caporegimes ===
- 1920–1921: Carlo Siniscalchi – murdered on December 20, 1921
- 1921–1930: Antonio Miranda – died in 1930
- 1930–1983: Salvatore "Big Nose Sam" Cufari – died September 17, 1983
- 1983–1998: Francesco "Skyball" Scibelli – retired in 1998, died in 2000
- 1998–2003: Adolfo "Big Al" Bruno – murdered on November 23, 2003
- 2003–2009: Anthony "Bingy" Arillotta – turned government informant
- 2009–2018: Eugene "Rooster" Onofrio – imprisoned
- 2018–2024: unofficial – members reported to the Bronx leaders
  - de facto 2018–2024: Albert "The Animal" Calvanese – deposed
  - Acting 2024–2025: Ralph Santaniello
- 2025–present: Eugene "Rooster" Onofrio

== Current members ==
Soldiers

- Ralph Santaniello (Shelved)
- Emilio Fusco (release date 2031)
- Mario Fiore (semi-retired)
- Frank Pugliano (semi-retired)

== Former members ==
- Felix Tranghese
- Anthony "Bates" DeLevo
- Anthony Torino
- Gaetano Milano
- Nicholas "Nicky" Camerota
- Anthony Volpe
- Alvaro Lanzetta
- Andrew Pradella

== Associates ==
=== Current ===
- Gerald Daniele
- Giovanni "Johnny Cal" Calabrese
- Richard Valentini
- Frank "Shark" Depergola
- Freddy Geas (ADMAX Florence Life)
- Ty Geas (USP McCreary Life)
- Amedeo Santaniello
- Louis "Shoe" Santos
- Christian "Chris" DeMarco (Patriarca)
- Talal "Big T" Soffan
- Antonio Fusco
- Franco Fusco

==== Manzi / Gambino Faction ====
- Carmine "Nuccio" Manzi (Gambino Soldier)
- Giuseppe "Joe Villa" Manzi (Gambino Associate)
- Giuseppe "Joe Polozzo" Manzi (Gambino Associate)
- Antonio Capua (Manzi Affiliate)
- Salvatore "Sal" Fusco (Manzi Affiliate)
- Alfonso Lalli (Manzi Affiliate)
- Claudio Cardapoli (Manzi Affiliate)
- Frank "Fat Frankie" D'Agostino (Manzi Affiliate)
- Louis Saccamando (Manzi Affiliate)
- Nicholas "Nick" Palazzi (Manzi Affiliate)

=== Inactive or deposed ===
- Albert "The Animal" Calvanese
- David "Chicky" Cecchetelli
- Damien "The Omen" Trites
- Brian Hoyle
- Rex Cunningham
- Franco DeCaro
- Michael "Mike T" Tancrati
- Anthony Grasso
- Antonio Esposito
- Brandon "Derek" Croteau
- Yassir Bakr
- Peter “Pete” Siciliano
- Ryan Fattini
- John Rodier
- Reno "Remo" Ceravolo
- Pasquale Perrotta
- James Litterio
- Vincent "Vinnie" Canavan
- Enrico Manzi
- Anthony Basile
- Joseph Gilberti
- Michael "Mikey" DeCaro

=== Deceased ===
- Michael Tangrati
- Joseph "Jay-Jay" Ceravolo
- Louis Pugliano
- Robert "Bobby" DeMarco Sr.
- Andrew Scibelli
- John Bologna
- Antonio "Tony" Facente
- John "Jake" Nettis
- Gary Westerman
- Francesco "Frank" Campiti II
- Victor DeCaro
- Donald "Donnie" Pepe
- John Pradella
- Phillip Bargalla
- Ricardo "Soggy" Songini
- William Fiore
- Anthony Liquori
- Paul Pizzuto
- Louis Maloni
- Henry Siciliano
- James Fiore
- Pasquale Romeo
- Louis Naioleari
- Frank Lombardo
- Amato Santaniello
- Angelo Santaniello
- Louis Scibelli
- Felix Siciliano
- Anthony Camerota
- John DeLevo
- Michael Raffaele
- Jeremiah "Jerry" Maloni
- Paul "Penman" Cardaropoli
- Eugene Graziano
