= Patrick Franklin Andrews =

American serial killer (born 1980)

Patrick Andrews
- Born: Patrick Franklin Andrews c. 1980
- Status: Incarcerated
- Convictions: List: District of Columbia; First degree murder while armed (2 counts); Possession of a firearm during a crime of violence (2 counts); Carrying a pistol without a license (3 counts); Carrying a pistol without a license (3 counts); Possession of an unregistered firearm; Possession of ammunition for an unregistered firearm Federal; Murder by a federal prisoner serving a life sentence
- Penalty: District of Columbia; 35 years to life in prison Federal; Life imprisonment

Details
- Victims: 3
- Span of crimes: 1997–2007
- Country: United States
- States: Washington, D.C. and West Virginia
- Imprisoned at: USP Beaumont

Patrick Franklin Andrews (born c. 1980) is an American criminal and serial killer who murdered three people between 1997 and 2007.

== 1997 and 2000 murders ==
On August 4, 1997, Andrews shot and killed 18-year-old Robert Ward, whom he had a "beef" with, in Washington, D.C. On July 2, 2000, he and another man, Randall C. Mack, shot and killed a man named Deyon Rivers. The shooting happened the day after an altercation between Rivers and David Braddy, a friend of Andrews and Mack. Braddy told them that Rivers had shot firecrackers and that one of them had almost hit his girlfriend. Braddy was angry, but his girlfriend told him to let it go and the incident initially ended without violence. On May 15, 2002, Andrews and Mack were both found guilty of first degree murder while armed, possession of a firearm during the commission of a crime of violence, and two counts each of three weapons offenses: carrying a pistol without a license, possession of an unregistered firearm, and possession of ammunition for an unregistered firearm. On June 12, 2002, Andrews was found guilty of another count of first degree murder, possession of a firearm during a crime of violence, and carrying a pistol without a license in the killing of Ward. He was ultimately sentenced to a total of 35 years to life in prison.

== 2007 USP Hazelton murder ==
On October 7, 2007, Andrews killed fellow inmate Jesse Harris at USP Hazelton in Hazelton, West Virginia, with the help of inmate Kevin Bellinger. 28-year-old Harris was stabbed 20 times at 6:30 p.m. with a shank by Andrews after being ambushed by the duo while returning to their cells. According to statements in the court, Andrews, Bellinger, and Harris had known each other while living in Washington, D.C., prior to their imprisonment.

Andrews and Bellinger were indicted on October 2, 2012, facing charges of second degree murder and murder by a federal prisoner serving a life sentence. On October 8, 2014, Bellinger was sentenced to life imprisonment. On April 13, 2015, Andrews pleaded guilty to murder by a federal prisoner serving a life sentence to avoid a possible death sentence and was sentenced to life in prison without parole.

Andrews was incarcerated at USP Florence High in Fremont County, Colorado (Register No. 12550-007). He was later transferred to United States Penitentiary, Beaumont.

== See also ==
- List of serial killers in the United States
