= Prison violence =

Violence inflicted onto either another inmate, a prison guard, or self-inflicted

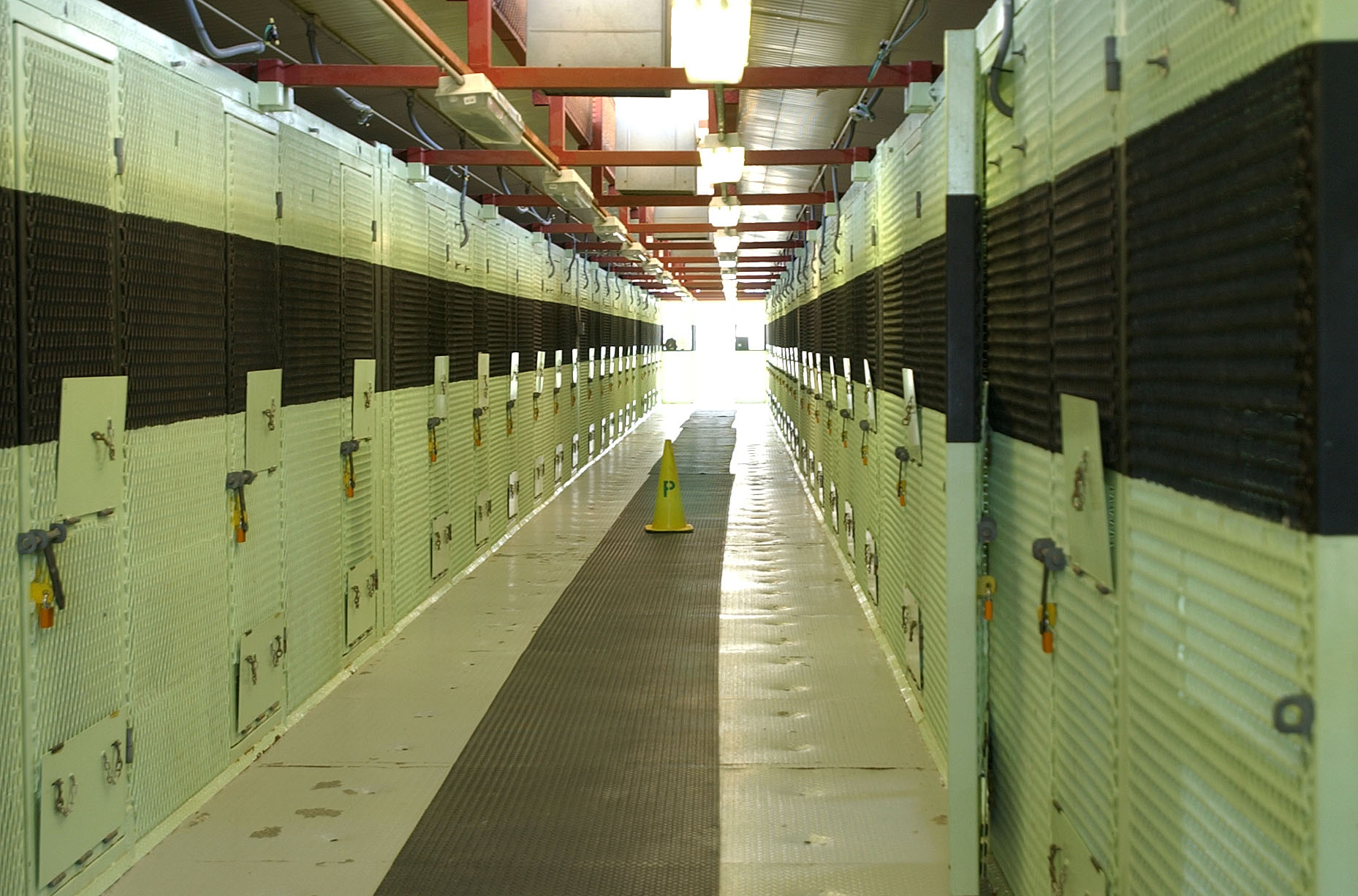
A typical prison cell block in Guantanamo Bay detention center, Camp Delta, Cuba.

Prison violence refers to physical assaults, sexual abuse, riots, and other forms of aggressive behavior that occur within correctional facilities. It represents a significant challenge for prison administrators, affects the safety and rehabilitation of incarcerated individuals, and raises broader questions about the conditions of confinement.

Violence in correctional settings occurs worldwide, and in several forms.

Prisons try to avoid and deal with such situations by being proactive. Steps that are taken include placing violent convicts and gang leaders into solitary confinement, balancing the cells by critically examining each inmate to see where they are likely to reside peacefully, reducing blind spots, and conducting officer training and education. However, prison violence is often overlooked and ignored, which can lead to severe injuries and fatalities.

== Acts of violence ==
Prison violence encompasses multiple forms of harm that occur within correctional facilities, including inmate-on-inmate, inmate-on-staff, staff-on-inmate, and self-directed violence. Research indicates that violence rates in prisons are far greater than in the general population, though accurate measurement is challenging because of underreporting.

=== Inmate-on-inmate violence ===
Physical assaults between incarcerated individuals represents the most commonly observed or reported form of prison violence. Incidents range from spontaneous altercations to premeditated attacks, and from individual to gang-related conflicts and large-scale riots. In 1999, it was reported that one in five inmates, or twenty percent of inmates, at fourteen U.S. state prisons had been physically assaulted by another inmate. Gang activity contributes substantially to inmate-on-inmate violence in many correctional systems. Rival gang affiliations, competition for control of prison economies (including drug trafficking), and requirements to maintain reputation or "respect" within the institutional hierarchy drive many violent incidents. Weapons used in these attacks are frequently improvised from available materials, known as "shanks" or other makeshift implements.

=== Inmate-on-staff violence ===
Correctional officers, medical personnel and other prison employees face risk of assault in their work environment. Factors contributing to inmate-on-staff violence include inadequate staffing levels, provocative staff behaviour, and the inherent tensions of the custodial relationship. The psychological and physical toll on correctional staff can be substantial, contributing to high rates of job-related stress, burnout, and turnover in the corrections profession.

=== Staff-on-inmate violence ===
Less frequently documented but equally concerning is staff-on-inmate violence, which may involve excessive use of force or abuse of authority. Independent oversight mechanisms, body-worn cameras, and improved accountability have been proposed and implemented in some jurisdictions to address this form of violence.

=== Sexual violence ===
Sexual violence, including rape and coercion, affects both male and female prisoners and often goes unreported due to stigma and fear of retaliation.

=== Instrumental and expressive violence ===
Broadly, there are different motivations and patterns of violence.

- Instrumental violence is premeditated; it is planned out, calculated, and implemented to achieve specific goals such as establishing dominance, maintaining reputation, enforcing debts, or controlling territory and resources. This form of violence is often rationalized within prison subcultures as necessary for survival and respect.
- Expressive violence occurs more spontaneously, driven by immediate emotional states such as anger, fear, frustration, or perceived threats. It is the non-rational release of tension. This reactive aggression may result from interpersonal conflicts, perceived disrespect or the accumulated stress of confinement.

=== Self-directed violence ===
Self-directed violence, including both non-suicidal self-injury and suicide attempts, represents a significant concern within correctional facilities and occurs at elevated rates compared to the non-incarcerated population. Many incarcerated individuals enter facilities with pre-existing mental health conditions such as depression and anxiety that are made worse by the stress of confinement. Inadequate mental health screening, limited access to treatment, isolation practices, witnessing or experiencing interpersonal violence, substance withdrawal and hopelessness about sentences or life circumstances all contribute to the prevalence of self-directed violence. While it is distinct from interpersonal violence, self-directed violence is often interconnected with the broader violence ecosystem: exposure to sexual victimization and threat of harm can lead to self-injurious behaviours and suicidal ideation.

== Causes of violence ==
Prison violence results from an interplay of individual, institutional, and environmental factors. Understanding these causes is essential for developing effective prevention strategies.

=== Overcrowding ===
Overcrowding is a significant problem many prisons face because handling a large number of volatile inmates at once can lead to many altercations. Other factors, such as a shortage of guards and inmates possessing weapons, can create further opportunities for violent incidents to occur. Trying to assert authority and strict rules on these violent offenders is extremely difficult due to the fact that these people do not respond well to restrictions and being told what to do. Having to focus on so many dangerous people at once is just not possible because there will always be someone not being watched over at any given moment; this is most likely when inmates choose to strike. Overcrowding is a very common issue in American prisons that leads to prison violence because the prisons will be understaffed.

=== Staffing levels ===
Prison violence and prison suicide in England and Wales have been increasing year on year while staffing levels have been falling. Reduction in the number of staff is blamed for this and the Ministry of Justice has admitted that staff cuts are a factor. It was felt urgent action was needed. The government has provided money for increased staff, but staffing levels are set to remain below 2010 levels.

Mark Day of the Prison Reform Trust spoke of a “hidden emergency unfolding in our prison system” and said increasing prison violence should not become the new normal the lives of people living and working in prisons depended on that. Frances Crook, of the Howard League for Penal Reform, said:

Cutting staff and prison budgets while allowing the number of people behind bars to grow unchecked has created a toxic mix of violence, death and human misery … Today’s figures show that we cannot wait for legislation – bold and radical action is needed now to stop the death toll rising further.

=== Indirect supervision ===
Indirect supervision is when a correctional officer is placed in an enclosed booth and must constantly watch over the inmates through a bird’s eye view. The physical interactions that officers have with the inmates is minimal, for most of the communication comes through an intercom system. Inmates are placed in their own cells and officers have physical barriers to ensure their own safety. When havoc is wreaked, a call for a response team is placed over the intercom. This type of supervision is strong, but has some drawbacks, such as the creation of blind spots. These are created through indirect supervision because the guards standing watch can have objects blocking tiny spots or they may just not be looking in the right direction at the right time. Indirect supervision is an impersonal and more distant form of supervision that helps with officer safety, but leaves blind spots for “…inmates to conceal illicit activity from security staff”.

=== Direct supervision ===
Direct supervision is a more personal type of design because officers are assigned a cell block to patrol. Through this layout, the guards actually speak to cellmates one-on-one. The minor altercations that take place throughout the day is directly handled by the patrol officer, but this single officer cannot prevent a violent attack from happening. As soon as their back is turned or their attention is focused on someone else, the perpetrator can still commit violence. In this form of supervision officers are left more vulnerable, but it also leads to, “…decreased tension and stress of staff and inmates…”. Direct supervision is more of a hands-on form of management, where “…major incidents are not as numerous and minor incidents result in higher numbers…”.

== Weapons used ==
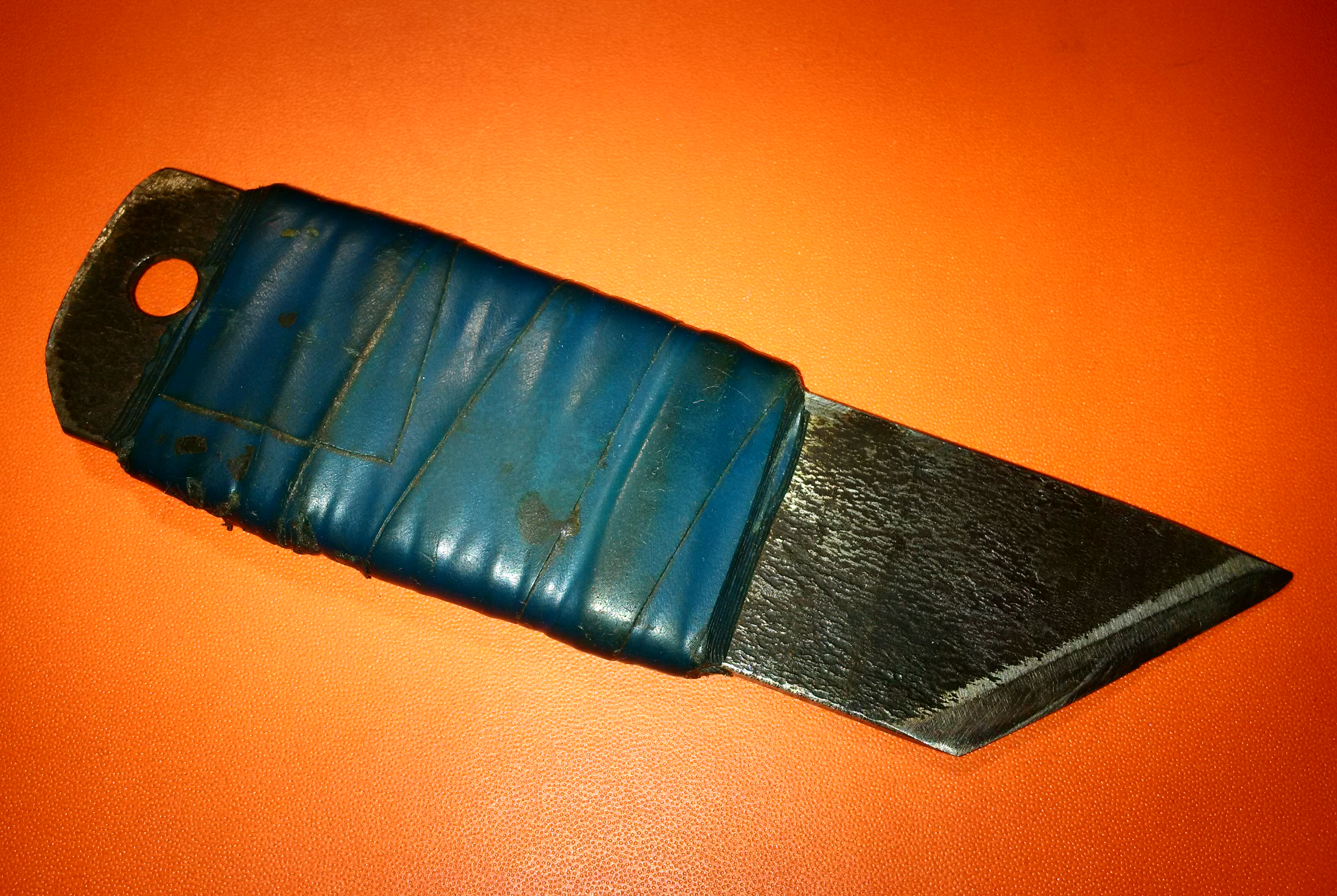
An improvised weapon (or "shiv") from a Soviet prison

Most inmates look to get into an altercation armed with some sort of homemade weapon. The weapons they use to attack their victims are made to be very destructive and can easily be both hidden and accessed. They use objects such as shanks, clubs, daggers, razors, and saps to serve as weapons. A shank is a homemade knife, and is used to stab the person they are planning on fighting with, typically created by sharpening a common object. Clubs are considered “…objects such as pitchers, hot pots, and broom handles…”. They are put into use by throwing or hitting their target with these objects. A sap is typically a padlock enclosed in a sock, but really any hard object can be placed inside. Their prey is hit, typically over the head, with this weapon. Razor blades are very commonly used to commit prison violence. When an inmate knows there is a possibly of facing an attack, they will often place razors inside their mouths (in their cheeks) so that they can spit the razor out of their mouth and slash up the other person’s face. Since this tactic has been caught onto, many times a person will first punch whomever they are fighting in the face so that if a razor is in there, their mouth will get cut.

== Weapon creation ==
The prison store, supplies provided by prisons, and objects visitors bring are typically where the weapon creation process begins. Inmates getting a hold of items, “…such as disposable razors and toothbrushes” manipulate and transform these materials into a weapon of destruction. They may sharpen it or harden it using other items. In other instances, “Items that appear innocuous have been converted into weapons”. Inmates also use everyday items in their natural form in dangerous ways that is clearly not used as they were originally intended. Often, when an inmate uses this form to create their weapons, it is used on officers because the items do not look questionable so it is easy to catch the corrections officer off guard. Some will, “…fashion the metal post of a bunk bed or the edge of a cell door into a spear…that could be flung from inside a cell and penetrate a man’s neck or liver”, which is called the bone crusher. Some inmates will go to great lengths to create weapons and many different ways to create these weapons has been discovered.

== Security threat groups ==
Officers call prison gangs STGs, or security threat groups. These groups are highly dangerous and take part in a huge majority of attacks that occur in prisons. Originally, "The early formation of STGs was based on racial/ethnic ideologies and protection from other groups. Later they developed the intent to commit acts of violence and form crime syndicates." These gangs' sole purpose is to have control and dominance, which is gained through violent attacks. Often, these attacks are committed onto rivals and people issued in the Bad News List. The Bad News List can be presumed as a factor for prison violence. This list is circulated among a gang and once a name is found on this list, it is inevitable that they will be attacked. A person is typically place on the Bad News List if they, "…stole from an affiliate on the outside, or because you failed to repay a drug debt, or because you're suspected of ratting someone out."

The people on the list will be attacked on sight, but once their debts are paid, they are immediately removed from the Bad News List. Most, if not all, gang prison violence is instrumental and is very intricately planned out. Gang members will often send out or receive encoded, in depth letters on violent attacks that are ordered to take place, other times, "…gang members used the drainage pipes of their in-cell toilets to communicate clandestinely across cell-blocks…". It has become clear that, "Extensive communication systems coordinated between inmates, criminal activity, and street gangs are common", and a vast majority of the prison violence that occurs begins with these communication systems. Security threat groups are at the heart of many of the altercations that take place within prison walls, and they commit these acts simply because they are ordered to do so.

== Violence against prison guards ==
Inmates often feel animosity and a sense of hatred towards prison guards due to the treatment they receive and the power the guards have over them. In 1999, more than 2,400 correctional officers required medical attention after being assaulted by an inmate, and according to a 2002-2003 study, most guards were assaulted through the use of clubs. Along with these clubs, inmates tend to use weapons of opportunity when attacking an officer. A weapon of opportunity is any typical, everyday object that is not considered a weapon until used in a destructive way. The reason for this hostility, and ultimately inmate attacks on guards can be placed onto the way the incarcerated are treated.

Inmates are often humiliated and have extreme force placed upon them. There are no excuses that can be made in an officer’s offense to defend these actions, unless their life was put into jeopardy. Implementing these uncalled for actions reasonably cause animosity between the inmates and guards. There are cases where if an inmate disobeys an order, “…groups of officers…approach his cell, dressed in protective gear and armed with shield, Tasers, and other weapons. If the inmate refuses to comply, the officers will flood his cell with chemical agents…they have reportedly thrown stinger grenades, which spray rubber pellets into a concentrated area…and violently subdue him”. Correctional and Detention personnel use force as a last resort, in the above scenario; entry into an inmate's cell would need to be necessary before force could be justified. For example, if an inmate has a court hearing and has barricaded himself in his cell, refusing to come out or comply with the officials orders, force might be used. Another instance would be if the inmate needed to be transferred to another facility and refuses to comply with the directives to move.

== Violence prevention measures ==
Preventing all prison violence is an impossible task because it is impossible to be prepared for any and every situation. Nevertheless, prisons are taking measures to avoid, or at least limit, this violence. They are doing things such as balancing the cells, reducing blind spots, and training officers. When prisons receive new inmates, they search the background of the individual; they look into things like any possible gang affiliation and any history of racism or anger issues. After piecing this information together, the officers will place them in a cell block that they feel is most appropriate and that will cause the least arousal between the new inmate and the ones already housed there. Reducing the blind spots is a difficult task to complete because it is impossible to watch every inch of the prison at once, but by watching over as much as possible at a time does reduce the chances of violence occurring. Training officers is the third measure being taken. If officers treat the inmates properly and not be rash and assert violence on them so quickly, the inmates may feel more respected and not look to retaliate. Also with the training, officers are learning how to deal with minor altercations more effectively, as in without force and violence unless necessary. Also, the correction officers are learning about the psychology of the inmates. These officers are becoming aware of the psychological differences and hardships the incarcerated tend to face and how to properly deal with them. If all of these precautionary measures are taken, then prison violence rates can definitely lower, although completely vanishing is something not likely.

=== Supermax facilities ===
A supermax is a separate facility within a prison where inmates are placed: “…for violent/predatory behavior within other institutions. They may be identified as gang leaders, or considered high risk for escape. Inmates incarcerated in the supermax facility do not have the freedoms allowed inmates in general population because of their security status/institutional disciplinary record”. These inmates are placed in a cell for twenty three hours a day and have more limitation than the typical convict possess. This prevention measure works because it takes the biggest threats and influences, such as gang members, out of the picture. An issue that arises with this is that: “…some prisoners subjected to isolation become so damaged that they pose a renewed threat to staff and inmates when they return to the general prison population”. This means that the already dangerous and threatening inmates can return to the regular prison population with a new, stronger desire to retaliate and cause prison violence. The supermax facility serves as a good method to eradicate the influence of the most dangerous of inmates, but risks the return of a vengeful inmate.

== See also ==
- Prison riot
- Prison reform
- LGBT people in prison
- Prison gangs in the United States
- Prison rape in the United States
- Prison violence in Brazil
