= United States Penitentiary, Beaumont =

High security prison in Texas, United States

Coordinates: 29°57′52″N 94°04′46″W

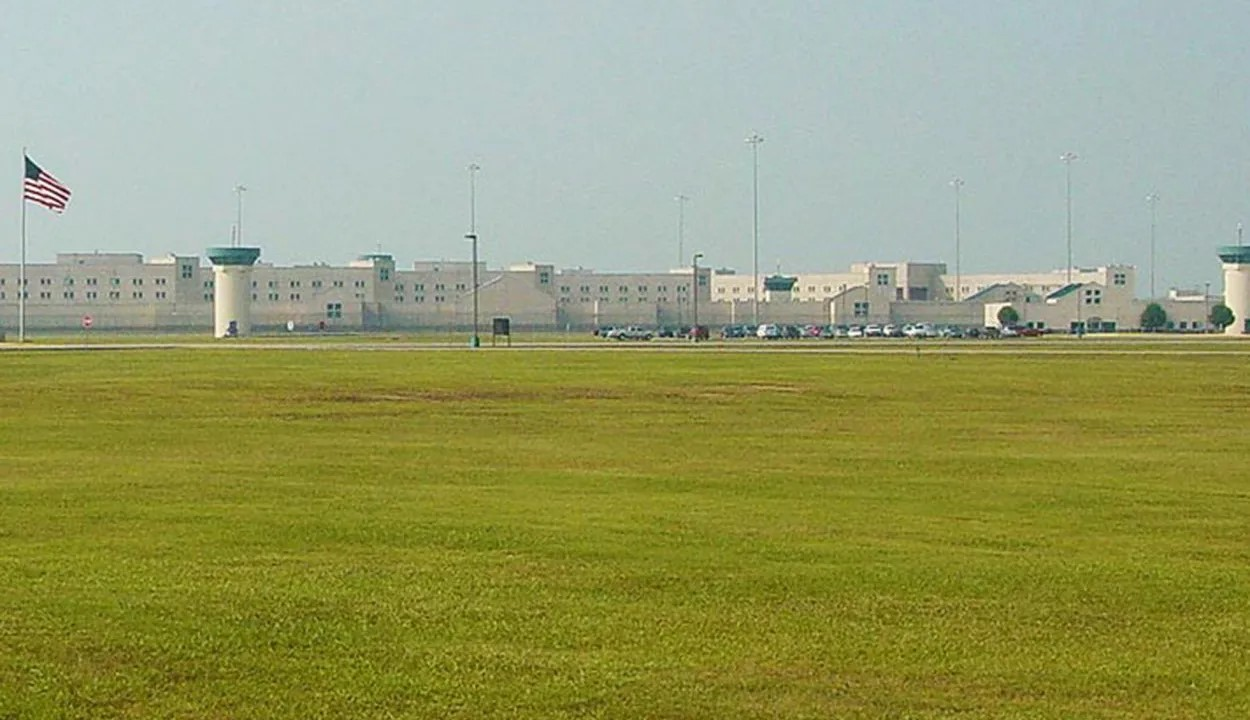
- Interactive map of United States Penitentiary, Beaumont
- Location: Jefferson County, near Beaumont, Texas
- Status: Operational
- Security class: High-security
- Population: 1,157 (September 2023)
- Opened: 1998
- Managed by: Federal Bureau of Prisons
- Warden: Charles Daniels

The United States Penitentiary, Beaumont (USP Beaumont) is a high security United States federal prison for male inmates in unincorporated Jefferson County, Texas. It is part of the Federal Correctional Complex, Beaumont (FCC Beaumont) and is operated by the Federal Bureau of Prisons, a division of the United States Department of Justice.

FCC Beaumont is located approximately 100 miles (160 km) east of Houston.

== Incidents ==
=== 1998 inmate murder ===
On September 10, 1998, inmate Ellis Joseph Mosher stabbed fellow inmate Stanley Moseley to death in a housing unit. Mosher stabbed Moseley multiple times with a 13-inch improvised blade in full view of correctional officers on duty. Mosher was serving a 20-year sentence for kidnapping, while Moseley was serving a 15-year sentence for bank robbery. Mosher's defense claimed that Moseley had attacked him and raped him on previous occasions. Mosher's attorneys stated that he faced an imminent threat being housed with Moseley and had no alternative but to attack him. Mosher was sentenced to life in prison in 2008, he is currently housed at ADX Florence.

=== 1999 inmate murder ===
On December 16, 1999, inmates Arzell Gulley and David Lee Jackson began arguing with another inmate, Darryl Brown. The argument resulted in Gulley and Jackson chasing Brown into a housing unit with "shanks", until they cornered him in a cell. The duo then stabbed Brown a total of 11 times, killing him. An autopsy found that a single knife strike hit Brown's left lung, resulting in his death. Gulley and Jackson were both indicted for the murder of Brown in 2005. Gulley was sentenced to life in prison and Jackson was sentenced to death. Jackson's death sentence was overturned and he was re-sentenced to life imprisonment after it was determined that the government withheld evidence in his trial. Gulley is currently serving his sentence at USP Hazelton, while Jackson is at FCI Yazoo City.

=== 2001 inmate murder ===
On January 5, 2001, inmate Luther Plant was beaten and stomped to death by inmate Shannon Wayne Agofsky in an exercise cage. Plant was serving a 15-year sentence for drug offences while Agofsky was serving a life sentence for armed robbery of a bank, and the subsequent kidnapping and murder of the bank president in Noel, Missouri. The autopsy revealed that Plant suffered numerous injuries including a crushed neck, abrasions on his head, a broken jaw and nose, hemorrhaging around both eyes, four broken teeth, and internal bleeding in the lungs, trachea, esophagus, and stomach. Agofsky was transferred to ADX Florence before being convicted and sentenced to death for Plant's murder in 2004. He was on death row at USP Terre Haute until December 2024, when President Joe Biden commuted Agofsky's death sentence (and those of 36 other inmates on federal death row) to life in prison. Agofsky subsequently attempted to refuse the commutation as it would likely interfere with his ongoing appeal. In September 2025, Agofsky was transferred back to ADX Florence.

=== 2005 inmate murder ===
On May 7, 2005, inmates Marwin Mosley and Joseph Ebron entered the cell of inmate Keith Barnes where Ebron held Barnes down as Mosley stabbed him 106 times, killing him. Barnes was incarcerated for murder and conspiracy to rob, however, he became a target for Mosley and Ebron due to his testimony against a co-defendant for a reduced sentence. Mosley committed suicide in prison in 2006, and Ebron was charged with first-degree murder in the case and sentenced to death in 2009. Additionally, Michael Bacote, the inmate who acted as the lookout during the homicide was charged with second-degree murder and sentenced to 28 years in prison. Ebron was housed on death row at USP Terre Haute but had his sentenced commuted to life imprisonment by President Joe Biden, while Bacote is serving his sentence at USP Allenwood. Ebron was transferred to ADX Florence following his commutation.

=== 2007 inmate murder ===
On November 28, 2007, correction officers were escorting inmates Mark Snarr (11093-081) and Edgar Garcia (28132-177) to their cells at the USP Beaumont. When they arrived, Snarr and Garcia slipped from their restraints, repeatedly stabbed both correction officers with homemade prison knives known as shanks, and took the officers' cell keys.

Snarr and Garcia then unlocked the cell of inmate Gabriel Rhone (09304-007) and stabbed Rhone over 50 times. Additional officers arrived and used chemical agents to stop the attack, which lasted several minutes and was captured on surveillance camera. The wounded corrections officers and Rhone were transported to a local hospital, where Rhone was pronounced dead. The officers were treated and survived.

Attorneys for Snarr and Garcia claimed that Rhone had repeatedly threatened to kill their clients and that prison officials had failed to respond to those threats. However, Snarr and Garcia were subsequently convicted of murder and both were sentenced to death on May 24, 2010. They were both held on death row at USP Terre Haute until their death sentences were commuted by President Joe Biden in December 2024. Snarr and Garcia were then transferred to ADX Florence.

=== 2008 inmate murder ===
On February 12, 2008, USP Beaumont staff discovered the body of a 29-year-old inmate, Ronald Joseph, in his cell. An autopsy showed that Joseph died from asphyxia due to ligature strangulation or compression of the neck. Further investigation identified James Sweeney (58827-066) and Harry Lee Napper (32403-037), both inmates at USP Beaumont, as suspects in the murder. Sweeney and Napper were indicted and charged with first-degree murder, conspiracy to commit murder, and second-degree murder on May 4, 2011. In 2012, Sweeney pleaded guilty to racketeering and murder charges for leading the prison gang Dead Man Incorporated in exchange for the murder charge being dismissed and was sentenced to life in prison. Napper received a decades-long sentence. Sweeney is now at USP Terre Haute and Napper is at ADX Florence.

=== 2014 inmate murder ===
On March 3, 2014, inmates Ricky Fackrell and Christopher Cramer stabbed inmate Leo Johns to death. Fackrell, Cramer, and Johns were all members of the white supremacist prison gang Soldiers of Aryan Culture (SAC). Fackrell and Cramer decided they needed to punish Johns for gambling and drinking, activities that are prohibited for SAC members. Defense counsel for Fackrell claimed that the men only agreed to assault Johns, however, both men were convicted of first-degree murder and conspiracy to commit murder and sentenced to death in 2018. Fackrell and Cramer were initially housed at ADX Florence, but transferred to USP Terre Haute after sentencing. Following their commutations by President Joe Biden in 2024, they were transferred back to ADX Florence.

=== 2022 fatal altercation ===
On the morning of Monday, January 31, 2022, multiple MS-13 members began attacking associates of the Mexican Mafia and the Surenos. Although officers responded quickly, four inmates were severely injured and taken to the hospital. Of them, 34-year-old Andrew Pineda and 54-year-old Guillermo Riojas would later be pronounced dead. In the aftermath of the deadly fight, the United States Bureau of Prisons enacted a lockdown across the entire Federal Prison network. On April 7, 2022, 7 members of MS-13 were charged with racketeering conspiracy, murder in aid of racketeering, and other offences related to the brawl. The indictment named Juan Carlos Rivas-Moreiera, Dimas Alfaro-Granados, Rual Landaverde-Giron, Larry Navarete, Jorge Parada, Hector Ramires, and Sergio Sibrian as defendants.

== Notable inmates ==
- Joel Cacace - consigliere of the Colombo crime family, pleaded guilty to racketeering, extortion, illegal gambling, and participating in four murders in 2004; released on May 22, 2020, after serving 17 years of a 20-year sentence
- Willis Mark Haynes - serving a life sentence plus 45 years for shooting and killing three women on the Patuxent Research Refuge in Prince George's County, Maryland. His accomplice, Dustin Higgs, received a death sentence for his involvement in the crime, and was executed on January 16, 2021.
- Oscar Ramiro Ortega-Hernandez - serving a 25-year sentence for perpetrating the 2011 White House shooting, an attempt to kill President Barack Obama; pleaded guilty to terrorism and weapons offenses for using a semi-automatic rifle; scheduled for release on June 21, 2033; transferred to FCI Herlong
- Richard Scrushy - Founder of HealthSouth Corporation who was convicted of bribery, conspiracy, and mail fraud.
- Stephen Ernest Stockman - former United States Representative for Texas's 36th congressional district sentenced for money laundering, mail and wire fraud, and falsification of records; served 2 years of a 10-year sentence, received a presidential pardon from Donald Trump on December 22, 2020
- Oscar Wyatt - founder of the Coastal Corporation in Texas; pleaded guilty in 2007 to wire fraud for paying kickbacks to Saddam Hussein's regime to win oil contracts from Iraq; part of the United Nations Oil-for-Food Program debacle; released from custody on November 14, 2008; served 1 year at the minimum-security prison camp
- Orlando Garcia - Found guilty of facilitation of first-degree murder in the murder of Tennessee State Trooper Calvin Jenks in January 2007 and sentenced to 19 years.
- Patrick Franklin Andrews - Serial killer who murdered fellow prisoner while serving 35-year-to-life sentence for two murders committed in Washington, D.C.

== See also ==
- List of U.S. federal prisons
- Federal Bureau of Prisons
- Incarceration in the United States
