= Fotios Geas =

American mobster

Freddy Geas
- Born: Fotios Geas; April 4, 1967 (age 59); Springfield, Massachusetts, U.S.
- Other name: Freddy Geas
- Status: Incarcerated at ADX Florence
- Convictions: Murder in aid of racketeering (2 counts); Voluntary manslaughter Assault resulting in serious bodily injury
- Penalty: Life imprisonment (2011)

Fotios "Freddy" Geas (Greek: Φώτιος Γκέας; b. April 4, 1967) is an American mobster and an associate of the Springfield faction of the New York City-based Genovese crime family.

Geas is accused of having orchestrated the 2018 murder of Winter Hill Gang boss Whitey Bulger in prison, and was charged in relation to the incident in August 2022. His trial was scheduled to begin in December 2024, but in May 2024, he made an undisclosed plea deal with the U.S. attorney's office in the Northern District of West Virginia.

== Criminal career ==
Geas was born into a Greek family; therefore, he could not be a made member of the Italian-American Mafia. Geas and his brother Ty were well known enforcers feared within their community. The Geas brothers worked with Anthony Arillotta, another mobster. In 2003, Arillotta was formally inducted into the Genovese crime family Springfield faction. Arillotta had requested that the Geas brothers kill his brother-in-law, Gary Westerman. Acting boss Arthur Nigro organized a hit on aging gangster Adolfo Bruno. Both hits were carried out in 2003.

In 2011, Geas was charged with the murders of Gary Westerman and Adolfo Bruno. He was also indicted as the getaway driver in the failed assassination attempt of Bronx union boss Frank Dadabo, after Dadabo was involved in an argument with Nigro over Tony Bennett concert tickets.

During the 2011 trial, Geas was shocked to see his former associate Arillotta testify against him. Geas was known for his strict code, despising snitches and men who abused women. Geas refused to cooperate with law enforcement and was sentenced to life in prison.

=== Murder of Whitey Bulger ===
On October 29, 2018, infamous Boston gangster Whitey Bulger was transferred from the Federal Transfer Center in Oklahoma City to United States Penitentiary, Hazelton, in West Virginia. At 8:20 a.m. on October 30, the 89-year-old Bulger was found unresponsive in the prison. Bulger was in a wheelchair and had been beaten to death by multiple inmates armed with a sock-wrapped padlock and a shiv. His eyes had nearly been gouged out and his tongue almost cut off. This was the third homicide at the prison in a 40-day span.

Correctional officers had warned Congress just days before the most recent Hazelton death that facilities were being dangerously understaffed. Geas was the primary suspect in orchestrating the killing of Bulger. In August 2022, he, along with Paul DeCologero and Sean McKinnon, were indicted on first degree murder charges. In September 2023, Geas was transferred to ADX Florence. The trial was scheduled for December 2024. In May 2024, the trio made an undisclosed plea deal with the U.S. attorney's office in the Northern District of West Virginia. In June 2024, prosecutors dropped the charge that McKinnon was involved in the slaying, and he pled guilty to lying to the FBI about whether he knew the other two men; he was sentenced to 22 months time served and was released. In August 2024, prosecutors dropped two charges against DeCologero, first-degree murder and conspiracy to commit murder, in exchange for a guilty plea of assault resulting in serious bodily injury. The judge sentenced DeCologero to 51 months. Geas had his plea agreement unsealed at his sentencing on September 6, 2024, where he received a 25-year sentence for voluntary manslaughter and assault resulting in bodily injury.
