= Zachary Adam Chesser =

American man who aided Al-Shabaab, a terrorist organization

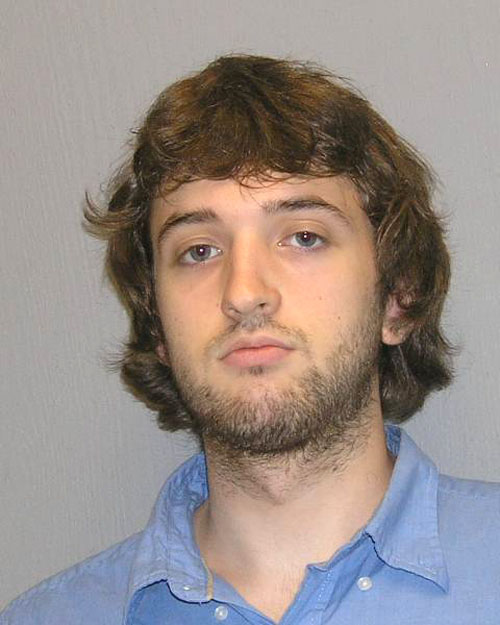
- 2010 mugshot of Chesser
- Born: December 22, 1989 (age 36); Charlottesville, Virginia, U.S.
- Other name: Abu Talhah al-Amrikee
- Occupations: Unemployed (student); propagandist, blogger for militant Islamist movement
- Spouse: Proscovia Nzabanita
- Children: 1
- Status: Incarcerated at Federal Correctional Institution, McDowell
- Motive: Terrorism
- Convictions: Providing material support to al-Shabaab, a terrorist organization
- Penalty: Imprisonment of 25 years

Zachary Adam Chesser (born December 22, 1989) is an American convicted in 2010 for aiding al-Shabaab, a Somalia-based terrorist group aligned with al-Qaeda, which has been designated a terrorist organization by the U.S. government. On February 24, 2011, after pleading guilty, Chesser was sentenced in federal court to 25 years in prison. He is also known for his threats to South Park creators Trey Parker and Matt Stone for their depictions of Muhammad in an episode of that series.

== Early life and education ==
Chesser was born on December 22, 1989, in Charlottesville, Virginia, to Barbara Katenbrink Chesser, a lawyer and prosecutor, and David Chesser. His parents divorced, and Chesser moved to Fairfax County, Virginia by the time he was in middle school.

He was attending Kilmer Middle School in Vienna, Virginia, where he was selected for the gifted and talented program. He then attended Oakton High School, where he participated on the school's football, basketball and crew teams. In eleventh grade, he began break-dancing with a group of Korean American students. He graduated in 2008. His yearbook profile said, "As the only Caucasian member of the break-dancing club, senior Chesser was not intimidated by being the only non-Asian."

After high school, in 2008, Chesser enrolled at George Mason University in Fairfax County, Virginia, and dropped out after one semester. He worked briefly as a caretaker at the Islamic Center of Northern Virginia in Fairfax, Virginia.

== Pursuit of Islamic activism ==
Chesser told Federal Bureau of Investigation agents that he became interested in Islam in July 2008. High school friends said his interest seemed to start when he began dating a Muslim girl. Sources disagree about whether he converted.

Chesser used online media to disseminate his views, catching the attention of Jarret Brachman, a terrorism scholar, who engaged Chesser in email correspondence. In his 2008 book on terrorism, Brachman coined the term "jihobbyist" for people such as Chesser, who are fascinated by Islam or jihad but were not members of recognized terrorist organizations.

By 2010, Chesser had created a YouTube account called LearnTeachFightDie, and a website called the mujhidblog.com. He corresponded by e-mail with Anwar al-Awlaki, a radical American Muslim cleric who was then in hiding in Yemen who U.S. officials allege has encouraged homegrown terrorism. Al-Awlaki was later targeted and killed in a drone strike because of his role in al-Qaeda attacks against the United States.

In 2009, both friends and members of the Islamic Center of Northern Virginia noticed that Chesser's views were becoming more extreme; he had conservative ideas about dress customs. An older member at the Islamic Center said he tried to broaden Chesser's views of the Islamic scriptures, but that Chesser took too narrow a view of them.

In April 2010, Chesser wrote an e-mail to Fox News, saying that he sought to "raise awareness of the correct understanding of key Islamic beliefs". He said "If you kill us, then we kill you", and he quoted al-Qaeda leader Osama bin Laden, saying that Muslims had the freedom to act against attacks on the Prophet. He further wrote in the e-mail:

I seek to help the world understand that neither the Muslims in general nor the mujahideen including Al Qaeda are abject to peace, but that this peace come with the following conditions: a complete withdrawal of non-Muslim forces from Muslim lands, an ending of the propping up of the apartheid regime of Israel, and a ceasing of the propping up of the brutal dictators we currently have who refuse to rule by divine law. ... I also seek to help the world understand that there will be no peace until the above conditions are met. Basically the formula works like this … if you kill us, then we kill you. If you do not kill us then we can have peace. 9/11 had nothing to with freedom or democracy. It had to do with the murder of hundreds of thousands of Muslims around the world by American and other powers. ... As Usama bin Laden said with regard to the cartoons of Denmark, if there is no check in the freedom of your words, then let your hearts be open to the freedom of our actions.

Chesser became one of the most visible members helping Jesse Curtis Morton, also known as Younes Abdullah Mohammed, who ran the radical Revolution Muslim website. Morton said he created the site to promote propaganda supporting al-Qaeda. Revolution Muslim was one of the few American websites to praise the Fort Hood Shooting in 2009, in which a U.S. Army psychiatrist killed fellow U.S. Army soldiers.

In April 2010, Revolution Muslim's website posted a statement jointly drafted by Chesser under the online username Abu Talhah al-Amrikee and Morton that warned South Park creators Trey Parker and Matt Stone of violent retribution for their depictions of Muhammad. The post included the business addresses of likely targets of retribution, including Comedy Central, which airs the comedy show, and Parker and Stone's production company.

Chesser threatened the South Park creators on a variety of other online platforms, including his blog and Twitter pages. Chesser wrote, "We have to warn Matt and Trey that what they are doing is stupid and they will probably wind up like Theo van Gogh if they do air this show", a reference to the 2004 murder of Theo van Gogh, a Dutch filmmaker, by a Muslim extremist.

== Legal proceedings ==
On July 10, 2010, Chesser was arrested with his infant son in Uganda while boarding a flight to Somalia. He told federal agents that he intended to go to Somalia, home of al-Shabaab, a terrorist organization. An affidavit filed in federal court alleges that he intended to join al-Shabaab as a "foreign fighter." He was charged with aiding al-Shabaab, which is aligned with al-Qaeda and has been designated a terrorist organization by the U.S. government. After pleading guilty, Chesser was sentenced in federal court on February 24, 2011, to 25 years in prison.

On October 20, 2010, Chesser pleaded guilty to three felonies: communicating threats to Parker and Stone, soliciting violent jihadists to "desensitize" law enforcement, and attempting to provide material support to a designated foreign terrorist organization. "Desensitizing" law enforcement referred to plans to place suspicious-looking but inoffensive packages in public places, until police became lax about dealing with them, at which point a real explosive could be used. These three charges carried a maximum of 30 years in prison; Chesser's sentence was 25 years. Morton also pleaded guilty to terrorist-related charges.

In February 2012, the U.S. Senate Homeland Security and Governmental Affairs Committee released a report on Chesser, Zachary Chesser: A Case Study in Online Islamist Radicalization and Its Meaning for the Threat of Homegrown Terrorism. The report traced Chesser's upbringing in Virginia, his lack of direction, his attraction to minority beliefs and attention-seeking, and his rapid transformation into a convicted terrorist. The report was based on Chesser's writings, including 37 pages of written correspondence between Chesser and Committee staff, from August to October 2011, after he had been imprisoned.

In June 2014, Chesser was transferred from the United States Penitentiary, Marion in Marion, Illinois, to the ADX Florence supermax security prison in Florence, Colorado due to repeated rules infractions. He was then transferred from ADX and to United States Penitentiary, Florence High in Fremont County, Colorado for a short period. From 2019 to 2025, he was incarcerated at United States Penitentiary, Hazelton in Preston County, West Virginia. He was then transferred to Federal Correctional Institution, McDowell in Welch, West Virginia, where he is currently incarcerated.

== Personal life ==
In 2009, he married Proscovia Nzabanita, a Muslim woman from Uganda, and they had a son named Talhah, born in November 2009. (Nzabanita's mother Cecilia is not Muslim.) Since Chesser's incarceration, his mother Barbara and Barbara's life partner Stacy Anderson, also a lawyer, have had custody of his son against Chesser and Nzabanita's wishes. His wife Nzabanita was deported from the United States.
