= Federal Correctional Institution, Texarkana =

Low-security prison in Texas, US

Coordinates: 33°22′41″N 94°05′13″W

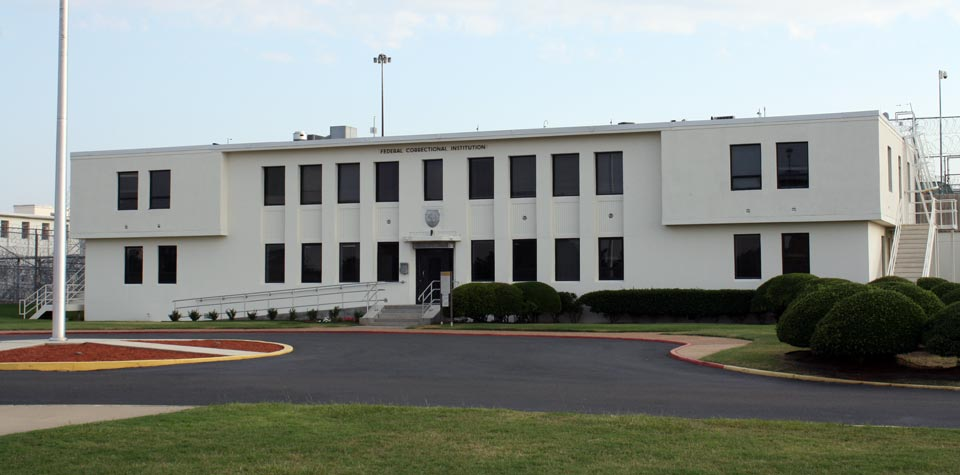
- Interactive map of Federal Correctional Institution, Texarkana
- Location: Bowie County, near Texarkana, Texas
- Status: Operational
- Security class: Low-security (with minimum-security prison camp)
- Population: 1,200 (290 in prison camp)
- Managed by: Federal Bureau of Prisons

The Federal Correctional Institution, Texarkana (FCI Texarkana), is a low-security United States federal prison operated by the Federal Bureau of Prisons, a division of the United States Department of Justice. The facility also has an adjacent satellite prison camp for minimum-security male offenders.

FCI Texarkana is located in northeast Texas near the Arkansas border, 70 miles north of Shreveport, Louisiana, and 175 miles east of Dallas, Texas.

== Notable incidents ==
In early 2012, Keith Judd, a FCI Texarkana inmate serving a 17-year sentence for extortion, filed papers to run for president in the 2012 general election, and attained ballot status in the West Virginia Democratic primary. On May 8, 2012, Judd won 41% of the primary vote in West Virginia against incumbent Barack Obama, a higher percentage of the vote in one state than any other primary opponent of Obama had hitherto achieved in 2012 (a figure later surpassed by John Wolfe Jr.'s showing in the Arkansas primary). While this showing would normally have entitled Judd to delegates at the 2012 Democratic National Convention, state officials expressed some uncertainty as to whether Judd had completed the required formalities, such as filing a slate of delegates and completing paperwork. Judd, who has not qualified for any other primary ballots, contested the ballot count, alleging that ballot workers suppressed the actual total (which he said showed him in the lead) in an effort to cover up an Obama loss.

== Notable inmates (current and former) ==
†Inmates who were released from custody prior to 1982 are not listed on the Bureau of Prisons website.

Name	BOP Number	Photo	Status	Details
Jimmy Snowden	Unlisted†		Transferred to Federal Correctional Institution, Lompoc in 1971 and released in 1972.	Member of the White Knights of the Ku Klux Klan who became a conspirator and participant in the murders of Chaney, Goodman, and Schwerner in 1964.
Carlos Marcello				Boss of the New Orleans crime family. Imprisoned after being caught in an FBI sting operation involving insurance bribery.
Billy Cannon	01727-095		Released in 1992.	Heisman Trophy winner in 1959 and American Football League player from 1960 to 1970; pleaded guilty to counterfeiting in 1983 for printing $50 million worth of phony $100 bills.
Ricky Donnell Ross	05550-045		He was sentenced to life in prison, though the sentence was shortened on appeal and Ross was released in 2009.	Also known as "Freeway Ricky"; an American author and convicted drug trafficker best known for the drug empire he established in Los Angeles, California, in the early to mid 1980s.
Dan Morales	28928-180		Released from custody in 2007; served 40 months.	Texas Attorney General from 1991 to 1999; pleaded guilty in 2003 to mail fraud and tax evasion for mishandling legal fees from the state's lawsuit against the tobacco industry.
Terry Loewen	24134-031		Serving a 20-year sentence, scheduled for release in 2030.	Convicted in the 2013 Wichita bombing attempt.
Ray Nagin	32751-034		Served 6 years of a 10-year sentence; released early in 2020 due to the COVID-19 pandemic.	Mayor of New Orleans from 2002 to 2010; convicted in 2014 of conspiracy to commit bribery, money laundering and honest services wire fraud for awarding contracts to business in exchange for kickbacks in the form of checks, cash, personal services and free travel. The story was also featured on the CNBC television program American Greed.
Eric Kay	04401-509		Serving a 22-year sentence; scheduled for release in 2041. Currently at FCI Englewood.	Former communications director for the Los Angeles Angels of Major League Baseball; convicted of distributing fentanyl resulting in the death of Angels pitcher Tyler Skaggs on July 1, 2019.

== See also ==
- List of U.S. federal prisons
- Federal Bureau of Prisons
- Incarceration in the United States
