= Federal Correctional Institution, McDowell =

Medium-security prison in West Virginia, US

Coordinates: 37°28′12″N 81°33′11″W

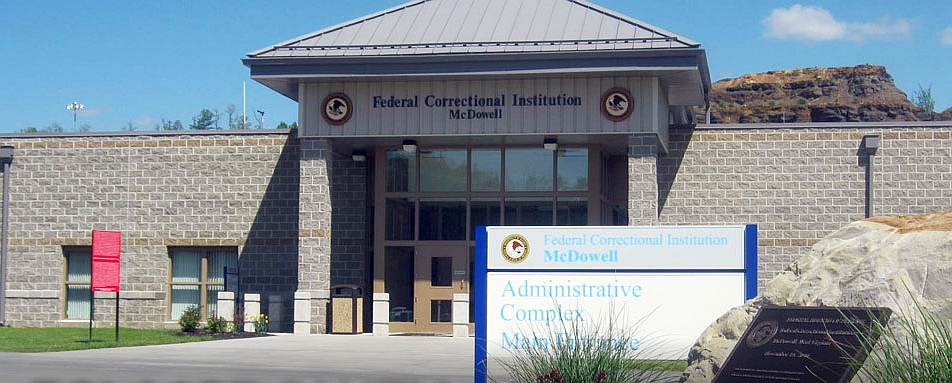
- Interactive map of Federal Correctional Institution, McDowell
- Location: McDowell County near Welch, West Virginia
- Status: Operational
- Security class: Medium-security (with minimum-security prison camp)
- Population: 1,660 (130 in prison camp)
- Opened: 2010
- Managed by: Federal Bureau of Prisons

The Federal Correctional Institution, McDowell (FCI McDowell) is a medium-security federal prison for male offenders in southwestern West Virginia. It also has an adjacent satellite prison camp which houses minimum-security male offenders. It is operated by the Federal Bureau of Prisons, a division of the United States Department of Justice. The complex lies in a detached rural area about four miles north of the city of Welch.

== History ==
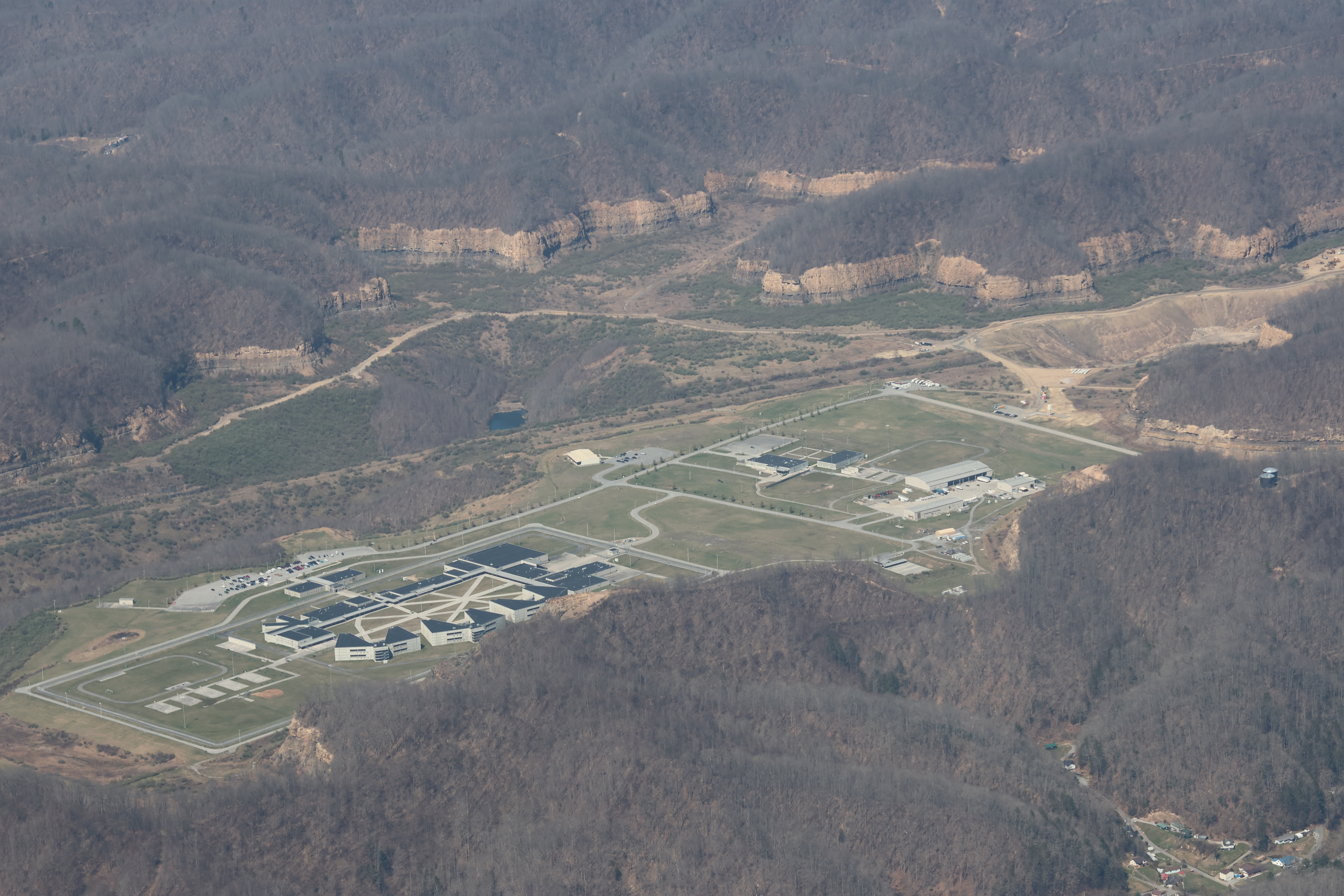
Aerial photo of Federal Correctional Institution, McDowell

In the early 2000s, the Bureau of Prisons identified McDowell County, West Virginia, as a potential location for a new federal correctional facility. A panel of BOP officials held a hearing in 2004 to give residents the opportunity to register their opinions regarding the project. Two hundred residents attended the hearing and were nearly unanimous in their approval, citing the hundreds of jobs the construction project would provide. The project eventually employed approximately 100 contractors, who further boosted the local economy by patronizing local businesses. The facility was completed in 2010 at an approximate cost of $223 million. The first inmates to arrive were assigned to the minimum-security prison camp and were immediately put to work in maintenance jobs. However, in a July 2010 article, West Virginia Public Broadcasting reported that local people were not landing as many prison jobs as expected. Out of the first 87 hires, only 12 were from McDowell County and 5 from bordering Wyoming County.

== Notable inmates (current and former) ==
| Inmate Name | Register Number | Photo | Status | Details |
|---|---|---|---|---|
| Denicio Elrayno Francisco | 31707-308 | | To be released in 2031 | Leader of ESB (East Side Bloods) set in Phoenix, Arizona. |
| Tony F. Mack | 64765-050 | | Released September 7, 2018; served a 58-month sentence. | Mayor of Trenton, New Jersey from 2010 to 2014; convicted in 2014 of bribery, mail fraud, wire fraud and extortion for agreeing to obtain city construction permits and sell city-owned property at below market value in exchange for money. |
| Zachary Adam Chesser | 76715-083 | | Serving a 25-year sentence; scheduled for release on January 1, 2032. | Convicted in 2010 for attempting to provide material support to a designated foreign terrorist organization by aiding Al-Shabaab, a militant group with ties to Al-Qaeda. He was also convicted for sending threats (via Revolution Muslim website) to Trey Parker and Matt Stone, creators of South Park, after they aired an episode of the show with depictions of Muhammad. |

== See also ==
- List of U.S. federal prisons
- Federal Bureau of Prisons
- Incarceration in the United States
