= 2013 Wichita bombing attempt =

Attempted suicide bombing

2013 Wichita bomb plot
- Location: 37.65480°N 97.42789°W; Wichita, Kansas, U.S.
- Date: December 13, 2013 (UTC−5)
- Target: Wichita Mid-Continent Airport
- Attack type: Suicide bombing, Islamic terrorism
- Weapon: Car bomb
- Deaths: 0
- Injuries: 0
- Perpetrator: Terry Lee Loewen
- Motive: Extremist Islamic beliefs

The 2013 Wichita Bomb Attempt was an attempted suicide bombing that targeted the Wichita Mid-Continent Airport on December 13, 2013. The attack was attempted by 58-year old avionics technician Terry Lee Loewen.

== Perpetrator ==
At the time of the attempted attack, Terry Lee Loewen was a 58-year-old avionics technician who was employed by the airport. Loewen’s employment at the airport allowed him to spend months studying the airport layout and flight schedules. His employment also provided him access to areas within the airport. Loewen became radicalized after reading extremist Islamic material on the Internet. Terry L. Lane is a known alias of Loewen’s.

Community and family members were stunned to learn of Loewen's plans, describing him as "A really good guy" and "Always a calm and loving man." After Trick-or-treating at his house 6 weeks prior, a neighbor described him and his wife as "Both normal people." His first wife described him as "Mellow."

== Attack ==
Terry Lee Loewen entered the airport early on the morning of December 13, 2013, with the intention of detonating a car bomb to kill as many people as possible. The perpetrator tried to use his pass to open a security gate leading to the airport tarmac, but was taken into custody at 5:40 am CT after his pass had been disabled following an FBI investigation. Authorities were able to act so quickly because Loewen was the subject of a federal investigation, stemming from his activity on Facebook, which advocated violent jihad. Due to this undercover investigation, the explosives in Loewen’s car were inert and no explosion would have been possible. No deaths or injuries were sustained.

== Motivation ==
Loewen’s primary influences were apparently the now-defunct website known as Revolution Muslim and the late Muslim cleric Anwar al-Awlaki. Revolution Muslim has been associated with a number of U.S.-born extremists. Loewen also claimed he was attempting to support Al-Qaeda in the Arabian Peninsula. Three other American citizens have attempted to join Al-Qaeda in the Arabian Peninsula (AQAP) in 2013.

== Timeline of events ==
August 5 -- In an ongoing dialogue with a person Loewen does not realize is an FBI employee, Loewen expresses his desire to "engage in violent jihad on behalf of al Qaeda."

August 8 -- Asked if he would like to be introduced to someone who can help him engage in jihad, Loewen replies, "Brothers like Osama bin Laden and Anwar al Awlaki are a great inspiration to me, but I must be willing to give up everything (like they did) to truly feel like a obedient slave of Allah."

August 17 -- Loewen writes, "I have read Anwar AI-Awlaki's 44 ways of Jihad and like everything I've ever read of his, it's very informative."

August 21-- Loewen outlines some ideas, writing, "Let me get to the bottom line without being too revealing - I have numerous ideas of ways I could perform jihad in the path of Allah but ... none of them are legal. I'm 58 years old and spending my remaining years behind bars for a good reason is not out of the question for me."

August 26 -- Loewen offers a tour of the airport and writes, "Direct jihad against a civilian target is not out of the question."

August 27 -- Loewen elaborates on his vision, writing, "I guess I look at myself as the 'access' guy at this point just need more details, if any exist at this point - are we talking explosives, because I know nothing about that? It's all very surreal at this point, exciting, yet scary."

September 2 -- Thinking the FBI employee posing as a jihadist is upset because Loewen had allowed a family member to access his computer, Loewen apologizes and writes, "I'm not able to keep things in order, therefore causing an unsafe environment (sic) for myself and others, and the worse thing I can think of is someone else going down for my stupidity. I really don't see me living through any thing I have in mind, assuming I can even pul (sic) it off. Again I apologize for this (expletive) mess, and will miss the wonderful conversations we had. Peace be with you my brother."

September 3 -- Loewen assures the FBI employee no one's identity was compromised and "reasserted his commitment to engage in jihad," according to the complaint.

September 6 -- Discussing his plans, Loewen writes, "I believe the potential for me doing more is staggering. I have some rough ideas, but I know nothing about explosives. Don't you think with my access to the airport that I should put that to good use?"

September 13 -- Loewen writes, "Reading about the actions of the muhajideen (sic) and actually carrying them out is two different things. If not for my family, I would have already carried out some sort of operation - but that's my fault for putting others before Allah which I know better than to do."

September 17 -- After discussing fighter jet trainers he had seen on the airport tarmac, Loewen writes, "I don't see anyway an operation could be planned in advance. It would have been possible today for me to have walked over there, shot both pilots (I don't know if they are armed or not), slapped some C4 on both fuel trucks and set them off before anyone even called TSA".

October 3 --The FBI employee tells Loewen he had just met overseas with individuals connected to al Qaeda in the Arabian Peninsula and asks if he would be willing to scout targets, collect security information, take photos of access points and plant a device. Loewen responds, "Wow! That's some heavy stuff you just laid down. Am I interested? Yes." Loewen goes on to express concern about whether the FBI employee is who he says he is, according to the complaint, and writes, "I hate this government so much for what they have done to our brothers and sisters, that to spent (sic) the rest of my life in prison without having taken a good slice out of the serpents head is unacceptable to me."

October 4 -- Loewen writes that he had some questions: "As I've stated before, I won't be able to access the ramp with a vehicle until next year- so driving on to airport property with a van full of C4 is out of the question- after the first of the year, we could drive a city bus out there."

October 5 -- Asked if he is interested in dying for the cause and offered a chance to back out, Loewen responds, "I can't see myself doing anything that involves killing children, unless I know everything is being done to minimize that. I understand it's a war, and some of these brothers may have had their children killed by this country, but in light of what the Prophet said concering (sic) this, I just need to be sure it can be kept to an absolute minimum."

October 7 -- Loewen sends photos of an airport access badge, entrance gates to the tarmac and devices used to access the gates.

October 8 -- Loewen explains what the badge codes and colors meant.

October 11 -- He further discusses his plans and writes, "Count me in for the duration."

October 18 -- The FBI employee asks Loewen if he wants to meet "one of the brothers in person" and offers to provide him with a new laptop. Loewen responds, "I will only bring a weapon if the brother thinks it to be advisable. The only reason I would see the need for one is if law enforcement were to show their ugly self's (sic), at which point I would start shooting to give the brother time to flee."

October 25 -- Another FBI employee, posing as a Muslim "brother," meets with Loewen, who reiterates his desire to blow up a plane with numerous people on board, according to the complaint. They later decide the attack should be launched near Christmas.

November 11 -- In discussing his October 25 in-person meeting, Loewen writes to the first FBI employee, "I feel so close to this brother(as you said I would) that going to the end with him seems like the right thing to do."

November 19 -- Loewen meets again with the second FBI employee, and he provides his research on the best time to conduct the attack "based upon the number of people who would be boarding aircraft and the number of people who would be in the terminal," the complaint says, adding, "Loewen further expressed his desire to kill as many people as possible." He also provided a diagram of the terminal and tarmac and offered to obtain certain components and wire the explosive device, the complaint says. "They agreed on a final plan, that once Loewen got gate access, they would drive to the terminal in the early morning hours, and detonate the device between the terminals for maximum casualties, and that both FBI Employee 2 and Loewen would die in the explosion," the complaint says.

November 21 -- Loewen meets with the second FBI employee and provides the requested components.

December 3 -- Loewen and the second FBI employee discuss the containers that will be used for the bomb and how to construct it. Loewen then gives the FBI employee a diagram of the terminal with an X designating where to park the bomb, along with flight schedules, according to the complaint.

December 6 -- Loewen renews his badge and is told he had been granted access to the tarmac.

December 9 -- Loewen uses his badge to access the tarmac for one minute, the complaint says.

December 11 -- Loewen meets with the second FBI employee. They go to another location where Loewen wires the "bomb," and they agree the attack will take place December 13. Later that day, Loewen tells the FBI employee he skipped work and wrote letters to his family members.

December 13 -- The second FBI employee picks up Loewen at a hotel, and they drive to the location where the bomb is stored. Loewen finishes wiring the bomb, and the pair head to the airport, arriving at about 5:40 a.m. Loewen twice swipes his badge to open the gate to the tarmac, but it had been disabled. He was then arrested, authorities said.

== Criminal charges ==
Loewen was charged with one count of attempting to use a weapon of mass destruction, one count of attempting to damage property by means of an explosive and one count of attempting to provide material support to a designated foreign terrorist organization. Loewen pleaded guilty on June 8, 2015. On September 1, 2015, he was sentenced to 20 years in Federal Prison. As of October 2026, he is imprisoned at the Federal Correctional Institution in Texarkana. Per the U.S. Bureau of Prisons, his release date is listed as December 28, 2030.
