= Adolfo Bruno =

Italian-American mobster

- Born: November 24, 1945; Bracigliano, Campania, Italy
- Died: November 23, 2003 (aged 57); Springfield, Massachusetts, U.S.
- Cause of death: Gunshot wounds
- Other name: Big Al
- Occupation: Mobster
- Allegiance: Genovese crime family

Adolfo Bruno (Italian pronunciation: [aˈdɔlfo ˈbruːno]; November 24, 1945 – November 23, 2003), also known as "Big Al", was an Italian-born American mobster who was a caporegime with the Genovese crime family based in New York City, who ran the Springfield, Massachusetts faction of the family.

== Criminal career ==
Bruno was born in Bracigliano, Campania, Italy, on November 24, 1945, and immigrated to the United States at the age of 10, settling in Springfield.

In 1984 Bruno was one of several individuals arrested in a multi-state gambling ring along with Amedeo Santaniello. In 1987, Bruno was sentenced to five years in prison. Bruno's codefendants included Mario Fiore, Anthony "Turk" Scibelli, Ricky S. Songini, Felix Tranghese, Albert "Baba" Scibelli, and Donald Pepe.

In 1990, Bruno was at the center of a controversy that many believe cut short the career of longtime Hampden County District Attorney Matthew Ryan Jr. when a top aide accused the DA of being soft on mobsters like Bruno. Ryan, a frequent racquetball partner of Bruno's, denied the allegations but retired that year.

In 1991, Bruno was charged with attempted murder in a gang-related shooting in Agawam, Massachusetts, but later acquitted in 1994. Prosecutors claimed that Bruno and co-defendant John J. "Jake" Nettis shot convicted bookmaker Joseph Maruca in a barn owned by Bruno's brother Frank. State prosecutors used reformed Philadelphia crime family hitman Phil Leonetti as a government witness. Nettis was convicted and received a nine- to ten-year state prison sentence.

In 1993, Vito Ricciardi, a Springfield barber, shot at Bruno twice, but missed, outside the Society of Our Lady of Mount Carmel Club in Springfield over an unpaid debt.

In 1996, Bruno and Francesco J. "Skyball" Scibelli were sentenced to 15 months in prison for illegal gambling.

== Death ==
On November 23, 2003, after having dinner with his family, Bruno drove to the Society of Our Lady of Mount Carmel Club to play the Italian card game briscola. After leaving the club, he was shot five times and killed in the parking lot.

In 2004, Frankie Roche, a fringe player in Springfield rackets, was arrested in Tampa, Florida, as the suspected shooter. Roche pled guilty in 2008 and was sentenced to nearly 14 years in prison. On February 17, 2010, Manhattan federal court announced a 13-count indictment charging Arthur Nigro and Anthony Arillotta of the Genovese crime family with various racketeering crimes, including the murder of Bruno. On July 23, 2010, Felix Tranghese and Ty Geas were arrested in Springfield; in their capacities associated with the Genovese family, Nigro, Tranghese, Emilio Fusco, Fotios Geas, and Ty Geas conspired to murder and aided and abetted in the murder of Bruno, to maintain and increase their position in the Genovese family, as well as to prevent Bruno from providing information to law enforcement about crimes committed by members and associates of the Genovese family. On May 16, 2011, it was announced that Fusco had been extradited from Italy to the United States, arriving in New York three days prior. Nigro had given the order to murder Bruno; Fusco and others had conspired to carry out the murder. Roche, imprisoned for the murder and hoping that his testimony would speed his release, testified that he had killed Bruno for a promised payment of $10,000. On September 12, 2011, Nigro and Genovese family associates Fotios Geas and Ty Geas, who planned the murder, were each sentenced to life in prison for several crimes in Manhattan federal court.
