= Revolution Muslim =

Islamic organization in New York City (2007–2010)

Revolution Muslim (RM) was a Pan-Islamic organization based in New York City that advocated the establishment of a traditionalist Islamic state through the removal of the current rulers in Muslim-majority nations and an end to what they consider "Western imperialism". It was founded in 2007 by two American Muslim men: Jesse Curtis Morton and Yousef al-Khattab.

They operated both on their website "RevolutionMuslim.com" and through street preaching and protests. They frequently protested outside the Islamic Cultural Center of New York, a moderate Muslim mosque. The website was eventually shut down in November 2010, shortly after the arrest of one of the leaders.

By November 2013, Morton, Zachary Adam Chesser, and al-Khattab—the organization's leaders—had all been arrested and convicted in US courts. Morton was released in 2015 and al-Khattab in 2016, while Chesser is scheduled to be released in 2032.

== History ==
The group of 5–10 members was co-founded in 2007 and run by two American converts to Islam, Yousef al-Khattab (born Joseph Cohen) and Jesse Curtis Morton (who used the pen name Younes Abdullah Mohammed), who said their spiritual leader was Abdullah al-Faisal.

Al-Khattab had been born to a secular Jewish family from Atlantic City, New Jersey. He later became an Orthodox Jew and moved to Israel, where he studied at an Orthodox rabbinical school. He and his family converted to Islam and moved to the Palestinian Territories as well as East Jerusalem. He is said to have worked driving a taxi, operating a pedicab, or running a restaurant. He also ran a perfume stall. At that time, he took the Muslim name Yousef al-Khattab. Jesse Curtis Morton, a Columbia University graduate, was a friend of al-Khattab's. As he embraced Islam, he used the pen name Younes Abdullah Mohammed. The group promoted propaganda against the United States, Jews, Israel and others on its website, including moderate Muslims. The website was largely run by member Jesse Curtis Morton, aka Younes Abdullah Mohammed, a New York resident, but other contributors were from outside New York.

In addition to propagandizing via the website and blogs, the group has distributed anti-Israeli literature and regularly protested outside moderate mosques in New York City. The mosques have called the police several times because of RM activities, but its members have not caused violence at the mosques. The website also served as a source for threats against Jews and Jewish organizations, particularly from al-Khattab. Legal and law enforcement officials in the US monitored the group, and described its activities at the time as protected by the First Amendment. The Anti-Defamation League has monitored the group and its members since 2006. A later terrorist influenced by Revolution Muslim was Terry Lee Loewen, who attempted to bomb the Wichita, Kansas airport in December 2013.

In December 2009, al-Khattab expressed support on the website for Nidal Malik Hasan, the US Army psychiatrist accused of the Fort Hood shooting in November of that year. The Department of Defense classified the events as "workplace violence," pending Hasan's court-martial. On December 12, 2009, al-Khattab posted a video on the group's website announcing that he had retired and was moving to Morocco, and that the group would be run by Abdullah as-Sayf Jones. According to a video Jones made, he was born David Scott Jones and grew up in Brevard County, Florida. He converted to Islam at the age of 16, taking the name Abdullah as-Sayf. After following the group online, in 2009, Jones moved to New York in 2009 and joined RM.

In April 2010, Abdullah as-Sayf Jones publicly left the group; he announced having become a practitioner of Shia Islam. He has since spoken out frequently against Revolution Muslim and radical extremism. He has counseled Muslim youths against being attracted to extremist organizations.

In April 2010, Revolution Muslim posted a statement on its blog from Anwar al-Awlaki, a prominent American-Yemeni cleric then in hiding in Yemen. US officials have alleged that he was connected to various terrorists, including the 9/11 hijackers and the Christmas Day 2009 bomber. The Fort Hood shooter had communicated with him when doing research on Muslims in the American military. Alwaki said in that statement, "America cannot and will not win. The tables have turned and there is no rolling back of the worldwide Jihad movement."

On October 30, 2013, al-Khattab pleaded guilty to using his position as a leader of the "Revolution Muslim" websites to use the Internet to place others in fear of serious bodily injury. This related to postings made in January 2009, in which he encouraged visitors to the website to seek out the leaders of Jewish Federation chapters in the U.S. and "deal with them directly at their homes." Al-Khattab gave the names and addresses of synagogues in New York and another Jewish organization in Brooklyn. He also posted maps and directions to various Jewish facilities, and a link to The Anarchist Cookbook. Al-Khattab was sentenced to three years in prison in April 2014.

== Analysis ==
Mia Bloom, a political science professor at the Pennsylvania State University's International Center for the Study of Terrorism, says Revolution Muslim may look like amateurs when compared with other extremist websites, but is still a threat. She has studied the process of its attracting dissidents to the website. "It may lead people who become radicalized by it to turn to other, more dangerous Web sites," such as those run by terrorist organizations, she said, or to terrorist actions. She characterized the RM message as “narrow” and "misinformed" about Islam.

Ibrahim Hooper, a spokesman for the Council on American–Islamic Relations, said regarding the Revolution Muslim group,

"[It is] an extreme fringe group that has absolutely no credibility within the Muslim community, they also cuss you out. In fact, most Muslims suspect they were set up only to make Muslims look bad. We just have very deep suspicions. They say such outrageous, irresponsible things that it almost seems like they're doing it to smear Islam."

=== Influences ===
Law enforcement organizations followed the website to keep track of posters and others attracted to it. Colleen LaRose, also known as "Jihad Jane," said she frequently watched Revolution Muslim videos on their YouTube channel. The scholar Jarret Brachman, a specialist on terrorism and contributor to Foreign Policy magazine, said she was the type of person fascinated by jihad but not belonging to a terrorist organization; he coined the term "jihobbyist" for such people in his 2008 study of global terrorism. He noted such activists may be motivated to take part in violence while not knowing much about the religion. A number of other prominent and lesser known terrorists were also associated with the site, including Samir Khan, Jose Pimentel and Carlos Eduardo Almonte.

In November 2009 CNN published an interview about the organization and a video of Revolution Muslim protest activities from their website, which showed Younes Abdullah Mohammed saying, that U.S. troops were "legitimate targets – until America changes its nature in the international arena." He said that Osama bin Laden was a role model. CNN aired the previously scheduled program the evening after the Fort Hood shootings; no connection has been made between the Revolution Muslim statements and the shooting.

=== Threats ===
Revolution Muslim wrote threats on its website against Matt Stone and Trey Parker, the creators of the TV cartoon series South Park, when a 2010 episode of the show, entitled "200", depicted Muhammad in a way they described as insulting. Zachary Adam Chesser, under his user name of Abu Talhah al-Amrikee, wrote the threat and had been active in posting other inflammatory material on the website. The Revolution Muslim website threatened the two men with violent retaliation and listed the addresses of both Comedy Central's New York office and Stone and Parker's production office in Los Angeles.

The 20-year-old Chesser had a history over nearly two years of publicizing terrorist propaganda under his Muslim pen name on websites and blogs, and promoting violence against non-Muslims. A resident of Fairfax County, Virginia, he may have converted to Islam (The Fairfax Times and the Washington Post have published differing accounts). Friends and acquaintances said that in 2009, he became more extremist, adopting increasingly conservative views and traditional Islamic dress, and promoting them for others.

On July 21, 2010, Chesser was arrested on federal terrorism charges. Earlier that month he had been barred from boarding a flight to Uganda; he intended to fly on to Somalia and join foreign "freedom fighters" with Al-Shabab. After the terrorist group claimed responsibility for bombing a World Cup semi-final in Uganda, Chesser called the FBI and said he wanted to report information on the group. He pleaded guilty to all charges in October 2010 and in February 2011 was sentenced to 25 years in prison.

== Times Square car bomb ==
On May 1, 2010, a failed car bomb attempt was discovered by the New York City Police Department near the eastern corner of 1 Astor Plaza, the headquarters of Comedy Central parent company Viacom. The New York Daily News reported that police were looking into a possible link between the attempted bombing and the threats against Comedy Central. It turned out to be an unrelated event by Faisal Shahzad, a naturalized American citizen with ties to the Pakistani Taliban. Shahzad was arrested, pleaded guilty to ten counts, and was sentenced to life in prison.

Revolution Muslim denied any involvement with the incident. Jesse Curtis Morton, aka Younes Abdullah Mohammed, the co-founder who still ran the group's website at the time, was in Times Square speaking out against President Barack Obama. But he said of the failed car bomb, "What do you think, I commanded somebody to blow up a building in the middle of Times Square? [...] It had nothing to do with the 'South Park' controversy. It was not an attack targeting Viacom."

=== Hacking and closure ===
In June 2010, Revolution Muslim's website was hacked and redirected to an image of Muhammed. The United States shut down the Revolution Muslim website in late 2010 due to its threats of violence made against British MPs; it had posted the addresses of the MPs.

Chesser had been arrested in July 2010 and pleaded guilty to all federal charges, receiving a sentence of 25 years in prison. Mohammed (Morton) was arrested in 2011, convicted and sentenced in 2012 to more than ten years in prison.

== Former members ==
Prior to the closure of its website, most of the original members left the group from late 2009 to early 2010. Some have publicly denounced the organization.

Yousef Al Khattab, a co-founder, left the organization in December 2009 and went to Morocco. From there he published statements critical of it and its leaders. He said it had become a haven for what he described as "Muslim misfits." Hours after he pleaded guilty, he also posted a message on his Facebook page renouncing his former views as "disgusting" and not representative of Islam, and asking forgiveness for them. He served 85% of his 30-month sentence and was released from federal prison on August 2, 2016. While Yousef has denounced his former over the top interviews and online posts as well as sincerely apologizing for his uneducated and non-Sunni misunderstanding of Islam, he refused to become a government informant as can be seen in his sentencing minutes and pre-trial minutes.

Jesse Curtis Morton, a co-founder, was sentenced to 11 1/2 years in federal prison. He became a prison informant for the FBI and was released after serving only 3 years of an 11 1/2-year sentence. After his release he began work as a counterterrorism researcher at George Washington University and was seen as a shining example of the countering violent extremism (CVE) industry. Since his denouncing of his former beliefs and ideologies, Morton gave support to the Ahmadiyya Movement on more than one occasion by giving them interviews and retweeting their website links. Morton died December 21, 2021, at the age of 43, and is buried in Melbourne, Florida.

David Scott Jones (pen name Abdullah as-Sayf Jones) is another former leader who has left and denounced the organization. He left for religious reasons, saying he had become an Ash'ari Sunni Sufi and then a few months later an observant of Sh'ia Islam. He realized that Islam was not all about hate. He later explained in a collection of online posts that he was concerned with the direction of RM and did not want to be part of it. Today he actively speaks against organizations such as Revolution Muslim and works with Muslim youth to keep them from being attracted to extremist groups.

He had a series of online debates with Jesse Curtis Morton, aka Younes Abdullah Muhammad, who fled from New York to Morocco in November 2010. Morton was arrested in Morocco in 2011 and tried in federal district court in Alexandria, Virginia, for soliciting murder through the Revolution Muslim website, as he was part of the threats against the South Park creators and published addresses related to them. He pleaded guilty to three charges.
