= Loaded sock =

Makeshift weapon

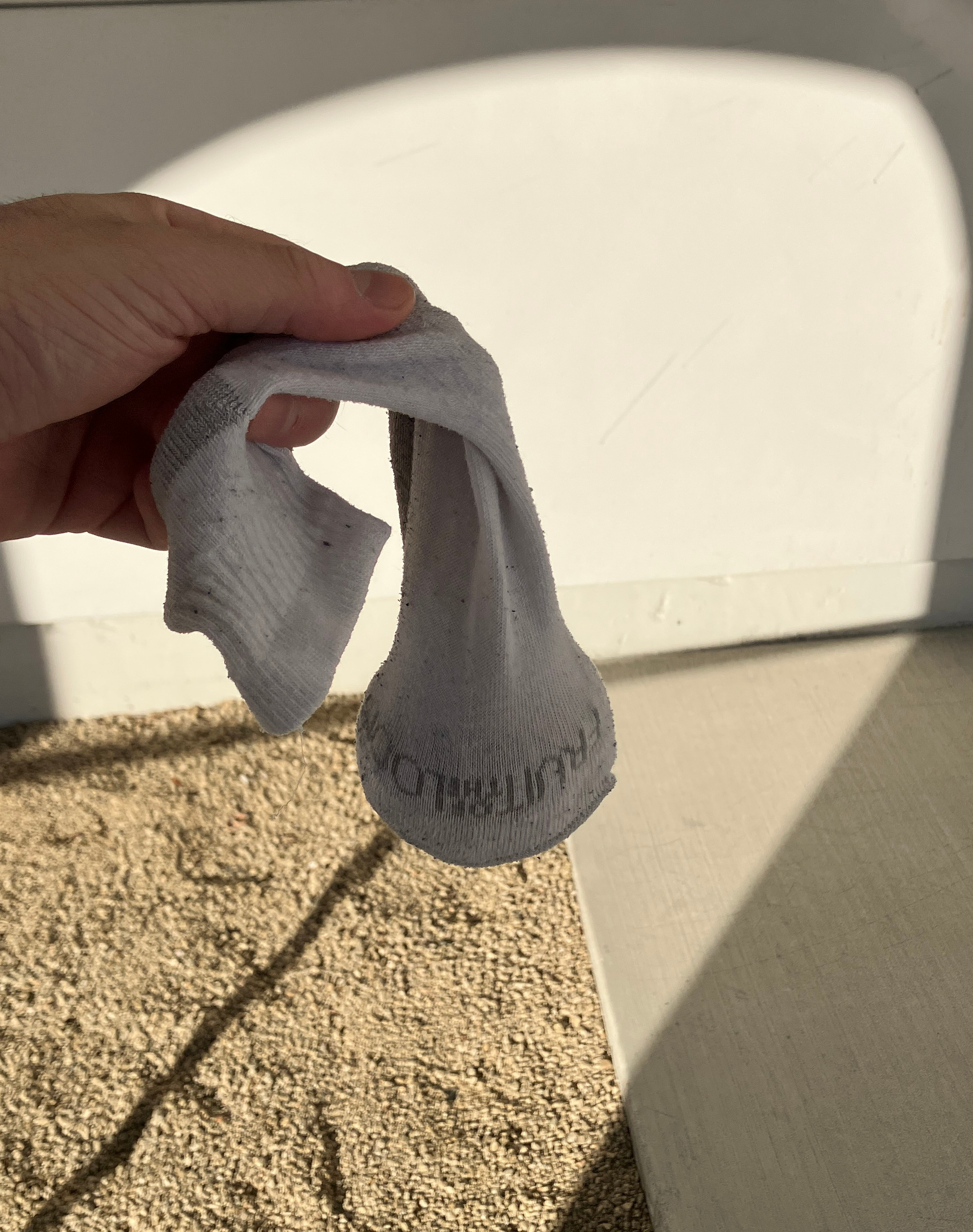
Loaded sock with a billiards ball inside.

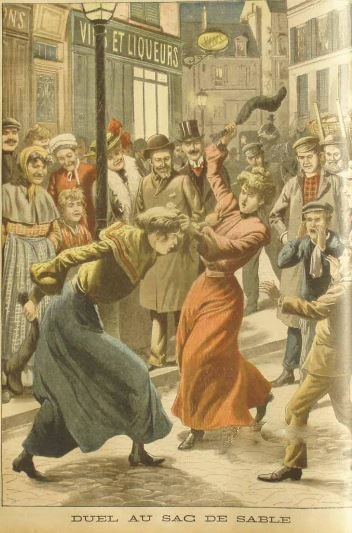
A duel between Louise Henin and Andrée Merle in Paris in 1921, seen here hitting each other with loaded socks full of sand, as drawn by Le Petit Journal. In this era, socks loaded with sand were known as "sandbags."

A loaded sock (or stocking), also known as a weighted sock, cosh, slungshot, blackjack, sap, or beaner is any common form of sock or stocking filled or stuffed with hard items to be used as a blunt force makeshift weapon, often with the intent to murder. The socks can also be filled with lighter items like a bar of soap, or wet sand, to mutilate or seriously injure the target. Socks might also be loaded with pennies or other coins, rocks, locks, dominoes, or other hard items.

== Derived terms ==
A common phrase used to describe hitting someone with a loaded sock is to sock it to them, which has since evolved to mean generally winning something. The colloquialism or reference term – many of them neologistic – which describes the loaded sock depends on what the sock has been loaded with. A sock loaded with one or more rocks is often called a rock in a sock, or a rock sock, just as one with a lock has been called a lock in a sock, or lock sock, this pattern might follow for any other object.

== Military use ==
Loaded socks have been used in guerrilla warfare and irregular warfare for hundreds of years, such as those used by British scouts during the Second Boer War to silently kill sentries during the Relief of Mafeking. The authors of Colonel Z write that this battle was: "...another opportunity for Claude Dansey to take his loaded sock to the sentries..." Loaded socks have been used as weapons during protests against police or paramilitary forces. They might occasionally be used as projectile weapons. Loaded socks are often used in blanket parties as part of military hazing rituals, such as at basic training, or during the Crossing the Line Ceremony of many navies.

== Wider use ==
Loaded socks are also used by members of gangs and organized crime as methods of physical intimidation during protection racket schemes. In the Victorian era, loaded socks with sand in them were known as sandbags, and gangs like the Peaky Blinders and the Sluggers often made use of them. Loaded socks can also be used in muggings, as was done in the 1700s by filling a stocking with sand or leadshot.

Loaded socks are used in common forms of prison violence. Loaded socks in prisons are usually filled with hard items, but can also often be filled with sharp objects like blades. Other prisoners might prefer loading socks with plug sockets. Loaded socks are often used during prison escapes, such as the one used at New Jersey State Prison in 1909. Some loaded socks are stuffed with single soup cans.

Loaded socks have been used as forms of sexual violence and physical abuse in domestic relationships.

== In popular culture ==
- In the film Scum, Carlin loads a sock with two snooker balls to make an improvised cosh, subsequently to be used in an attack.
- In the film Full Metal Jacket, loaded socks filled with bars of soap are used to beat a USMC recruit named Private Leonard "Gomer Pyle" Lawrence, played by Vincent D'Onofrio.
- In a match of World Championship Wrestling at the Richmond Coliseum on June 17, 1996, Big Bubba assaulted John Tenta with a loaded sock.
- In an episode of Prison Break, Bellick hits Mahone with a loaded sock to secure the top bunk.
- Loaded socks are mentioned in the December 1979 issue of Alfred Hitchcock's Mystery Magazine.
- In End of Watch by Stephen King, Holly kills Hartsfield with a loaded sock called the Happy Slapper.
- In an episode of Seinfeld, The Reverse Peephole, Kramer is afraid someone might hit him with a "sock full of pennies."
- In the series iCarly, the character Sam Puckett uses a loaded sock that she calls the "butter sock."
- In an episode of the reality show The Only Way Is Essex, a character gets arrested for assaulting someone at a Walmart using a loaded sock.
- One of the characters in Thicker Than Water, Diamond Tankard, is arrested for using a loaded sock with rocks.
- In the video game The Outlast Trials, the trial "Locksock the Warden" has reagents killing a warden with loaded socks

== See also ==
- Sticky bomb
- Millwall brick
