= Shiv =

Improvised knife-like weapon

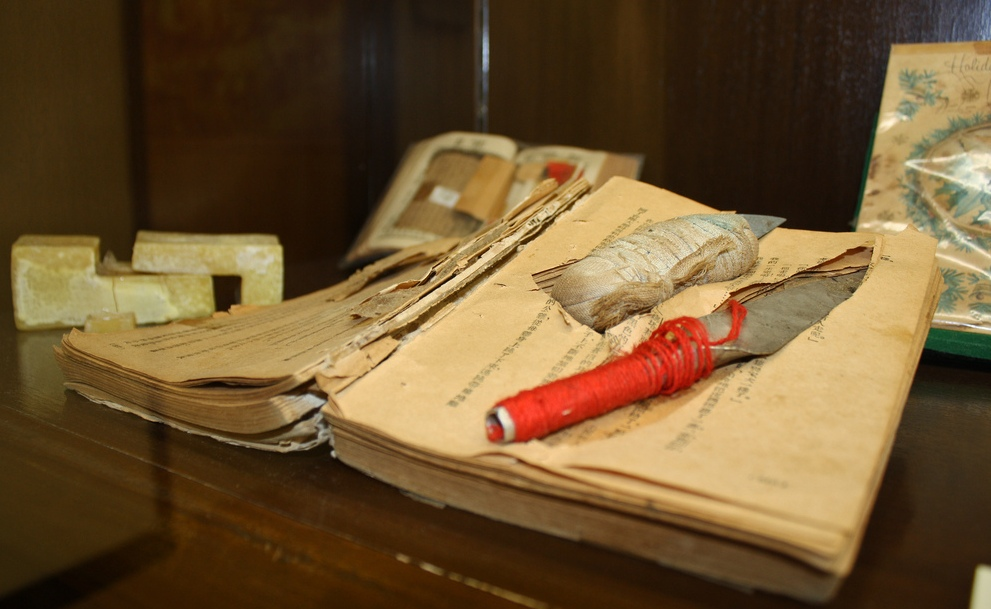
Shivs hidden in a book, Hong Kong

A shiv (also chiv or shivvie) or shank is an improvised pointed or bladed prison weapon resembling a knife.

The word shiv is recorded from the 1670s (in the spelling chive) as cant for "knife". The exact spelling shiv is recorded in underworld slang from 1915. The cant word probably derives from the Romani word chiv "blade" (compare Romani chivomengro "knifeman"). The derived verb to shiv means "to stab (someone) with a shiv", and a shivver is an archaic term for a criminal who attacks victims with a knife.

Since weapons are prohibited in prisons, the intended mode of concealment is central to a shiv's construction. An especially thin handle, for instance, makes it easier to conceal in available cracks or crevices in the prison's construction, or in stacks of objects, such as books, permitted to the prisoners; however, this can also render the shiv difficult to grip and wield. Routine body searches in prison make it difficult to conceal a shiv on one's person on a continuous basis. As well as the prison authorities, it is also desirable to conceal possession of a shiv from members of rival prison populations.

== In the United States ==
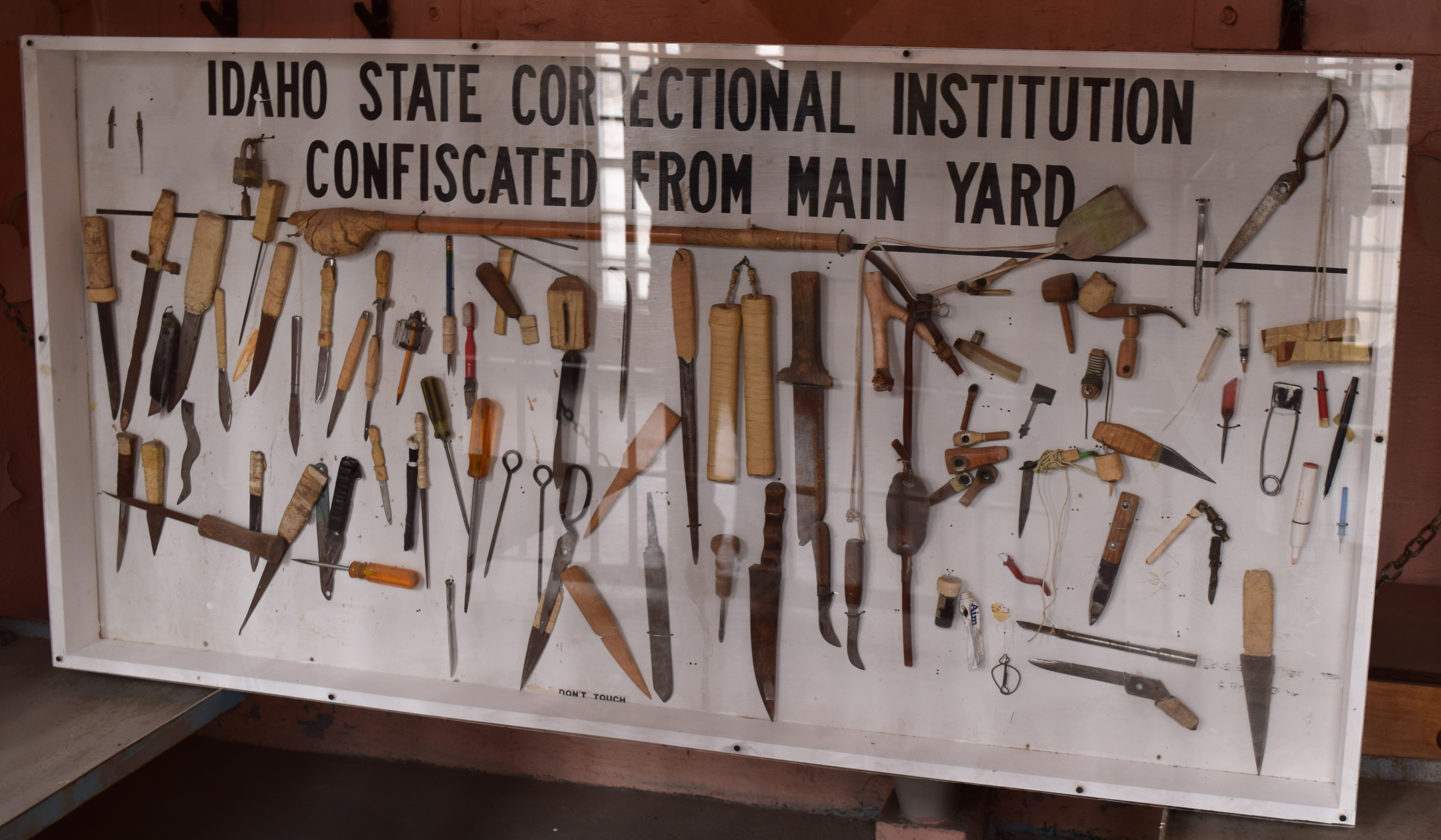
A display of contraband weapons at the Old Idaho Penitentiary museum

The word shank is American prison slang for an improvised stabbing weapon. Shanks can be made in various ways: a razor blade stuck into the melted end of a toothbrush; a metal bucket handle filed into a sharp point; or simply a hank of chicken wire twisted back on itself.

The term apparently originates from the fact that in the 19th century men's boots were (and most work boots still are) often equipped with a shank (that is, a central rib providing arch support) of steel, which could be extracted and improvised into a weapon. This threat was well known to prison guards in the 19th century, as shown by this description from 1882:

[Guiteau's] old shoes were taken from him and others promised him. The necessity for this rule requiring a prisoner to leave his boots or shoes which he wears on arrival at the jail with the officers, is found in the fact that in many boots and shoes are steel or iron shanks, which prisoners sharpen when they can get them, and make what are in prison slang known as "cheesers," with which they might do damage.

In Guiteau's day, the reported slang term was cheeser; but the slang noun shank was in use by 1989.

In institutions managed by the Federal Bureau of Prisons, weapons, sharpened instruments, and knives are considered contraband and their possession is punishable as a highest severity-level prohibited act.

== In Britain ==
In Britain, the word shiv may also be spelled chiv, and the word shank has become increasingly used in contemporary British slang and used primarily in gang and street contexts.

In the 1950s, British criminal Billy Hill described his use of a "chiv":

I was always careful to draw my knife down on the face, never across or upwards. Always down. So that if the knife slips you don't cut an artery. After all, chivving is chivving, but cutting an artery is usually murder. Only mugs do murder.
