= Bucyrus High School =

Location
- 900 West Perry Street; Bucyrus, Ohio 44820; United States
- Coordinates: 40°48′45″N 82°59′17″W

Information
- Type: Public, Coeducational
- School district: Bucyrus City School District
- Principal: Jaivir Singh
- Teaching staff: 20.00 (FTE)
- Grades: 6–12
- Student to teacher ratio: 12.35
- Colors: Red and white
- Athletics conference: Northern 10 Athletic Conference
- Team name: Redmen
- Rival: Wynford High School
- Website: www.bucyrusschools.org/o/secondary

Bucyrus High School is a public high school in Bucyrus, Ohio, United States. The school is administered together with Bucyrus Middle School as the Bucyrus Secondary School, and serves students in grades six through twelve in the Bucyrus City School District. Athletic teams are known as the Redmen and the school colors are red and white.

== Athletics ==
=== State championships ===
- Girls Softball – 1990

=== Athletic league affiliations ===
- North Central Ohio League: 1919–1932, 1936–1945
- Northern Ohio League: 1944–2002
- North Central Conference: 2002–2014
- Northern 10 Athletic Conference: 2014–present

== Notable alumni ==
- Harry L. Martin, Medal of Honor recipient
- Walt Schupp, professional football player
- Cecil Souders, professional football player
- Edward Vollrath, U.S. Army brigadier general
- Matthew Alan Livelsberger- bomber in the 2025 attack on Trump International Hotel Las Vegas
