= Colonel Crawford High School =

Public high school near North Robinson, Ohio, United States

Location
- 2303 State Route 602; North Robinson, Ohio 44856; United States
- Coordinates: 40°47′18″N 82°51′40″W

Information
- Type: Public
- School district: Colonel Crawford Local School District
- Principal: Mike Voll
- Teaching staff: 17.45 (FTE)
- Grades: 9–12
- Student to teacher ratio: 14.38
- Colors: Black and gold
- Athletics conference: Northern 10 Athletic Conference
- Team name: Eagles
- Rival: Wynford Royals
- Accreditation: Ohio Department of Education
- Website: colonelcrawfordoh.sites.thrillshare.com/page/high-school

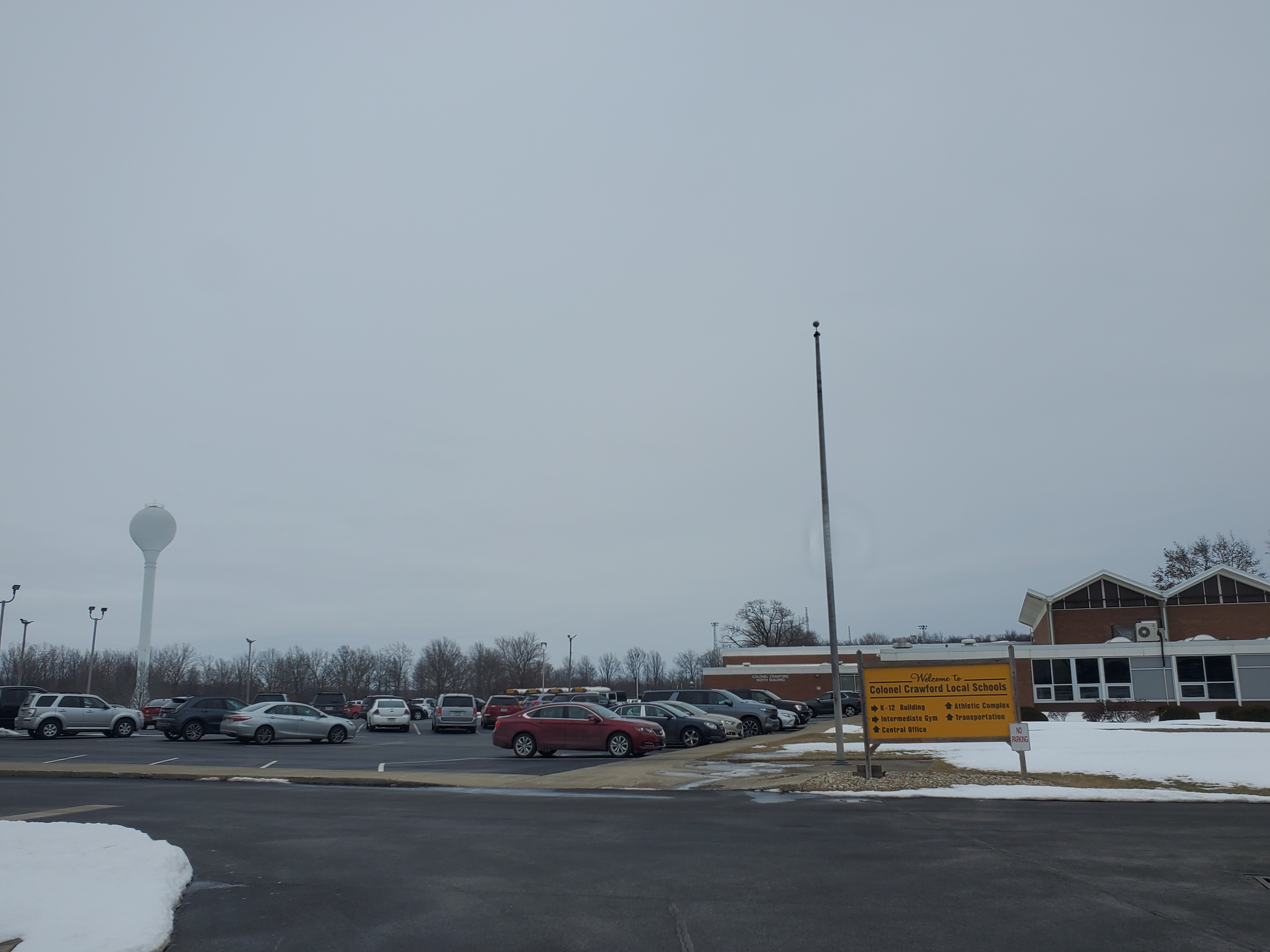
Colonel Crawford High School.jpg

Colonel Crawford High School is a public high school in Whetstone Township, near North Robinson, Ohio, United States. It is the only high school in the Colonel Crawford Local School District. The school had an enrollment of 281 students as of the 2018–19 school year and the principal is Jake Bruner. The school is named for Colonel William Crawford. The St. Lawrence Continental Divide passes through the northern portion of the campus.

== Athletics ==
=== State championships ===
- Girls track and field – 1990, 1991, 1992, 2022
- Girls softball – 1995
- Boys track and field – 2010
