= Parachute Nurse =

1942 film by Charles Barton

- Original film poster
- Directed by: Charles Barton
- Written by: Elizabeth Meehan (story); Rian James
- Produced by: Wallace MacDonald; Irving Briskin
- Starring: Marguerite Chapman; William Wright; Kay Harris
- Cinematography: Philip Tannura
- Edited by: Mel Thorsen
- Music by: John Leipold (uncredited)
- Distributed by: Columbia Pictures
- Release date: August 6, 1942
- Running time: 63 minutes
- Country: United States
- Language: English

Parachute Nurse is a 1942 Columbia Pictures film based on the Aerial Nurse Corps of America. The film was directed by Charles Barton.

== Plot ==
Inspired by a visit from their old friend Lieutenant Mullins, an officer in the Aerial Nurse Corps, nurses Glenda White and Dottie Morrison decide to enlist in the Paranurses, an elite unit of nurses that parachute into hard-to-reach areas to aid injured soldiers. At the training center, Glenda and Dottie are assigned to the squad led by Captain Jane Morgan. At the cantina, the two nurses befriend Gretchen Ernst, a cadet who is being ostracized because her brother is an officer in the German army.

Lieutenant Jim Woods is assigned to teach the recruits the proper jumping procedure, and after a day of diving off the platform, they are bruised and sore. Granted a pass for the evening, Glenda and Dottie hitch a ride on a truck bound for town and discover that Woods and Sergeant Jeff Peters are also passengers on the truck. The four dine together and by evening's end, Glenda has paired off with Woods and Jeff and Dottie have become a couple.

When they return to the base, Helen Ames, another recruit, accuses Glenda of trying to steal the lieutenant from her. One of the cadets' first next lessons is in how to pack a parachute. When Woods announces that he plans to test Glenda's chute on the demonstration dummy, Helen ties a knot in the lines. When the lines foul as the chute opens, Woods blames Glenda for packing it incorrectly and orders her to spend three days packing and unpacking parachutes.

Suspecting foul play, Dottie tells Jeff that she thinks someone deliberately tied a knot in Glenda's chute. Grateful for Glenda's sympathy, Gretchen offers to help her pack the chutes, and when they finish, the two women go to a dance, where Gretchen is once again snubbed.

When Woods asks Glenda for a dance, she angrily tells him off and returns to the barracks. On the day of Gretchen's first jump, Glenda presents her with a good luck charm. When Gretchen jumps, however, she fails to pull the cord and falls to her death. After witnessing her friend's demise, Glenda becomes hysterical and is hospitalized. She recovers just in time to join her squadron for their first jump, but when the moment comes for Glenda to parachute from the plane, she freezes in terror. Delighted by Glenda's failure, Helen calls her "yellow." Learning of Helen's vicious behavior, Capt. Morgan forces her to resign from the force.

After Glenda refuses a second chance to accomplish her jump, she is transferred to the ambulance corps. As she prepares to leave the barracks, she overhears Jeff tell Dottie that Woods's plane has crashed in a remote area and that a nurse must parachute in to aid the injured officer.

Begging Capt. Morgan to assign her to the mission to save Woods, with whom she has fallen in love, Glenda straps on her parachute, puts her fears behind her and jumps from the plane. Upon landing, she discovers that Woods is unharmed and that his accident was a ruse to help her overcome her anxiety.

== Cast ==
- Marguerite Chapman - Glenda White
- William Wright - Lt. Woods
- Kay Harris - Dottie Morrison
- Lauretta Schimmoler - Jane Morgan
- Louise Allbritton - Helen Ames
- Forrest Tucker - Lt. Tucker
- Frank Sully - Sgt. Peters
- Diedra Vale - Ruby Stark
- Evelyn Wahl - Gretchen Ernst
- Shirley Patterson - Katherine Webb
- Eileen O'Hearn - Mary Mack
- Roma Aldrich - Nita Dominick
- Marjorie Riordan - Wendie Holmes
- Catherine Craig - Lt. Mullins
- Douglas Wood - Maj. Devon
- Marie Windsor - Company 'C' Girl

== Aerial Nurse Corps ==
The Aerial Nurse Corps of America was created in 1936 by Lauretta M. Schimmoler. Although never officially recognised the unit was regarded as the predecessor of the United States Air Force Nurse Corps. Schimmoler was technical advisor and appears in the film as a Captain.
