= Livelsberger =

Livelsberger is a Swiss surname. Notable people with the surname include:

- Matthew Livelsberger (fl. 2025), driver in the 2025 Las Vegas Cybertruck explosion
- Philip Livelsberger (born 1962), known professionally as Max Thrasher, American wrestler
