= Walt Schupp =

American football player and coach (1895–1941)

Profile
- Positions: Tackle, guard

Personal information
- Born: September 30, 1895; Bucyrus, Ohio
- Died: August 10, 1941 (aged 45); Cleveland, Ohio
- Listed height: 6 ft 0 in (1.83 m)
- Listed weight: 185 lb (84 kg)

Career information
- High school: Bucyrus (OH)
- College: Miami (OH)

Career history

Playing
- Cincinnati Celts (1921)

Coaching
- Leetonia High School (1923); Cleveland West High School (1924–1940)

Career statistics
- Games played: 4
- Games started: 4
- Stats at Pro Football Reference

Walter Lee Schupp (September 30, 1895 – August 10, 1941) was an American football tackle, guard, and coach who played one season in the American Professional Football Association (APFA) for the Cincinnati Celts. He played college football for Miami (OH) and was a high school coach for eighteen years afterwards until his death in 1941.

== Early life and education ==
Walt Schupp was born on September 30, 1895, in Bucyrus, Ohio. He attended Bucyrus High School before playing college football at Miami University (OH). He earned a varsity letter in 1916 before his career was interrupted by World War I. He served in the United States Army from 1917 to 1918, and also played for a military service football team. He returned in 1919, and graduated in 1920. He was named all-Ohio in his final two seasons.

== Professional career ==
A year after graduating college, Schupp was given a contract in professional football by the Cincinnati Celts, who played in the American Professional Football Association (APFA) (renamed the National Football League in 1922). He was named starting right tackle prior to their week one game against the Akron Pros. Playing against the Pros, defending champions, the Celts lost 0–41 in front of 2,500 fans. "The Celts had their only chance to score in the last quarter," reported the Pittsburgh Daily Post. "When Schupp blocked one of Kramer's passes behind Akron's line and raced for the goal. He was overtaken on the 10-yard line by Bailey, where the ball was lost on downs."

Schupp remained starter for their week three game against the Muncie Flyers; a game scheduled against the Canton Bulldogs one week prior had been cancelled. The Celts recorded their first APFA win against the Flyers, shutting them out 14–0 at Walnut Street Stadium in Muncie, Indiana. Prior to their next game versus the Cleveland Tigers, the Cleveland Plain Dealer advertised him as one of the best players on the Celts roster. Schupp earned his third start that week, as the Celts lost 0–28 against the Indians, who included Jim Thorpe on the roster. Two non-league opponents were then scheduled: against the Fort Wayne Pros, making their professional debut, on November 6, and the Middletown Miamis on November 20.

The Celts came victorious against the Fort Wayne Pros, scoring 13 points and allowing none. The Celts won their second consecutive game versus the Miamis, beating them by a score of 21–14. Schupp would play in one more game during the season, starting at tackle during a 0–48 loss at the hands of the Evansville Crimson Giants. It would be Schupp's last game, and the Celts' last game as a member of the APFA. He finished his career with four games played, and four starts in the APFA.

== Later life and death ==
After his one season of professional football, Schupp spent 1922 as a teacher at Greenville High School. He spent the following year as a teacher and football coach for Leetonia High School. He moved to Cleveland one year later and became head football coach for Cleveland West High School. He spent the following seventeen seasons with the school, leading them to league championships in 1928 and 1934. At the time of his death, Schupp had become "one of the best known figures in Ohio scholastic football" and was the Northern Ohio representative on the football rules committee of the National High School Athletic Federation.

Schupp died on August 10, 1941, in Cleveland, at the age of 45 following a heart attack. It was induced by a blood transfusion he gave to the wife of a friend, reported The Dayton Herald.
