= Orbit Inn bombing =

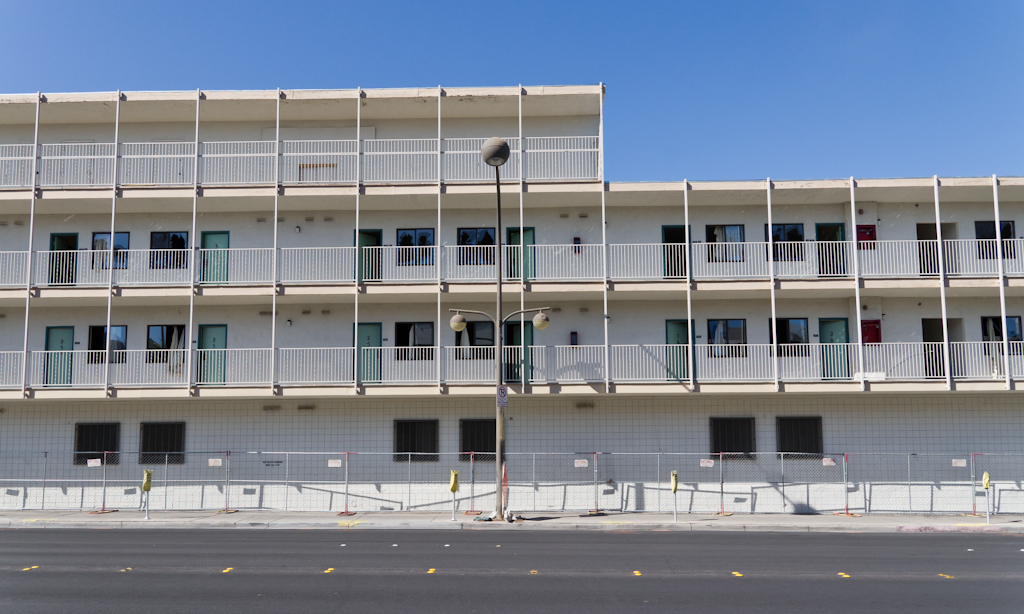
- The Orbit Inn motel in 2012
- Location: 36°10′3″N 115°8′19″W; Las Vegas, Nevada
- Date: January 7, 1967; 59 years ago
- Attack type: Bombing, suicide bombing
- Weapons: Dynamite, gun
- Deaths: 6 (including the perpetrator and his wife)
- Injuries: 8
- Perpetrator: Richard James Paris
- Motive: Undetermined, thought to be jealousy

On January 7, 1967, 28 year-old Richard James Paris detonated 50 sticks of dynamite at the Orbit Inn Motel in Las Vegas, Nevada, killing himself, his 22-year-old wife Christine, and four other people, as well as injuring 8 other people. Paris was allegedly angered at his wife over having an affair and detonated the dynamite by shooting it with a gun once she arrived back at the motel room. It was the deadliest explosion of any type in the history of the Las Vegas Valley.

== Aftermath ==
After the bombing, the Nevada State Legislature attempted to pass the Orbit Inn Act, which would have restricted the possession or sale of high explosives for individuals who did not have authorization to handle such material. Facing opposition from the mining industry, the bill did not pass in the legislature.

== Victims ==
=== Dead ===
- Christine Paris, 22
- George Brooks, 68
- Arnell Brooks, 57
- John Auwaerter, 60
- Lillian Auwaerter, 58

=== Injured ===
- Jim Mahan, 24
- Bobbie Mahan, 22
- Steve March, 70
- Lewis Palmer, 60
- Laura Palmer, 65
- Charles Pearce, 73
- Essie Pearce, 74
- Unnamed eighth injured

== See also ==
- 2025 Las Vegas Cybertruck explosion, a bombing in Las Vegas almost 58 years later
- 2017 Las Vegas shooting, a shooting in Las Vegas that killed 61 people, including the perpetrator
- 2014 Las Vegas shootings, a shooting spree in Las Vegas that left 5 people dead including the two perpetrators
