= Wynford Middle School/High School =

Location
- 3288 Holmes Center Road; Bucyrus, Ohio 44820; United States
- Coordinates: 40°49′25″N 83°1′5″W

Information
- Type: Public middle and high school
- School district: Wynford Local Schools
- Superintendent: Forrest Trisler
- Principal: High: Julie Miller; Middle: Brent Konkle
- Teaching staff: High: 15.91 (FTE) (2021–22); Middle: 14.88 (2021–22)
- Grades: 6–12
- Enrollment: High: 347 (2021–22); Middle: 247 (2021–22)
- Student to teacher ratio: High: 21.81 (2021–22); Middle: 16.60 (2021–22)
- Campus type: Rural
- Colors: Royal blue and gray
- Athletics conference: Northern 10 Athletic Conference
- Sports: Football; bowling; swimming; basketball; cross country; track & field; softball; baseball; golf; volleyball
- Mascot: Lion
- Team name: Royals
- Rival: Bucyrus High School
- Accreditation: Ohio Department of Education
- Newspaper: The Royal Times
- Website: wynfordroyals.org

Wynford Middle School/High School is a public middle school and high school near Bucyrus, Ohio, United States, in Holmes Township. It serves all students in grades six through twelve in the Wynford Local School District. The school was established in 1963 as Wynford High School for grades nine through twelve and was combined with the middle school in 2020 after the completion of the current facilities on the same campus. Athletic teams are known as the Royals and the school colors are royal blue and gray.
