= The Devil's Trail (1942 film) =

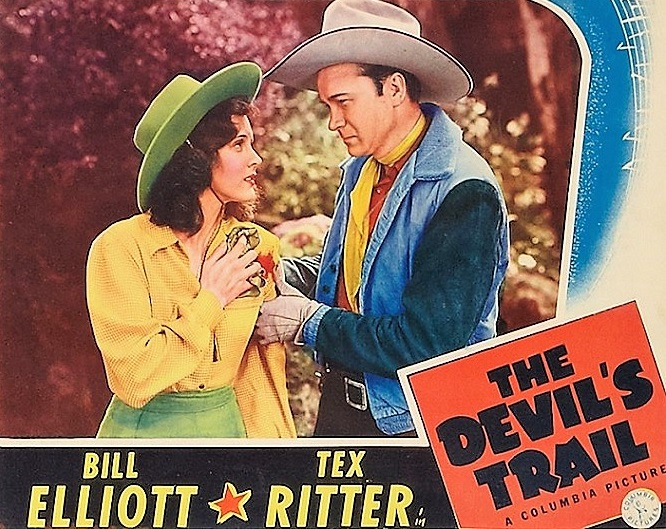
- Directed by: Lambert Hillyer
- Screenplay by: Robert Lee Johnson
- Produced by: Leon Barsha
- Starring: Wild Bill Elliott; Tex Ritter; Eileen O'Hearn
- Cinematography: George Meehan
- Edited by: Charles Nelson
- Production company: Columbia Pictures
- Distributed by: Columbia Pictures
- Release date: May 14, 1942
- Running time: 60 minutes
- Country: United States
- Language: English

The Devil's Trail is a 1942 American Western film directed by Lambert Hillyer. It is the eleventh in Columbia Pictures' series of 12 "Wild Bill" Hickok films.

== Cast ==
- Wild Bill Elliott as Wild Bill Hickok
- Tex Ritter as Tex Martin
- Eileen O'Hearn as Myra
- Frank Mitchell as Cannonball
- Noah Beery as Buck McQuade
- Ruth Ford as Ella
- Joel Friedkin as Dr. Willowby
- Joe McGuinn as Jim Randall
- Edmund Comb as Sid Howland
- Tristram Coffin as Ed Scott
