= Port Bucyrus–Crawford County Airport =

Public use airport in Bucyrus, Ohio

Port Bucyrus/Crawford County Airport
- IATA: none; ICAO: none; FAA LID: 17G

Summary
- Owner: City of Bucyrus
- Operator: Detray Aviation
- Serves: Bucyrus, Ohio
- Location: Crawford County, Ohio
- Time zone: UTC−05:00 (-5)
  - Summer (DST): UTC−04:00 (-4)
- Elevation AMSL: 1,007.8 ft (307.2 m)
- Coordinates: 40°46′53″N 82°58′29″W

Map
- Location within Ohio Location within the United States

Runways
Direction	Length		Surface
Direction	ft	m	Surface
4/22	3,895	1,187	Asphalt

Statistics (2021)
- Aircraft movements: 18,980
- Source: Federal Aviation Administration

The Port Bucyrus/Crawford County Airport (FAA LID: 17G) is a publicly owned, public use airport located 1 mile south of Bucyrus in Crawford County, Ohio, United States. The airport sits on 144 acres at an elevation of 1007 feet.

== History ==
The airport began when Lauretta Schimmoler persuaded the owner of an airport where she worked to move his facility from Sycamore, Ohio to Bucyrus. The airport opened on 64 acres (26 ha) one-half mile (0.80 km) south of the city on 24 November 1929.

It was announced that the airport would be called Port Bucyrus in late April 1931. Before the month was out, it began lobbying to be selected as a transfer point between airplanes on the Chicago Pittsburgh Air Express and trains on the Pennsylvania Railroad. A glider club, which had been established the year before, moved to the airport in mid May. The city council overrode the mayors veto in June to order the purchase of the airport. Despite this, Port Bucyrus had still not been acquired by the city when it was dedicated on 19 July 1931. This finally occurred in September. The month after it was announced that the airport would become a stop for Chicago and Eastern Airways, the city council again overrode the mayor's veto in February 1932 to approve the purchase of a hangar at the airport. The hangar and flight school closed the following month when Lauretta Schimmoler's lease on the airport expired.

The airport was again closed in late May 1939 after the death of its manager in an airplane crash. By 1940, a building for the storage of fuel and lubricants had been built, the parking lot enclosed with a cable and the runways partially flattened. A shop hangar was under construction in February 1946, and an 1,500-square-foot (140 m^{2}) administration building was completed the following May. The airport received a federal grant to surface its 2,600-foot (790 m) east–west runway in June 1956.

Encouraged by a proposal for a state grant by Governor Jim Rhodes, the city began planning the financing necessary to extend the runway in April 1965. The effort, which had started in November 1963, called for paving and lengthening the northeast–southwest runway to 4,000 feet (1,200 m) or more. As the grant was only available to county airports, the county commissioners were brought onboard in September 1965. By the end of the month the start of work on a master plan had been authorized. A $70,000 grant to the county for the airport was approved by the state in mid June 1966. The new 3,900-foot (1,200 m) runway was dedicated four months later on 23 October 1966.

John Fairburn became airport manager in 1968 and announced plans for more commercial operations. However, an apparent dispute over vouchers resulted in him being made directly responsible to city council. Relations soured further and the situation eventually came to a head in a heated mid March 1970 meeting. During the meeting, Fairburn alleged that he was losing money and was not able to obtain an ICC certificate. As a result, he stated that he would be ending his contract in June.

Heck Flying Service took over operation of the airport in October 1970. However, by 1975, complaints were being raised about the poor condition of the airport. An airport commission was created, but by early September 1976 the state of the field had further deteriorated to the point of being unsafe. Heck sent a letter to the city the following year, stating its intention to leave the airport due to its inability to make a profit. However, they reached an agreement to continue the contract a few days later.

By mid June 1984, the airport manager had not been paid in over three months. It was noted that, starting in 1968, the airport had gone through six manager changes in a little under thirteen years. A contrast was also drawn with the nearby Galion Municipal Airport, which had been much more successful.

By the end of January 1993, work had begun on a master plan for the airport. A proposal to lengthen the runway to 5,000 was announced at the start of May 1998. An additional 53 acres (21 ha) of land were purchased in 2002 to ensure it would remain open for future growth.

5.5 acres (2.2 ha) of land were donated to the airport in June 2014. The airport received a grant worth nearly $750,000 in 2017 to rehabilitate its main runway. In 2021, the airport received nearly $160,000 as part of the Infrastructure Investment and Jobs Act, which was aimed at counteracting inflation in the United States. After the recovery from the COVID-19 pandemic began, the airport began working on a number of infrastructure improvements to ease airport usage. In early 2022, the airport extended and resurfaced its parallel taxiway: 2,700 feet (820 m) were added so that it ran the entire length of the main runway. The airport also installed new lighting system. Part of the funds were used to combat pathogens at the airport. Later that year, the airport's request for funding to resurface aircraft parking areas was denied by the FAA over concerns on the placement of the airport's administration building. The airport subsequently developed a new master plan, but the FAA proposed an alternate solution before the new master plan was completed.

Ground was broken on a new terminal in December 2025.

== Facilities and aircraft ==
The airport has two runways. Runway 4/22 measures 3895 x 75 ft (1187 x 23 m) and is paved with asphalt. Runway 9/27 measures 2902 x 90 ft (885 x 27 m) and is made of turf. For the 12-month period ending September 16, 2021, the airport had 18,980 aircraft operations, an average of 52 per day. This included 97% general aviation, 3% air taxi, and <1% military. For the same time period, 31 aircraft were based at the airport, all airplanes: 30 single-engine and 1 multi-engine.

The airport has a fixed-base operator that sells avgas, and jet fuel is available on request. Other amenities include courtesy transportation, rental cars, a conference room, a crew lounge, snooze rooms, and showers.

== Accidents and incidents ==
- On 14 May 1939, a monoplane crashed at the airport, killing the two occupants.
- On March 7, 2014, a medical helicopter operated for the Cleveland Clinic made a precautionary landing at the Port Bucyrus-Crawford County Airport. An alarm reportedly sounded after a fire broke out in the helicopter's engine compartment, but there was no fire on the aircraft at any point.
- On June 2, 2017, an ultralight aircraft crashed while operating at the Port Bucyrus-Crawford County Airport. The pilot remembered having a structural problem with the aircraft. When he turned back for the airport to attempt a landing, the aircraft entered a nosedive from which the pilot could not recover. The aircraft crashed into a wooded area, and the pilot was taken to the hospital.
- On July 15, 2019, an experimental Alpi Pioneer 300 JS aircraft executed a forced landing onto a roadway next to the airport after running out of fuel midflight.

== See also ==
- List of airports in Ohio
