= Eileen O'Hearn =

American actress (1913–1992)

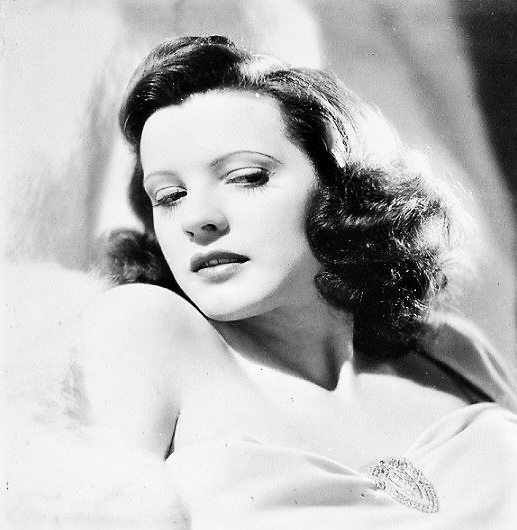
- O'Hearn in 1942
- Born: November 8, 1913; Kansas City, Missouri, U.S.
- Died: September 22, 1992 (aged 78); Kodiak Island, Alaska, U.S.
- Resting place: Kodiak Cemetery, Kodiak Island, Alaska
- Education: University of California
- Occupation: Actress
- Years active: 1941–1944
- Spouse: Fred Pate (m. 1942; died 1969)
- Children: 2

Eileen O'Hearn (November 8, 1913 – September 22, 1992) was an American actress. She is best known for appearing in The Richest Man in Town (1941), The Devil's Trail (1942) and Parachute Nurse (1942).

== Early life ==
Born in Kansas City, O'Hearn was the daughter of Mr. and Mrs. M. J. O'Hearn. When she lived in Kansas City, she studied voice and sang the title role in the opera Mignon. She attended UCLA, where she appeared in a production of Of Thee I Sing. Her other early acting experience included acting at the Westwood Community Theater and Pasadena Community Playhouse. She also appeared on television in Kansas City, Missouri. She was a stenographer for the Los Angeles Times when Columbia Pictures signed her after she took a screen test.

== Personal life and death ==
O'Hearn married Frederick Pate, an employee at Columbia studios, on March 7, 1942, in Yuma, Arizona. She moved to Kodiak Island, Alaska, where she entertained in a retirement home by singing and playing the piano. She died there in September 1992 at the age of 78.She is interred in Kodiak Cemetery.

== Filmography ==
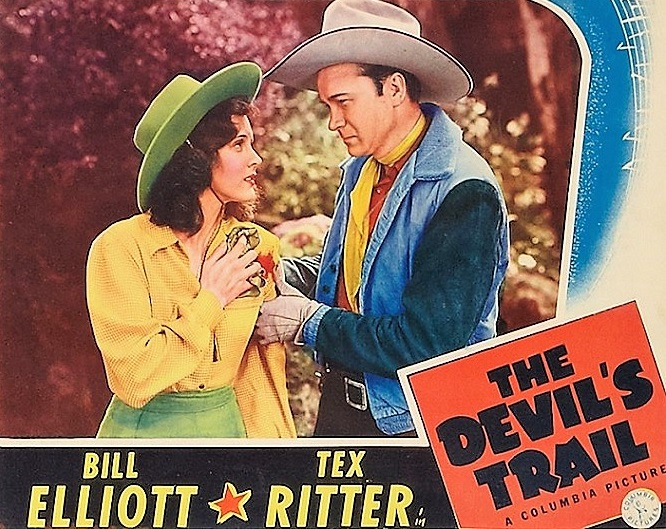
O'Hearn with Wild Bill Elliott in lobby card for The Devil's Trail (1942)

=== Film ===
| Year | Title | Role | Notes |
|---|---|---|---|
| 1941 | Thunder Over the Prairie | Nora Mandan | |
| 1941 | The Richest Man in Town | Mary Martin | |
| 1941 | Honolulu Lu | Debutante | (uncredited) |
| 1942 | The Man Who Returned to Life | Hettie | (uncredited) |
| 1942 | The Adventures of Martin Eden | Girl | (uncredited) |
| 1942 | Two Yanks in Trinidad | Medical Nurse | (uncredited) |
| 1942 | Alias Boston Blackie | Hotel Maid | (uncredited) |
| 1942 | Blondie's Blessed Event | Hospital Nurse | (uncredited) |
| 1942 | How Spry I Am | Mother | (short, uncredited) |
| 1942 | The Devil's Trail | Myra Willoughby | |
| 1942 | Not a Ladies' Man | Margaret Vance | |
| 1942 | Meet the Stewarts | Mary | (uncredited) |
| 1942 | Submarine Raider | Vera Lane | |
| 1942 | Parachute Nurse | Mary Mack | |
