= USNS 1st Lt. Harry L. Martin =

1st Lt. Harry L. Martin-class dry cargo ship

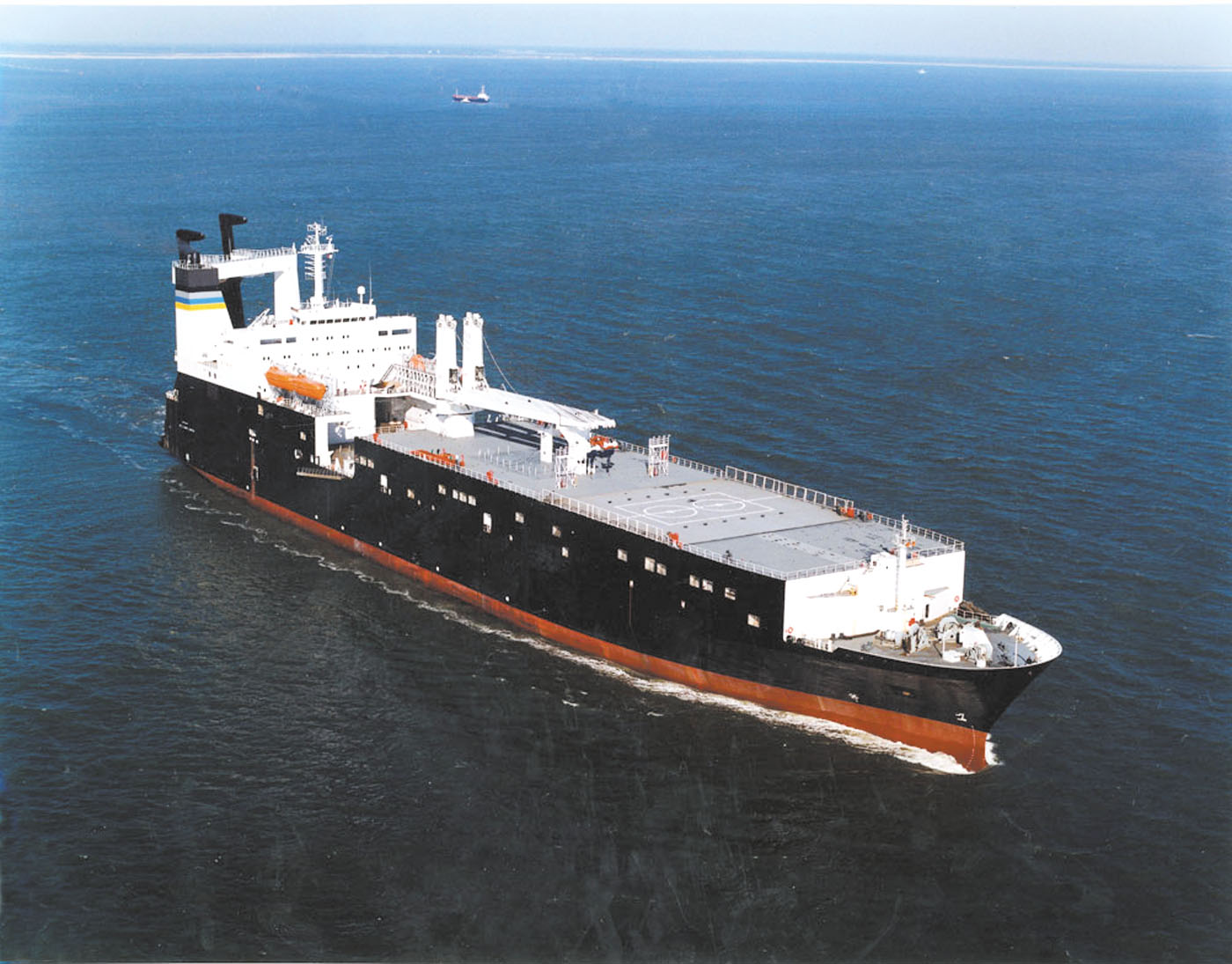
- USNS 1st Lt. Harry L. Martin

History

United States
- Name: 1st Lt. Harry L. Martin
- Namesake: Harry L. Martin
- Owner: Pacific Direct Line (1979–1988); Compagnie Générale Maritime (1988-1993); Norwegian America Line (1993-1994); Wilh. Wilhelmsen (1994-1995); Military Sealift Command (1995–present)
- Builder: Bremer Vulkan
- Completed: 1979
- Renamed: Lillooet (1979-1988); Rabelais (1988-1989); CGM Rabelais (1989-1993); NOSAC Cedar (1993-1994); Tarago (1994-2000)
- Stricken: 30 December 2021
- Identification: IMO number: 7720415; MMSI number: 338992000; Callsign: NDFH; Hull number: T-AK-3015
- Fate: Scrapped, 2022

General characteristics
- Class & type: 1st Lt. Harry L. Martin-class dry cargo ship
- Displacement: 19,588 t (19,279 long tons), light; 39,450 t (38,827 long tons), full
- Length: 754 ft 6 in (229.97 m)
- Beam: 76 ft 5 in (23.29 m)
- Draft: 42 ft 65 in (14.45 m)
- Installed power: 1 × shaft; 21,000 hp (16,000 kW)
- Propulsion: 1 × Burmeister & Wain K7SZ90/160 BL diesel engines
- Speed: 17–21 knots (31–39 km/h; 20–24 mph)
- Range: 1,600 nmi (3,000 km; 1,800 mi)
- Capacity: 126,841 sq. ft. vehicle; 13,200 gallons petroleum; 25,000 gallons water; 751 TEU
- Complement: 39 mariners
- Aviation facilities: Helipad

USNS 1st Lt. Harry L. Martin (T-AK-3015), was the only ship of the 1st Lt. Harry L. Martin-class cargo ship built in 1979. The ship is named after First Lieutenant Harry L. Martin, an American Marine who was awarded the Medal of Honor during World War II.

== Construction and commissioning ==
The ship was built in 1979 at the Fore River Shipyard, Quincy, Massachusetts.

On 1 August 1986, the Pacific Direct Line owned car carrier MV Lilllooet entered Sydney Harbour. In 1988, the ship was sold to CMA CGM and renamed Rabelais.

In 1993, Norwegian America Line acquired the ship and was renamed NOSAC Cedar until 1994. In 1994, the ship was acquired by the Wilh. Wilhelmsen and renamed Tarago. In 1995, the ship was purchased by the Military Sealift Command and was put into the Prepositioning Program and the Maritime Prepositioning Ship Squadron 3 on 20 April 2000. The ship operated in the Pacific Ocean, out of Saipan and Guam.

On 26 September 2013, the ship collided with the Mathews Bridge, Jacksonville while being towed to North Florida Shipyards at about 2 p.m. Florida Department of Transportation filed a lawsuit against the towing company after the collision costed $4 million in damage.

On 30 December 2021, Harry L. Martin was removed from service and sold for scrap.

== Gallery ==
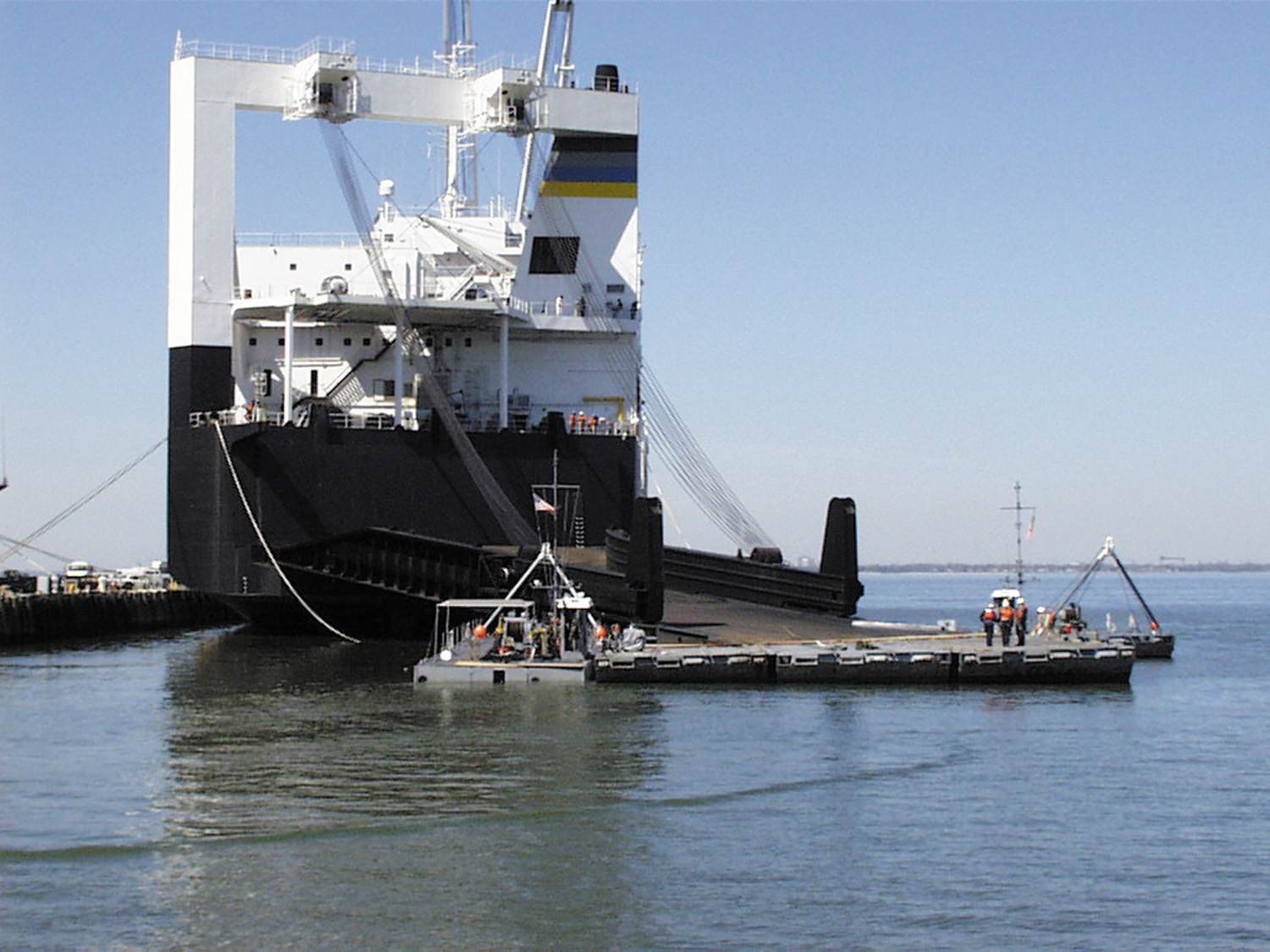
View of 1st Lt. Harry L. Martin from the aft

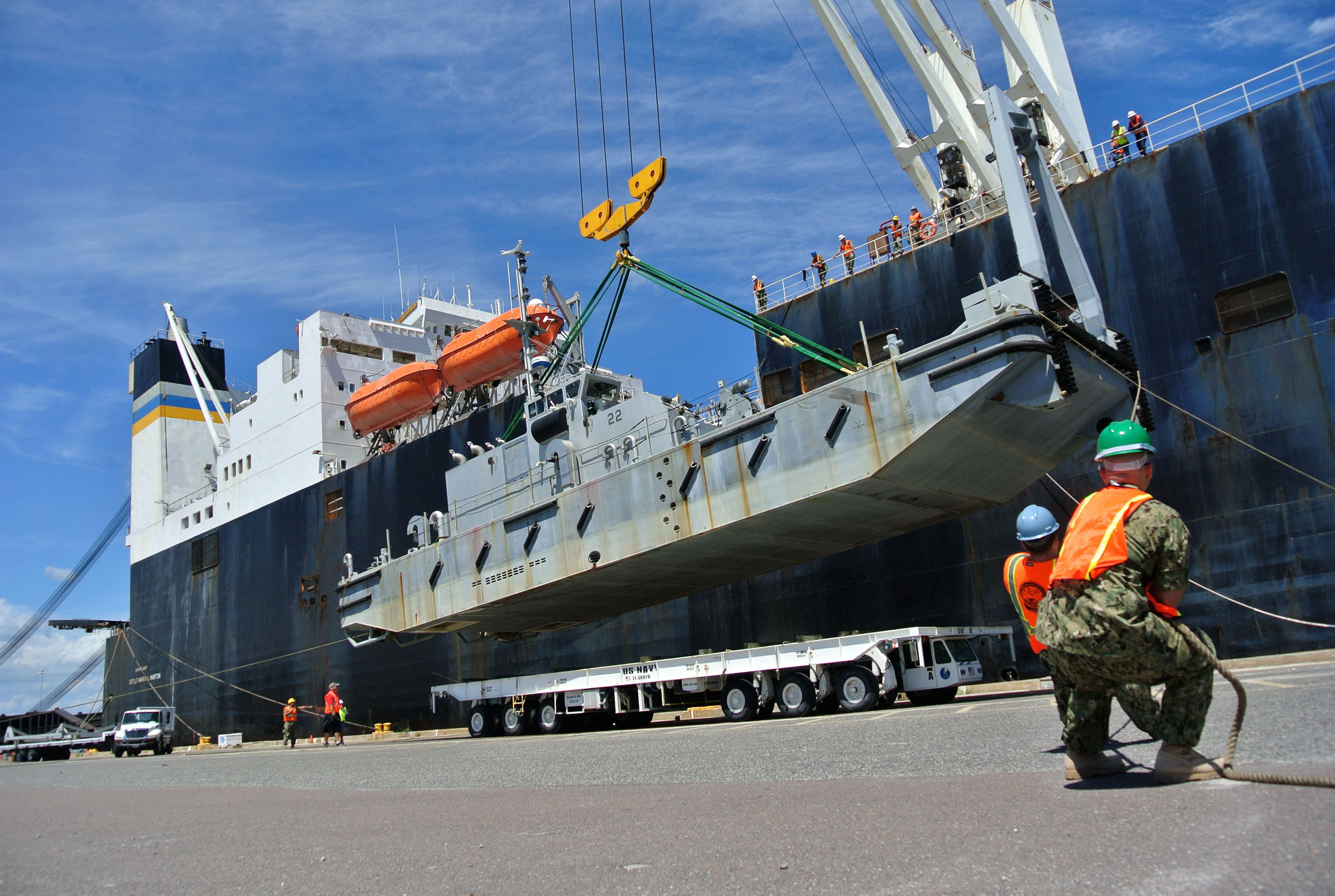
View of 1st Lt. Harry L. Martin from the starboard side

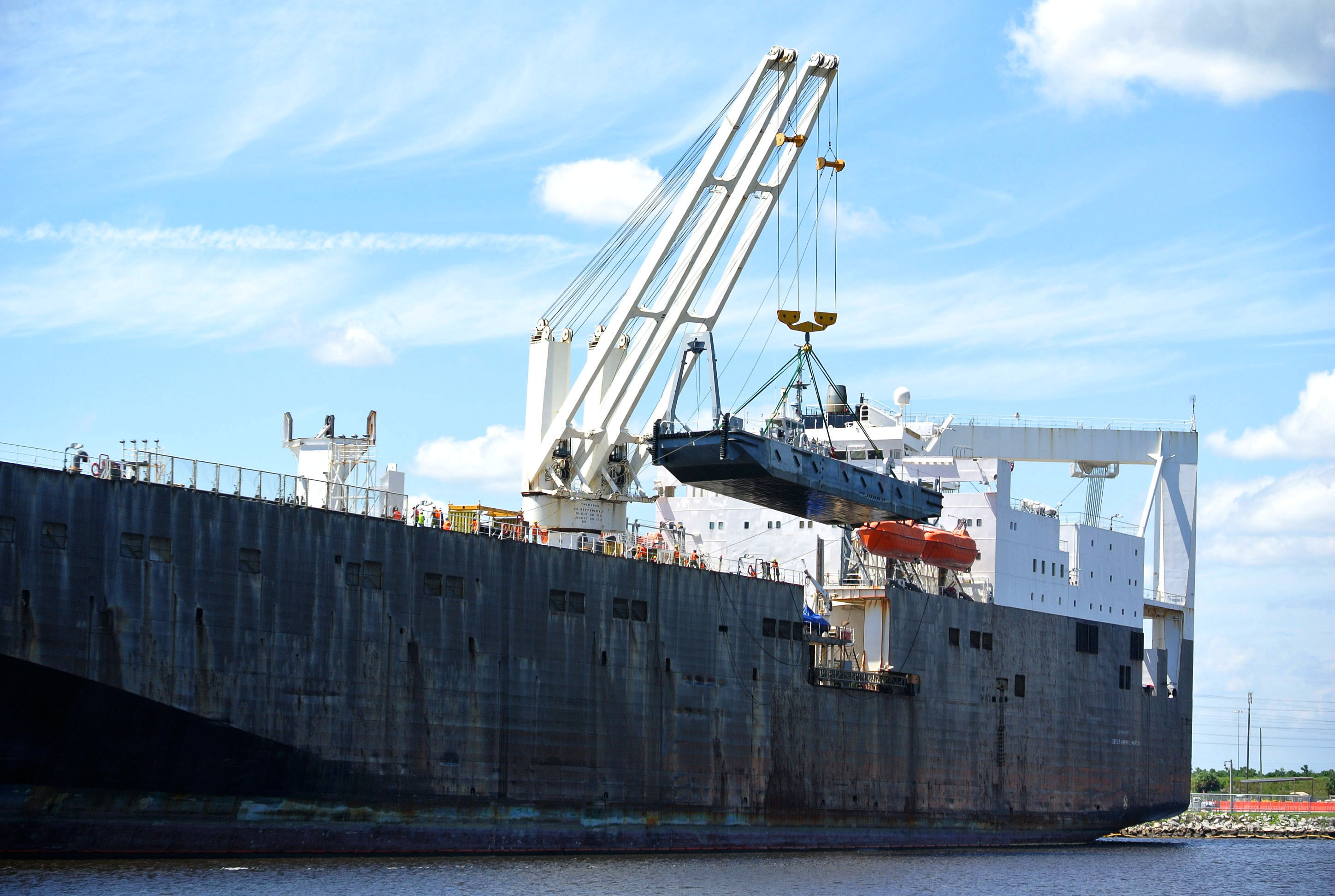
View of 1st Lt. Harry L. Martin from the port side

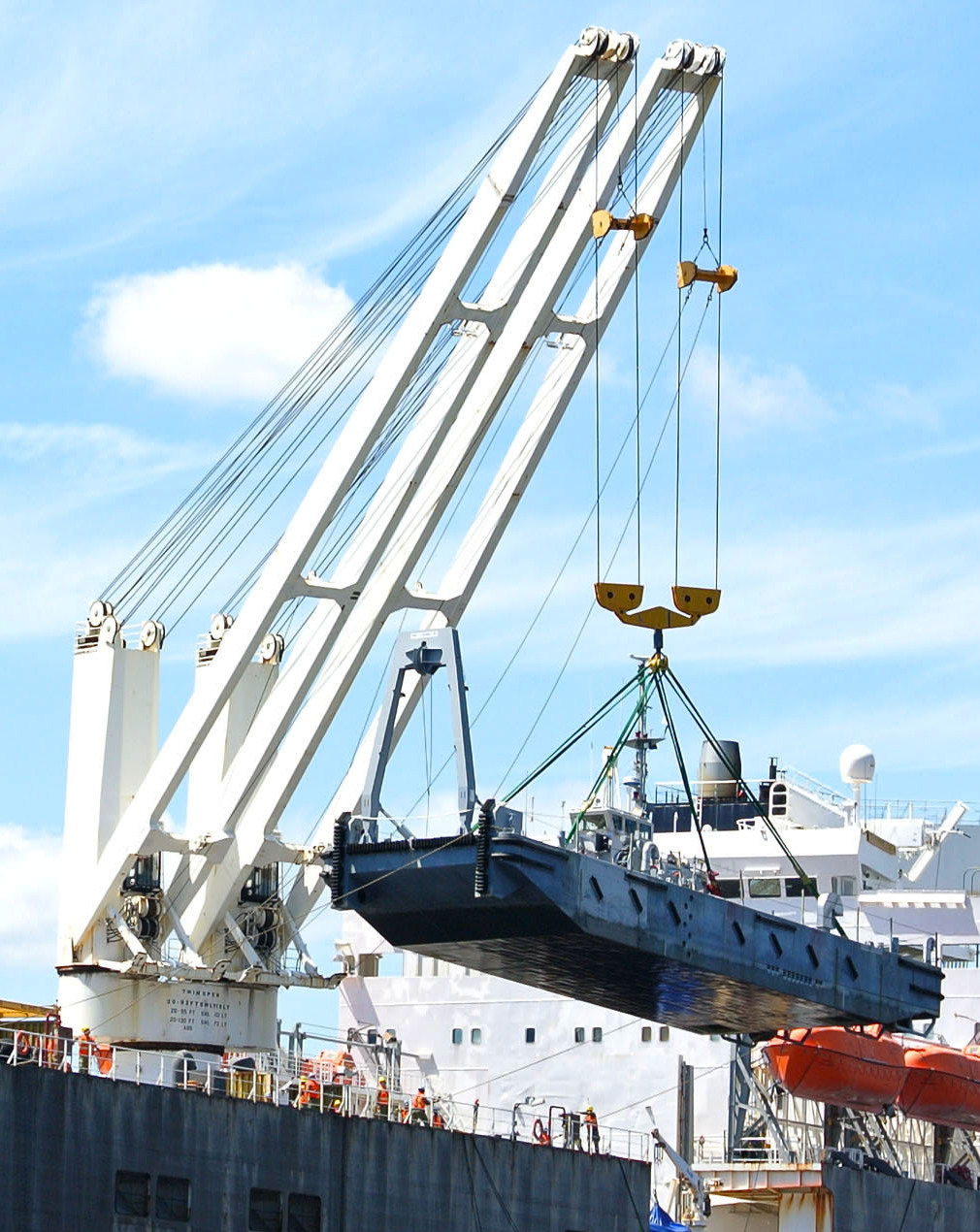
1st Lt. Harry L. Martin's crane
