= Bucyrus Bratwurst Festival =

- Status: active
- Genre: food festivals
- Frequency: Annually
- Location: Bucyrus, Ohio
- Coordinates: 40°48′22″N 82°58′23″W
- Country: United States
- Website: www.bucyrusbratwurstfestival.com

Bucyrus Bratwurst Festival is an annual celebration of bratwurst in Bucyrus, Ohio, United States. Bucyrus calls itself the "Bratwurst Capital of America."

The festival includes musical performances and a festival queens pageant.

== History ==
The festival was originally named Colonel Crawford Days before taking the name Bucyrus Bratwurst Festival in 1968. In 2020, the COVID-19 pandemic caused officials to scrap the festival and defer to 2021.
