= Cecil Souders =

American football player (1921–2021)

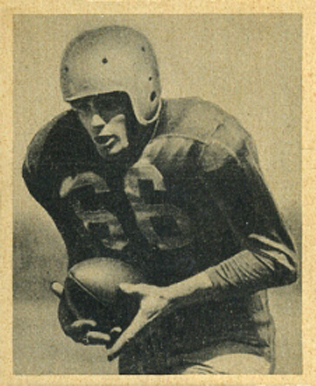
- Souders on a 1948 Bowman football card

No. 55, 82, 66
- Positions: End, tackle

Personal information
- Born: January 3, 1921; Bucyrus, Ohio, U.S.
- Died: August 30, 2021 (aged 100); Hilliard, Ohio, U.S.
- Listed height: 6 ft 1 in (1.85 m)
- Listed weight: 210 lb (95 kg)

Career information
- High school: Bucyrus
- College: Ohio State (1942-1944, 1946)
- NFL draft: 1945: 25th round, 259th overall pick

Career history
- Detroit Lions (1947–1949)

Awards and highlights
- National champion (1942); First-team All-Big Nine (1946)

Career NFL statistics
- Receptions: 17
- Receiving yards: 203
- Touchdowns: 1
- Stats at Pro Football Reference

Cecil Belvedire "Cy" Souders (January 3, 1921 – August 30, 2021) was an American professional football player. He played in the National Football League (NFL) with the Detroit Lions.

Until his death on August 30, 2021, he was reputedly the oldest living former NFL player.

== Early life ==
Souders was born in Bucyrus, Ohio. He played football for Bucyrus High School. He was team captain his senior year and was chosen to play with the Ohio High School All-Stars, which played against the Florida All-Stars in the Kumquat Bowl in St. Petersburg, Florida on December 26, 1938. He was captain of this team which played to a scoreless tie.

== College and military career ==
While at the Kumquat Bowl, Souders was recruited by Louisiana State University and planned to go there on a full scholarship. Returning to Ohio after the game, Ohio State University assistant coach Ernie Godfrey and Cy’s girlfriend, Jean Hoover, convinced him to stay in Ohio and play for OSU. Souders was a three-time college football All-American at OSU from 1942-1946. He also played in two East–West Shrine Games and one All Star game. He had been a member of the Buckeyes' "taxi squad" in 1939, but he left the team and was married. In 1942, he received a letter from new coach Paul Brown, and Souders returned to football, living near the stadium with wife Jean and daughter Sharon.

While on a two-year hiatus from Ohio State, he served in the United States Navy during World War II. He reported for duty during the 1944 season and served into late 1945.

== Professional career ==
Souders was drafted in the 25th round of the 1945 NFL draft by the Washington Redskins, but ended up playing three years with the Detroit Lions. In 1947 he played in 11 games (starting four) with 15 receptions for 184 yards and his only career touchdown. In 1948 he played in 12 games, starting six, with two receptions for 19 yards. In 1949, he played in 12 games, starting four, with no receptions. He ended his career with 17 receptions for 203 yards.

== Personal life ==
Souders and Jean Hoover, who was a Bucyrus High School cheerleader, were married in 1939 in Kentucky. After football, he was a salesman for Suburban Motor Freight Company, managing the Detroit terminal. After 38 years, he became executive vice president, retiring in 1984. As of 2019, Souders and his wife of 80 years, Jean, were living in Avon Park, Florida though later moved back to Ohio.

Souders died in Hilliard on August 30, 2021, at the age of 100.

In 2002, Souders was inducted into the Ohio State University Athletic Hall of Fame.

In 2016, he was inducted into the inaugural class of the Bucyrus City Schools Hall of Fame.
