= Wynford Local School District =

School district in Ohio, United States

Address
- 3288 Holmes Center Road Bucyrus, Ohio, 44820; United States
- Coordinates: 40°48′22″N 82°58′23″W

District information
- Type: Public
- Grades: PK–12
- Established: 1963; 63 years ago
- Superintendent: Forrest Trisler
- Schools: 3
- NCES District ID: 3904652

Students and staff
- Students: 1,079 (2025–2026)
- Teachers: 65.02 (on an FTE basis) (2025–2026)
- Staff: 137.37 (on an FTE basis) (2025–2026)
- Student–teacher ratio: 16.59 (2025–2026)

Other information
- Website: www.wynfordroyals.org

Wynford Local School District is a public school district serving students in the Bucyrus area in Crawford County, Ohio, United States. The school district enrolls 1,679 students as of the 2020–2021 academic year.

== Schools ==
=== Elementary schools ===
- Wynford Elementary School

=== Middle schools ===
Wynford Middle School

=== High schools ===
- Wynford High School
