= Bucyrus City School District =

School district in Ohio

Location
- 170 Plymouth Street, Bucyrus, OH 44820 Bucyrus, Ohio United States

District information
- Type: Public
- Grades: PK-12
- Superintendent: Robert Britton

Students and staff
- Students: 1,007
- Teachers: 67
- Staff: 112

Other information
- Website: www.bucyrusschools.org

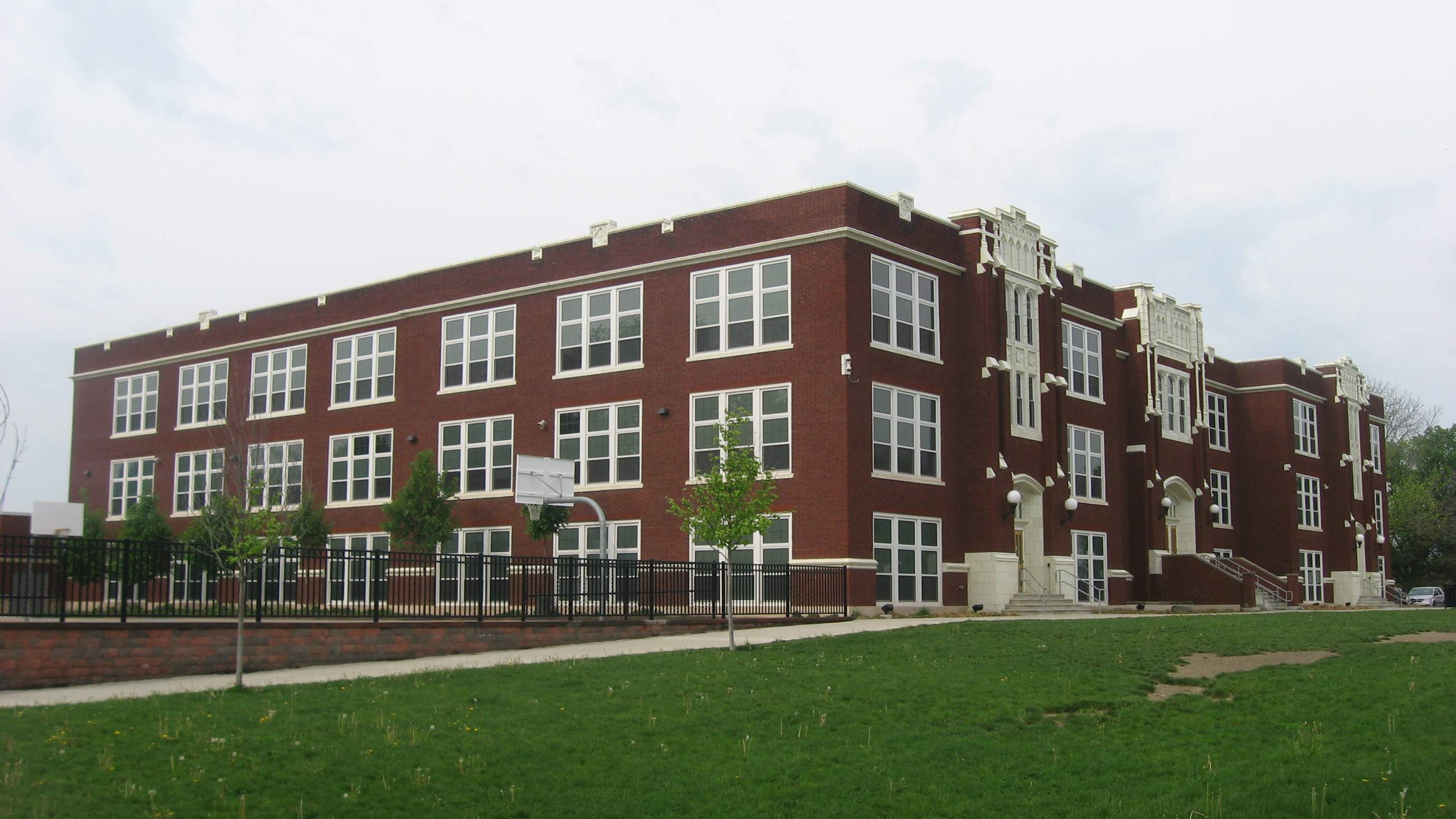
Bucyrus Elementary School

Bucyrus City School District is a public school district serving students in the city of Bucyrus, Ohio, United States. The school district enrolls 1,089 students as of the 2023 - 2024 academic year. The school sports teams, are called the Bucyrus Redmen.

== Schools ==
=== Elementary school ===
- Bucyrus Elementary School (Pre-k-5)

=== Middle school ===
- Bucyrus Secondary School (6-8)

=== High school ===
- Bucyrus High School (9-12)
