= Lauretta Schimmoler =

American aviator (1900–1981)

- Born: September 17, 1900; Fort Jennings, Ohio
- Died: January 1981 (aged 80); Glendale, California
- Education: Bliss Business College
- Known for: First woman in the United States to establish an airport in the United States, first woman to command an American Legion post, founder of the Aerial Nurse Corps of America
- Aviation career
- Flight license: September 8, 1930
- Rank: Post commander

Lauretta M. Schimmoler (September 17, 1900 – January 1981) was an aviator who was the first woman in the United States to establish an airport in the United States, the first woman to command an American Legion post and was the founder of the Aerial Nurse Corps of America the predecessor of the flight nurses of the United States Air Force.

== Biography ==
Schimmoler graduated from the Bliss Business College in Columbus, Ohio and began studies in law after working as a court stenographer. She left the study of law to become a secretary in a chicken hatchery in Bucyrus, Ohio that led her to become the owner of her own poultry business.

Her life changed when she witnessed a test flight in Dayton. She began an intensive study of flight through working various jobs with the United States Air Mail, Lockheed Aircraft where she studied the manufacture of aircraft and the US Weather Bureau earning a student pilot licence on August 10, 1929, and becoming the advertising manager of her flight school. She became the first woman to establish and maintain an airport with the founding of Port Bucyrus. She received her full pilot's licence on September 8, 1930.

In April 1931, in recognition of her works in aviation, she was elected to the board of the north-central section of the Ninety-Nines. She moved to Cleveland Airport in November 1932 to establish the headquarters of the organization, accepting a job as vice president of the Vi-Air-Ways flight school.

After witnessing the results of a tornado in Ohio in 1930, Schimmoler saw the necessity of evacuating medical patients by air and created what today is recognised as the forerunners of the flight nurse. In 1933 she formed the Emergency Flight Corps. In 1936 it was reformed as the Aerial Nurse Corps of America with 78 nurses.

Initially, both the American Red Cross and the United States Army Air Forces took a dim view of the Aerial Nurse Corps. However, during World War II a medical air ambulance evacuation squadron was formed in May 1942. During this time Shimmoler became the technical advisor to and played a role in the Columbia Pictures film Parachute Nurse that was released in August 1942.

The United States Army Air Forces changed their minds on flight nurses and on 30 November 1942 made an appeal for experienced female registered nurses and air hostesses to be flight nurses in the Army Nurse Corps to be assigned to air evacuation units.

In 1944 she, at last, was commissioned in the Women's Army Corps.

Schimmoler became the first post commander of the American Legion's Amelia Earhardt Post 127 of Glendale, California in 1946 that initially contained woman veterans.

In 1966 Schimmoler was recognised by the Surgeon General of the United States as the first flight nurse and by the United States Air Force who awarded her the gold wings of a flight nurse.

== Legacy ==
In 2011 the United States Air Force Association created a Schimmoler Award for excellence.
