= Aerial Nurse Corps of America =

The Aerial Nurse Corps of America abbreviated to ANCOA is regarded as the initiation of the Air Ambulance.

== History ==
=== The Beginning of the Air Ambulance ===
Before 1936, professional air transportation of critically ill patients did not exist in the United States. Medical air transport began sporadically during World War I, but they placed the wounded behind the pilot's area with no one to attend to them. After WWI, civilian pilots occasionally flew a patient when urgently needed but they were still unaccompanied by trained medical personnel—the pilot flew the plane with the patient alone on the floor in the back with no one to render care.

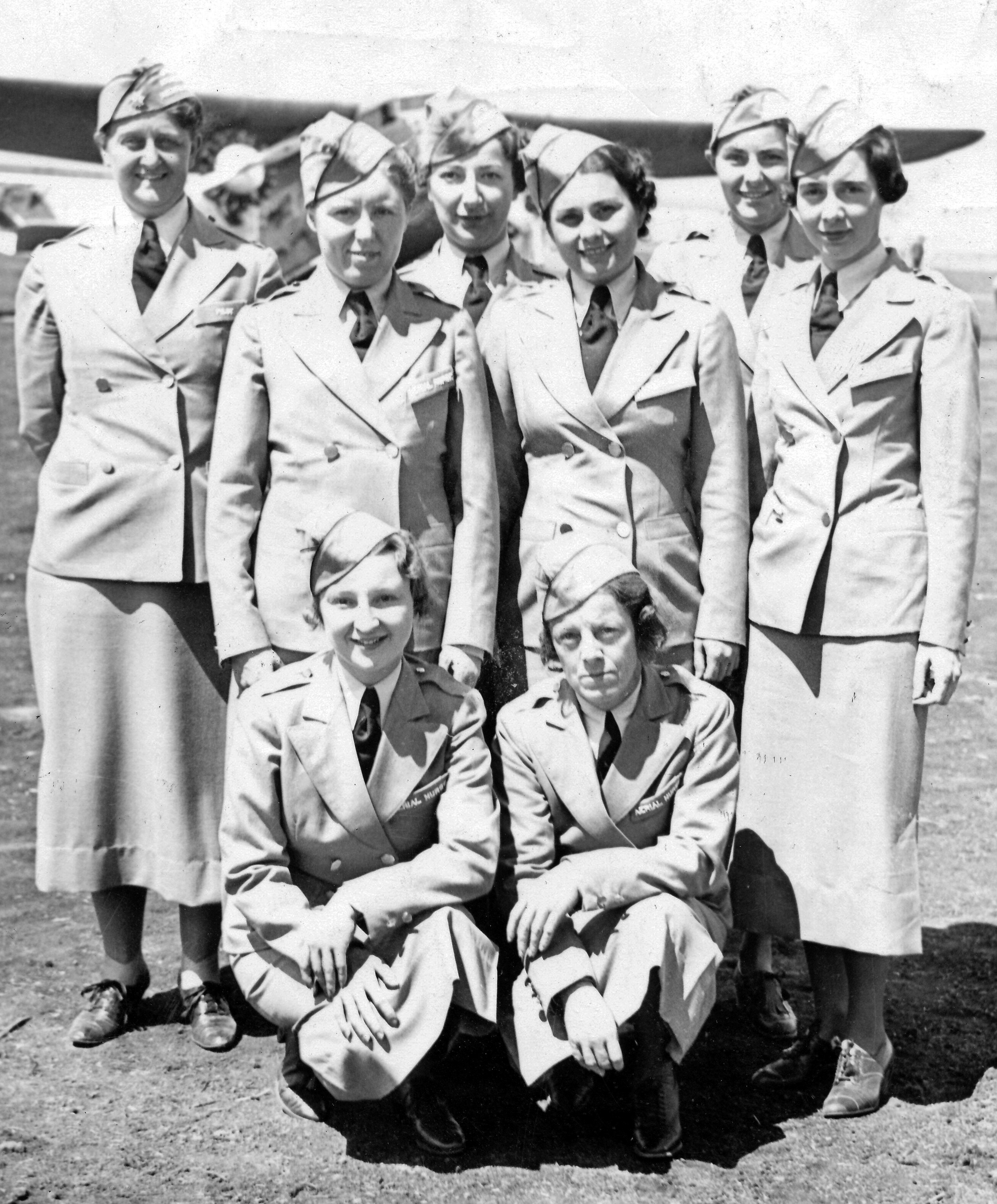
Aerial Nurse Corps of America, 1936

In 1930 in Bucyrus, Ohio, pilot Lauretta Schimmoler, had an epiphany while flying over a tornado-ravished community. "Gee! If nurses had been trained in aviation, they could have flown in and rendered aid so much more rapidly." She thought nurses trained in air transport would be valuable for society. She hoped it could also benefit the military. She met with a group of nurses in Cleveland, in 1932, and their enthusiasm for the idea made her switch from her profession as an airport manager and devote her time to developing the concept of training nurses for air ambulance flights. She called them Aerial Nurses and the first group the Emergency Flight Corps. She never developed that first Ohio group. Instead, she moved to Los Angeles and in 1936 changed the name and started the Aerial Nurse Corps of America with ten nurses.

=== The Aerial Nurse Corps of America is Formed ===
She found other nurses who believed in her cause, like the nurse-pilot Leora Stroup who championed the idea and started a group in Detroit, Michigan. Schimmoler and Stroup had met in 1933 as both of them were members of the Ninety-Nines, the female flyers that started a women's group of pilots in 1929 with Amelia Earhart as their president.

Eventually, the ANCOA's numbers grew to 25 companies and more than 600 members in 16 states. They established first aid tents at air shows, air races, or at any event where dangerous activities might require nurses to render first aid. One journal said, "Scarcely a first-rate event has been arranged without the assistance of the local Aerial Nurse Corps." They began transporting patients and by the end of 1937 Schimmoler said, "In California, my staff is called on for one to six trips each week to speed ailing persons to distant cities for medical and surgical treatment." They had sold the public on the idea that nurses should have specialized training for air ambulance duties, but Nursing Administration groups, the Red Cross, and the Military didn't agree. These groups didn't accept new ideas from outsiders and they scrutinized Schimmoler's actions because she wasn't a nurse—they didn't think a lay person should direct nurses' activities. Eventually the pressure from these groups made Schimmoler step-down from her role as President of the ANCOA; the ANCOA nurses didn't know if their group could survive with the interference from the various ranks but they reorganized and tried to continue.

=== The ANCOA Disbands ===
Shortly after Schimmoler stepped down from her role as President, WWII began and private planes were grounded. Many ANCOA nurses joined the military and the non-nurses in the group assisted the home defense war effort. With no planes and few nurses, the ANCOA eventually disbanded.

=== The Army Accepts Schimmoler's Idea ===
By 1942 the Army Air Force had fully accepted Schimmoler's idea that nurses needed specialized training for air transport of injured patients and they began to train Army Nurses as Flight Nurses for the Army Air Force (an independent Air Force did not yet exist). Leora Stroup became the first nurse to train Flight Nurses at Bowman Field in Louisville, Kentucky. Several other ANCOA nurses also joined the ranks of the first military Flight Nurses.

Since Schimmoler wasn't a nurse, she joined the WACs in 1944 as an Airplane Dispatcher and by serendipity witnessed the first landing of a giant C-54 containing wounded soldiers with their attending Flight Nurses. She was overcome with pride of the moment and said out loud, "And they said it wouldn't be done."

== Aeromedical Transport Today ==
As of 2024, over 300 air ambulances transport about 3% of all medical transports in the United States. And a flight nurse with certifications accompanies the patient.
