= Ohio Mutual Insurance Group =

Group of insurance companies

- Type: Mutual
- Industry: Insurance
- Headquarters: Bucyrus, Ohio, U.S.
- Key people: Mark C. Russell (President & CEO)
- Products: Property and casualty insurance
- Website: http://omig.com

Ohio Mutual Insurance Group is a group of property and casualty insurance companies based in Bucyrus, Ohio. The group is composed of three affiliates: Ohio Mutual Insurance Company, United Ohio Insurance Company and Casco Indemnity Company. As a mutual insurance company, Ohio Mutual Insurance Group is not a stock company but one that is mutually owned by its policyholders. A board of directors and an appointed president and chief executive officer manage the company.

The company offers automobile, homeowners, business, farm, property, liability, inland marine and commercial automobile insurance. The combined affiliates write more than $278 million in premiums each year. Its products are sold through nearly 400 independent insurance agent partners in seven states: Connecticut, Indiana, Maine, New Hampshire, Ohio, Rhode Island and Vermont.

Ohio Mutual Insurance Group is a member of the National Insurance Crime Bureau, a non-profit membership organization created by the insurance industry to address insurance-related crime.

== History ==
Ohio Mutual Insurance Group was founded in 1901 as the Ohio Mutual Tornado, Cyclone and Windstorm Company, offering insurance to farmers. It was incorporated in Columbus, Ohio and its first office was established in Bucyrus above what is now the FC Bank on Washington Square.

The company's second headquarters was built in 1941 across from the Crawford County Courthouse. In 1947, the company's name changed to Ohio Windstorm Insurance Corporation and again, in 1961, to Ohio Mutual Insurance Association.

The company was reorganized and the name changed to Ohio Mutual Insurance Company in 2000. The name Ohio Mutual Insurance Group was registered with the Ohio Secretary of State in 2007. The company moved to its current headquarters, located at 1725 Hopley Avenue, Bucyrus, Ohio, in 1969.

On January 1, 2011, Ohio Mutual Insurance Group completed the acquisition of Casco Indemnity Company located in Saco, Maine.

In January 2021, the company reorganized as a mutual holding company to offer mutual membership benefits to all of its policyholders.

== Company leadership ==
Mark C. Russell, CPCU (Chartered Property Casualty Underwriter), ARM (Associate in Risk Management) and CCLA (Casualty Claim Law Associate), is the company's president and chief executive officer, succeeding James J. Kennedy in August 2015. Kennedy had served in that capacity since 2003.

Russell is a past member of the National Insurance Crime Bureau's Board of Governors.

== Ratings and recognition ==
Ohio Mutual Insurance Group is rated by A.M. Best, a rating agency that focuses on insurance, as “A” (Excellent) with a “Stable” outlook as of its June 24, 2016 financial strength rating. The “A” rating has been held since 1993.

From 2009 through 2013, and again in 2019–2021, Aon Ward Group, an operational consulting firm that provides benchmarking and best practice recognition for the insurance industry, listed Ohio Mutual Insurance Group as one of the nation's top 50 property-casualty insurers.
