= Colonel Crawford Local School District =

School district in Ohio

Colonel Crawford Local School District is a public school district serving students in Crawford County, Ohio located in and around North Robinson, Ohio. The school district enrolls 987 students as of the 2008–2009 academic year. The district is named for Colonel William Crawford.

== Schools ==
=== Elementary schools ===
- Hannah Crawford Elementary School

Principal: Mrs. Jennifer Sautter (PreK through 5)

=== Middle schools ===
- William Crawford Intermediate School

Principal: Mrs. April Bond (6 through 8)

=== High schools ===
- Colonel Crawford High School

Principal: Mr. Jacob Bruner (9 through 12)
