= Howard Atlee =

American press agent, publicist, dog breeder and handler (1926–2024)

- Born: May 14, 1926; Bucyrus, Ohio, U.S.
- Died: March 15, 2024 (aged 97)
- Occupation(s): Press agent, publicist, dog breeder, dog handler

Howard Atlee (May 14, 1926 – March 15, 2024) was an American press agent, publicist, dog breeder and handler.

Born in Bucyrus, Ohio on May 14, 1926, Atlee served in the United States Navy before he worked as a publicist and agent. An account stated that his interest in Broadway Theatre began after he attended a professionally staged production while stationed in the Navy in Boston. His work as a publicist helped launch the career of Edward Albee through his involvement in the promotion of the latter's play, Who's Afraid of Virginia Woolf?, in 1962. Atlee also became an actor.

Atlee died on March 15, 2024, at the age of 97.
