= The Richest Man in Town =

1941 film directed by Charles Barton

- Theatrical poster for the film
- Directed by: Charles Barton
- Screenplay by: Fanya Foss; Jerry Sackheim
- Story by: Jerry Sackheim
- Produced by: Jack Fier
- Starring: Frank Craven; Edgar Buchanan; Eileen O'Hearn
- Cinematography: Philip Tannura
- Edited by: Al Clark
- Music by: M. W. Stoloff
- Production company: Columbia Pictures
- Distributed by: Columbia Pictures
- Release date: June 12, 1941 (US)
- Running time: 70 minutes
- Country: United States
- Language: English

The Richest Man in Town is a 1941 American comedy film directed by Charles Barton and starring Frank Craven, Edgar Buchanan and Roger Pryor. It was produced and distributed by Columbia Pictures.

== Plot ==
In a small town bank manager Abb Crothers and newspaper owner Pete Martin have a friendly feud stretching back many years. However Martin goes too far when he published an obituary of the still alive Crothers.

== Cast ==
- Frank Craven as Abb Crothers
- Edgar Buchanan as Pete Martin
- Eileen O'Hearn as Mary Martin
- Roger Pryor as Tom Manning
- Tom Dugan as Jack Leslie
- George McKay as Jerry Ross
- Jimmy Dodd as Bill
- Jan Duggan as Penelope Kidwell
- John Tyrrell as Ozzie Williams
- Harry Tyler as Cliff Smithers
- Will Wright as Frederick Johnson
- Joel Friedkin as Ed Gunther
- Erville Alderson as Jenkins
- Thomas W. Ross as Dr. Dickenson
- Eddie Earle as Berton
- Ferris Taylor as Perkins
- George Guhl as Sheriff
- Netta Packer as Miss Andrews
- William Gould as Thorpe
- Kathryn Sheldon as Martha

== Bibliography ==
- Fetrow, Alan G. Feature Films, 1940-1949: a United States Filmography. McFarland, 1994.
