= Harry L. Martin =

US Marine officer and Medal of Honor recipient (1911–1945)

Harry Linn Martin
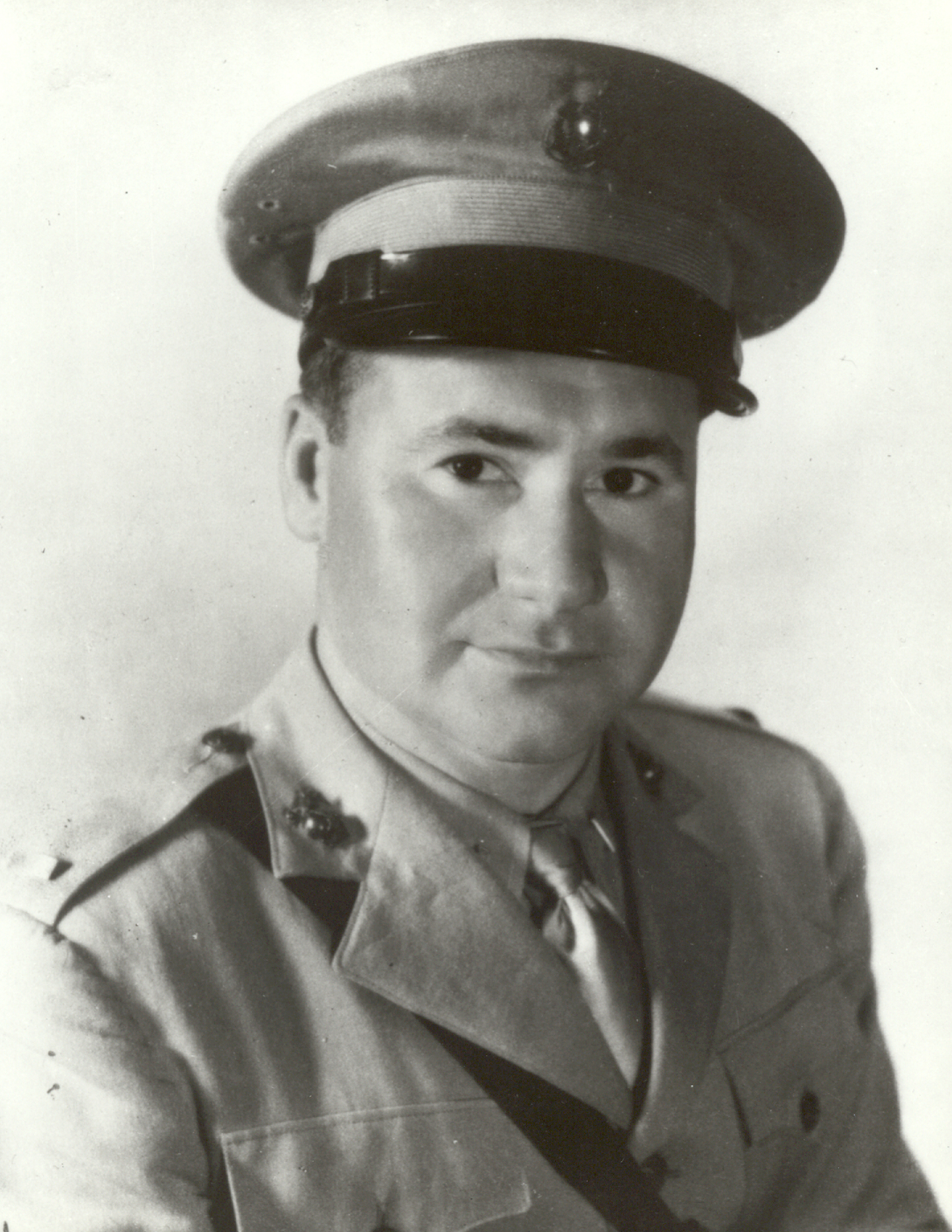
- Born: January 4, 1911; Bucyrus, Ohio
- Died: March 26, 1945 (aged 34); Iwo Jima, Volcano Islands, Japanese Empire
- Burial place: initially the 5th Division Cemetery at Iwo Jima later moved to Oakwood Cemetery, Bucyrus, Ohio
- Military career
- Allegiance: United States of America
- Branch: United States Marine Corps
- Service years: 1943–1945
- Rank: First Lieutenant
- Units: Company C, 5th Pioneer Battalion, 5th Marine Division
- Conflicts: World War II; Pacific War; Japan campaign; Volcano and Ryukyu Islands campaign; Battle of Iwo Jima †
- Awards: Medal of Honor; Purple Heart

First Lieutenant Harry Linn Martin (January 4, 1911 – March 26, 1945) was a United States Marine Corps officer who posthumously received the Medal of Honor for his actions on Iwo Jima on March 26, 1945.

== Biography ==
Harry Linn Martin was a member of the Ohio National Guard and graduated from Bucyrus High School and from Michigan State College in East Lansing, Michigan, where he majored in business administration. At State, he was on the football and wrestling teams and did some boxing and skiing. He was a member of the Sigma Alpha fraternity and served two years in the Cavalry unit of the ROTC. Following graduation in 1936, he worked in Honolulu, Hawaii as an office manager for the Hawaiian Construction Tunnel Company.

On August 25, 1943, he was commissioned a second lieutenant in the Marine Corps Reserve. Following schooling at Quantico, Virginia, 2nd Lt. Martin completed the Engineers School at New River, North Carolina, and was designated an Engineer Officer on March 13, 1944. Assigned to 2nd Battalion, 16th Marines, an engineer regiment of the 5th Marine Division, he joined Company C when the designation of the battalion was changed to 5th Pioneer Battalion.

Second Lieutenant Martin went overseas with his unit in the summer of 1944 and went into training in Hawaii. On February 19, 1945, he landed on Iwo Jima in the Volcano Islands and before the day ended, he had already sustained a slight wound. He was promoted to first lieutenant on March 1, 1945, twenty-five days before his death.

A few minutes before dawn on the morning of March 26, the day the Iwo campaign officially closed, the Japanese launched a concentrated attack and penetrated the Marine lines in the area where 1st Lt. Martin's platoon was bivouacked. He immediately organized a firing line among the men in the foxholes closest to his own, and temporarily stopped the headlong rush of the enemy. Several of his men were lying wounded in positions overrun by the enemy, and the lieutenant was determined to rescue them. In the action that followed, he was severely wounded twice but continued to resist the enemy until he fell mortally wounded by a grenade.

The Medal of Honor and citation were presented to his parents by Secretary of the Navy James Forrestal at a ceremony in the Navy Department on May 6, 1946.

First Lieutenant Martin was buried in the 5th Division Cemetery at Iwo Jima. At the request of his mother, his remains were returned to Ohio in 1948 for private burial in Oakwood Cemetery in Bucyrus, Ohio.

== Medal of Honor citation ==
The President of the United States takes pride in presenting the MEDAL OF HONOR posthumously to

FIRST LIEUTENANT HARRY L. MARTIN
UNITED STATES MARINE CORPS RESERVE

for service as outlined in the following CITATION:

For conspicuous gallantry and intrepidity at the risk of his life above and beyond the call of duty as Platoon Leader attached to Company C, Fifth Pioneer Battalion, Fifth Marine Division, in action against enemy Japanese forces on Iwo Jima, Volcano Islands, 26 March 1945. With his sector of the Fifth Pioneer Battalion bivouac area penetrated by a concentrated enemy attack launched a few minutes before dawn, First Lieutenant Martin instantly organized a firing line with the Marines nearest his foxhole and succeeded, in checking momentarily the headlong rush of the Japanese. Determined to rescue several of his men trapped in positions overrun by the enemy, he defied intense hostile fire to work his way through the Japanese to the surrounded Marines. Although sustaining two severe wounds, he blasted the Japanese who attempted to intercept him, located his beleaguered men and directed them to their own lines. When four of the infiltrating enemy took possession of an abandoned machine-gun pit and subjected his sector to a barrage of hand grenades, First Lieutenant Martin alone and armed only with a pistol, boldly charged the hostile position and killed all its occupants. Realizing that his remaining comrades could not repulse another organized attack, he called to his men to follow and then charged into the midst of the strong enemy force, firing his weapon and scattering them until he fell, mortally wounded by a grenade. By his outstanding valor, indomitable fighting spirit and tenacious determination in the face of overwhelming odds, First Lieutenant Martin permanently disrupted a coordinated Japanese attack and prevented a greater loss of life in his own and adjacent platoons and his inspiring leadership and unswerving devotion to duty reflect the highest credit upon himself and the United States Naval Service. He gallantly gave his life in service of his country.

/S/ HARRY S. TRUMAN

== Awards and decorations ==

1st row	Medal of Honor	Purple Heart	Combat Action Ribbon
2nd row	American Campaign Medal	Asiatic-Pacific Campaign Medal one Campaign star	World War II Victory Medal

== Honors ==
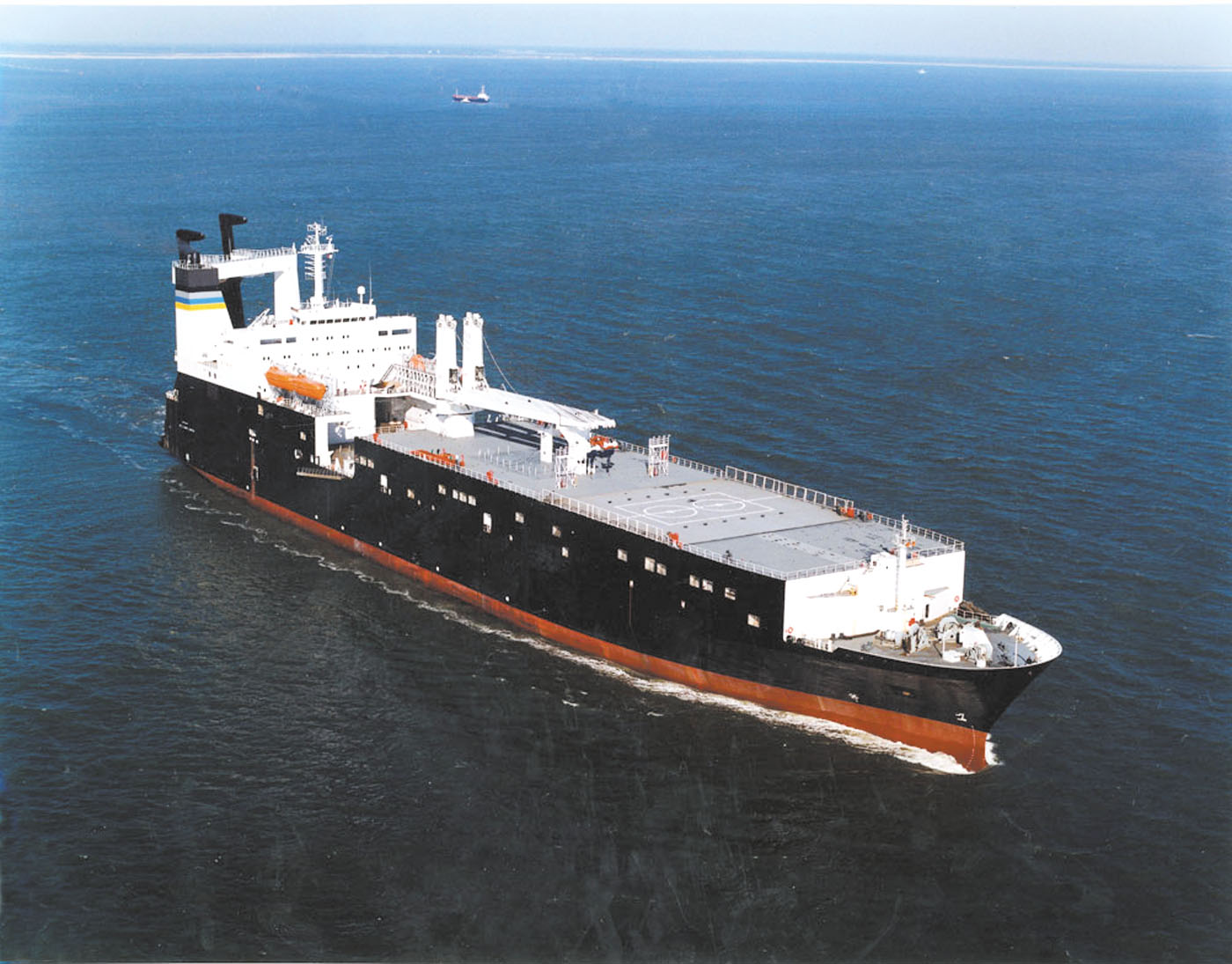
USNS 1st Lt. Harry L. Martin

The United States Navy Maritime prepositioning ship USNS 1st Lt. Harry L. Martin (T-AK-3015) was named in his honor.

== See also ==
- List of Medal of Honor recipients for World War II
- List of Medal of Honor recipients for the Battle of Iwo Jima
