= 2025 Las Vegas Cybertruck explosion =

New Year's Day incident in Nevada, U.S.

- CCTV footage of the truck explosion
- Location: 36°07′45″N 115°10′21″W; Outside the Trump International Hotel Las Vegas, Paradise, Nevada, U.S.
- Date: January 1, 2025; 21 months ago 8:39 a.m. (PST)
- Attack type: Truck bomb
- Weapons: Fireworks and gas canisters; .50-caliber Desert Eagle (used in suicide); .308 SLR B30 pistol (unused)
- Deaths: 1 (the perpetrator, by gunfire)
- Injuries: 7
- Perpetrator: Matthew Livelsberger
- Motive: Under investigation; possible domestic terrorism

On January 1, 2025, at approximately 8:39 a.m. (PST), an improvised explosive device exploded in a Tesla Cybertruck parked outside the main entrance of the Trump International Hotel Las Vegas in Paradise, Nevada, United States. The vehicle's sole occupant died from a self-inflicted gunshot wound to the head immediately prior to the explosion and seven bystanders were injured by the blast. Authorities found that the vehicle contained firework mortars and gas canisters, which had fueled the explosion and fire.

Authorities identified the driver and alleged perpetrator as 37-year-old Matthew Alan Livelsberger, an American-born, active-duty United States Army Special Forces soldier from Colorado Springs, Colorado, who was on leave from overseas duty.

Livelsberger wrote two digital letters in which he said he was using explosives to convey a political message and ease his mental burdens. Livelsberger also sent an email manifesto stating he was under surveillance due to his knowledge of advanced military technologies and covert operations, including an alleged cover-up of war crimes. The manifesto narrative, which detailed plans to escape across the Mexico border, showed no suicidal intent and conflicts with the two digital letters apparently authored earlier that month.

The truck explosion was one of two vehicular attacks that occurred in the United States on the first day of 2025, the other being the New Orleans truck attack hours earlier. Authorities consider the two unrelated.

== Incident ==
At approximately 7:30 a.m. PST, the truck arrived in Las Vegas. The truck had been rented in Colorado using Turo, a peer-to-peer carsharing service, and authorities suspect it had been fitted with a detonation system composed of fireworks, gas tanks, and camping fuel. At 8:39 a.m., the driver parked the truck in the porte cochère of Trump International Hotel Las Vegas where it exploded and caught fire. The first reports of a fire were received two minutes later. First responders arrived within four minutes and extinguished the fire within an hour. The vehicle had been functioning properly, according to Tesla CEO Elon Musk. The explosion caused limited damage to the vehicle and did not break the glass doors of the hotel's lobby entrance. The hotel was evacuated, with most of the guests moved to different locations.

== Victims ==
Seven bystanders suffered minor injuries. Two of them were taken to the University Medical Center of Southern Nevada. All seven people were reported to be in stable condition.

== Perpetrator ==
While sitting in the driver seat of the vehicle, the only occupant fatally shot himself in the head before the explosion. The gun was recovered near his feet after the blast. He was identified by the Federal Bureau of Investigation (FBI) as Matthew Alan Livelsberger (July 22, 1987 – January 1, 2025), 37, from Colorado Springs, Colorado, an active-duty United States Army Special Forces soldier since January 2006 who was on approved leave. Although his body was "burned beyond recognition", authorities suspected his identity before confirmations from medical records. His vehicle also contained a rifle along with two pistols.

=== Background ===
Livelsberger was born in Arizona, raised in Bucyrus, Ohio, and was a student at Bucyrus High School until 2005. He had ties to several other Ohio towns, including Ontario, Westerville, and Cuyahoga Falls. He was in the Army for 19 years, deploying to several countries, including Afghanistan, Ukraine, the Republic of the Congo, Tajikistan, and Georgia, receiving several commendations for his service. Livelsberger had been heralded in January 2010 for collecting donations for children in Afghanistan in May 2009, and was later awarded two Bronze Stars, including one with a valor device for courage under fire, a Combat Infantryman Badge and an Army Commendation Medal with valor. Nicknamed "Berg" by his colleagues, he was eventually ranked as a master sergeant and worked in multiple roles within the 10th Special Forces Group such as communications specialist, intelligence specialist, and senior leader of an Operational Detachment Alpha ("ODA or A-Team"). He graduated summa cum laude from Norwich University with a degree in Strategic Studies and Defense Analysis.

Livelsberger and his first wife divorced in 2018. Neighbors described him as being normal, quiet, and polite. An ex-girlfriend who was a nurse who served military veterans and dated Livelsberger 'on and off from 2018 to 2021' said that he identified as "politically moderate" but leaning conservative, "incredibly intelligent," and "never mean." She also stated that they broke up because he was not interested in being a stepfather and wanted to continue committing to his career. His military tour in the Middle East resulted in his untreated symptoms of depression that by 2019 led to behavioral changes including isolation; he did not seek treatment due to stigma against Special Forces soldiers seeking such. He was raising an 8-month old daughter and, according to his father, seemed normal when they last spoke on Christmas Day. He was previously placed in a new assignment involving drones that his friends said excited him. He was last posted in Germany to work as a systems manager for the US Army but was on leave in Colorado; according to his second wife, he had disappeared for several days before his death. Several addresses in the Colorado Springs area were associated with Livelsberger's name. He and his wife broke up just six days before the truck explosion due to an argument regarding adultery. He rented the vehicle on December 28 in Denver, Colorado. The ex-girlfriend described text messages that he had sent her in the days just before the incident, praising his rented truck and expressing his enthusiasm about building drones in his new military assignment. The same woman stated that he felt things "very deeply and [she] could see him using symbolism" regarding those associated with the hotel and the truck and that since "he wasn't impulsive" she suspected that "he was probably thinking it out".

== Manifesto ==
Livelsberger authored a manifesto sent via email to Samuel Shoemate, a retired Army intelligence officer. The manifesto, which officials believe to be authentic, contained claims of clandestine operations, war crimes, and advanced military technologies. In the manifesto, Livelsberger said that he was under surveillance by intelligence agencies due to his knowledge of war crimes and classified details about an advanced U.S. drone program. He stated that he planned to escape across the Mexico border but feared U.S. intelligence agents would stop him, noting he was armed and in possession of a vehicle-borne IED (VBIED, or car bomb) and expressed no suicidal intent. Livelsberger instructed Shoemate to release the email after January 1, 2025, and requested anonymity until that date.

Additionally, a Drug Enforcement Administration (DEA) official was named in the manifesto as being involved in the war crimes cover-up, but the name was redacted due to their active duty status. Livelsberger concluded his email by urging the media to publicize the allegations to prevent escalating geopolitical tensions and potential global conflict. He cited his military background, including active duty status and a Top Secret/Sensitive Compartmented Information (TS/SCI) clearance, to substantiate his claims.

The manifesto was first revealed on the Shawn Ryan Show podcast on January 3, 2025, hosted by Shawn Ryan, a retired United States Navy SEAL, before being sent to the FBI. Shoemate said that Livelsberger's Signal safety number changed posthumously, raising concerns that someone had gained access to his account following his apparent death.

=== Gravitic propulsion systems ===
The manifesto alleged that "gravitic propulsion systems" were operationally deployed by both the United States and China. Livelsberger claimed Chinese submarines launched unmanned aircraft along the Atlantic coast as part of a broader intelligence and surveillance strategy, in reference to the 2024 United States drone sightings. He further warned that such technologies, with their stealth and unlimited payload capacity, represented an unparalleled threat to national security, potentially enabling attacks on critical infrastructure like the White House.

=== 2019 Nimruz Province airstrikes ===
In addition, Livelsberger accused U.S. government agencies, including the CIA, DEA, and Department of Defense, of covering up war crimes during airstrikes in Nimruz Province, Afghanistan, in 2019. He alleged that over 65 buildings were targeted, resulting in hundreds of civilian deaths despite prior knowledge of civilian presence. Livelsberger claimed he participated in the cover-up while working with senior U.S. military and intelligence officials. These airstrikes were investigated by the Office of the United Nations High Commissioner for Human Rights (OHCHR) which released a report in October 2019.

The United Nations report states that while United States Forces – Afghanistan (USFOR-A) claims there were no civilian casualties, on 5 May 2019, airstrikes targeted over 60 drug production sites, resulting in 39 verified civilian casualties, including 30 deaths—among them, 14 children and one woman. Of these verified casualties, only 17 were reportedly working in the drug laboratories. In addition, the report states that UNAMA has "reliable and credible information to substantiate" at least 37 additional civilian casualties, including 30 deaths, mostly women and children, and is working to further verify these figures.

The UN stressed that these facilities should be considered civilian targets under international humanitarian law, in contrast to long-standing US policy that treats such facilities as legitimate military targets. The report made a number of recommendations, including that illicit drug activity be addressed through law enforcement rather than military operations. USFOR-A disputes the claims, asserting that Taliban-linked drug laboratories were legitimate military targets under U.S. rules of engagement.

=== Manifesto classified by Department of Defense ===
The Las Vegas Metropolitan Police Department confirmed that on January 9, 2025, the United States Department of Defense took command of the investigation and declared the manifesto classified, which was reported by KVVU-TV.

== Investigation ==
The Federal Bureau of Investigation (FBI) and the United States Army Criminal Investigation Division (DACID) began investigating the explosion the same day. The incident was investigated as a possible terrorist attack. The Las Vegas Metropolitan Police Department reported that Livelsberger used ChatGPT to help plan the explosion. President Joe Biden was briefed on the event. Investigators initially explored any possible connection with the New Orleans truck attack that occurred hours earlier and in which the same car-sharing application was used, though the FBI later reported that there was no definitive link between the two attacks. Tesla independently investigated the incident. Investigators initially kept in mind the fact that Livelsberger used a Tesla vehicle to attack a Trump building but sought to avoid immediately synthesizing political motives.

Livelsberger's uncle told The Independent that he thought the truck had exploded due to a mechanical fault, and was therefore surprised when contacted and informed of his nephew's involvement. He said his nephew served in the Special Forces because he was very patriotic toward his country, and that Livelsberger was a talented "supersoldier" who was skilled with explosives and could have used better explosives than "propane tanks and camping fuel". Similarly, an anonymous close relative of Matthew Livelsberger identified him as always having wanted to be an "Army soldier, in Special Forces, even as a little kid. And when he achieved that, he was a soldier's soldier."

Despite feelings of relief by local and federal authorities due to the low death toll and property damage, the circumstances behind the incident caused "a lot of head-scratching" from the authorities along with Livelsberger's Special Forces colleagues. Several Special Forces soldiers speculated that given their training, he could have inflicted much more harm by constructing the bomb differently, if that had been his intention. Although he did not formally hold any explosives positions, he would have been trained on using and building explosives as an A-Team member, especially as a senior leader with combat experience. Electric vehicle experts interviewed by The Washington Post noted that the materials detonated within the truck were enough to cause a significant amount of heat and fire, but appeared to have only resulted in a "low-grade" explosion, causing only limited damage to the vehicle and its surroundings.

Spencer L. Evans, the FBI agent in charge of the investigation, said that it appeared Livelsberger suffered from post-traumatic stress disorder (PTSD), with family or personal issues having potentially contributed to his actions. The investigation determined that he detonated "a combination of fireworks, gas tanks and camping fuel in the bed of the vehicle" using a device and kept track of the items that he purchased in a 10-day journal log from December 21 to 31, 2024. Fran Racioppi, a podcaster and former Special Forces officer, suggested that it could have been a "botched" act of terrorism but also highlighted the event as part of a broader trend of mental health problems that Special Forces veterans experience due to their high risk of traumatic brain injuries. Livelsberger confided to his ex-girlfriend that he had suffered a traumatic brain injury during his deployment, leading to memory issues, difficulty concentrating, strained relationships, and guilt over his battlefield actions. She recognized these as symptoms of head or body trauma, which can lead to mental health deterioration and noted that similar injuries had tragically resulted in suicide for several veterans she knew.

=== Letters ===
Investigators were able to access one of two phones belonging to Livelsberger that were found in the vehicle and view two letters in an app that detailed his motive for the bombing. In his first letter, he told "fellow service members, veterans and all Americans" to "wake up" at the "weak" government and that "we are being led by weak and feckless leaders who only serve to enrich themselves". He recommended that military members and veterans be prepared to potentially get Democratic Party members out of the federal government and military. He first recommended peaceful methods but then suggested that they "fight" if necessary to achieve their goals. In his second, he denied the bombing being a "terrorist attack" but instead a "wake up call" towards a collapsing United States, that he felt that a "stunt with fireworks and explosives" was the best way to do so since Americans "only pay attention to spectacles and violence." He finally admitted to wanting to "cleanse [his] mind of the brothers" that he lost and "relieve [himself] of the burden of the lives [he] took."

He criticized both increased income inequality (specifically from the "top 1%") and diversity, equity, and inclusion (DEI) efforts. He expressed his fears with the United States' rival nations like Russia, China, North Korea, and Iran and recommended that the nation embrace strength and masculinity and end the Russo-Ukrainian War by "negotiated settlement". He additionally criticized Kamala Harris as a "DEI candidate", expressing pleasure that the United States elected "a real president instead of Weekend at Bernie's." He argued that people should unite around Donald Trump, Elon Musk, and Robert F. Kennedy Jr. to promote national hegemony.

=== After-Action report by LVMPD ===
The Las Vegas Metropolitan Police Department released a report on the explosion and its investigation in November 2025.

=== Federal control of investigation ===
The US Government and DOD took command of the investigation from Las Vegas police in January, 2025.

== See also ==
- Orbit Inn bombing, a suicide bombing in Las Vegas that took place in 1967
- 2025 Palm Springs fertility clinic bombing, a suicide bombing in Palm Springs, California that took place later the same year
