= Bucyrus, Ohio =

- City
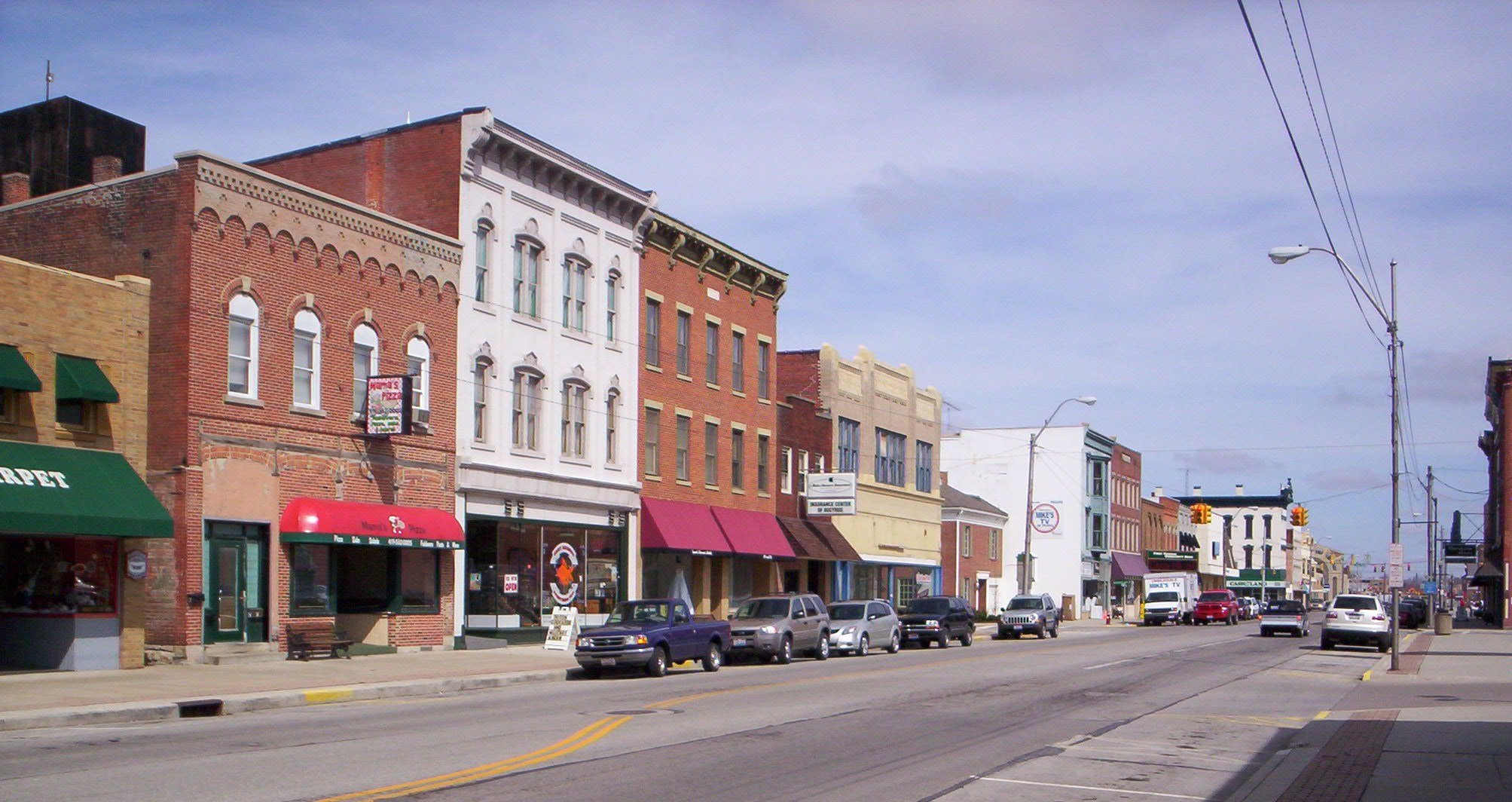
- Downtown Bucyrus on South Sandusky Avenue
- Motto: "The Small City in the Middle of Everywhere"
- Interactive map of Bucyrus, Ohio
- Location within Ohio Location within the United States
- Coordinates: 40°48′12″N 82°59′43″W
- Country: United States
- State: Ohio
- County: Crawford
- Townships: Bucyrus, Holmes, Liberty, Whetstone
- Founded: 1821

Government
  - Mayor: Bruce Truka

Area
  - Total: 7.41 sq mi (19.18 km^{2})
  - Land: 7.39 sq mi (19.14 km^{2})
  - Water: 0.015 sq mi (0.04 km^{2})
- Elevation: 1,001 ft (305 m)

Population (2020)
  - Total: 11,684
  - Estimate (2023): 11,542
  - Density: 1,581.1/sq mi (610.46/km^{2})
- Time zone: UTC-5 (Eastern (EST))
  - Summer (DST): UTC-4 (EDT)
- ZIP Code: 44820
- Area codes: 419, 567
- FIPS code: 39-10030
- GNIS feature ID: 2393452
- Website: www.cityofbucyrusoh.us

Bucyrus (/bjuːˈsaɪrəs/ bew-SY-rəs) is a city in Crawford County, Ohio, United States, and its county seat. It is located in northern Ohio approximately 28 miles (45 km) west of Mansfield and 66 miles (106 km) southeast of Toledo. The population was 11,684 at the 2020 census. The city is the largest in Crawford County and the center of the Bucyrus micropolitan statistical area.

== History ==
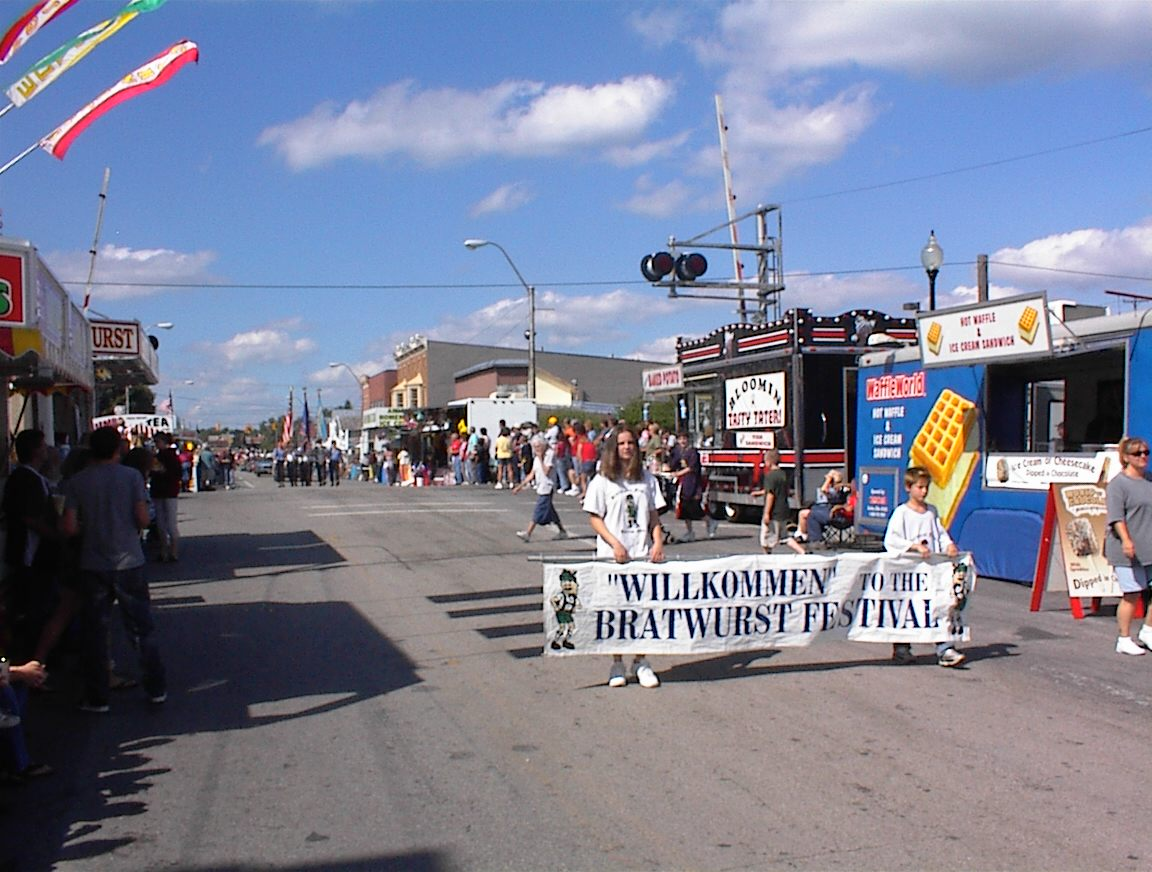
2004 Bratwurst Festival Parade

The origin of the name Bucyrus is not certain. It was given by James Kilbourne, who laid out the town in 1821. One theory is that the name Bucyrus is derived from "beautiful" coupled with the name of Cyrus the Great, founder of the First Persian Empire. An alternate theory is that the city was named after Busiris, a city of ancient Egypt.

The Bucyrus Foundry and Manufacturing Company, a predecessor to Bucyrus International, Inc. was founded in Bucyrus in 1880. The company moved to Wisconsin in 1893.

Bucyrus was once home to the Dostal Brothers Brewery. Founded in 1902, the brewery was run by John M. and George A. Dostal.

The Lincoln Highway, later US Route 30, was routed through the city along Mansfield Street in 1913. In 1971 a modern, limited-access bypass was built to the north, but the associated freeway links to the east and west of Bucyrus, replacing the old two-lane Lincoln Highway route, were not completed until 2005, nearly 35 years after they were first proposed.

Ohio Central Traction Company, an interurban line that connected the two communities of Bucyrus and Galion, developed Seccaium Park at the end of the nineteenth century.

There was a notable landmark of an Elephant with a "B" atop the Geiger Clothing store (since demolished) on Washington Square. This was to promote Geiger's motto which was, "Buy your clothing here, for it will last like the hide of an elephant."

Flooded street in Bucyrus, Ohio with horses, carriages, and people, 1913

On March 10, 2007, Bucyrus was featured as the town of the week on the nationally syndicated Public Radio International program, Whad'Ya Know?.

== Geography ==
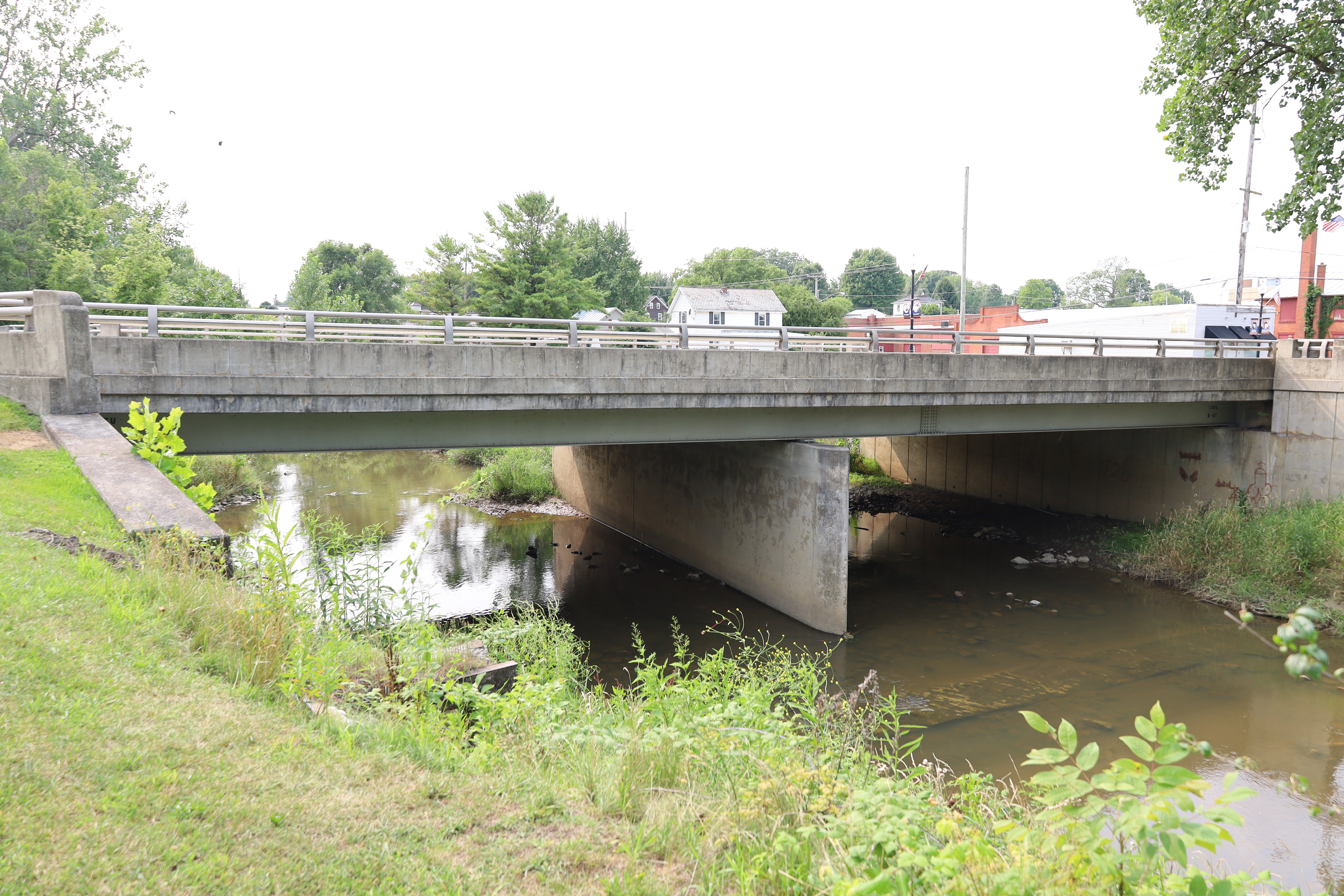
Sandusky Avenue crossing of the Sandusky River, carrying Ohio State Routes 4, 14, 98, and 100

Bucyrus is located at 40°48′22″N 82°58′23″W (40.806014, -82.973169), along the Sandusky River. According to the United States Census Bureau, the city has a total area of 7.43 square miles (19.24 km^{2}), of which 7.42 square miles (19.22 km^{2}) is land and 0.01 square miles (0.03 km^{2}) is water.

=== Climate ===
Climate data for Bucyrus, Ohio, 1991–2020 normals, extremes 1893–present
Month	Jan	Feb	Mar	Apr	May	Jun	Jul	Aug	Sep	Oct	Nov	Dec	Year
Record high °F (°C)	76 (24)	74 (23)	83 (28)	90 (32)	99 (37)	102 (39)	105 (41)	111 (44)	100 (38)	90 (32)	80 (27)	72 (22)	111 (44)
Mean maximum °F (°C)	57.0 (13.9)	59.0 (15.0)	69.5 (20.8)	80.4 (26.9)	87.4 (30.8)	92.7 (33.7)	92.5 (33.6)	91.1 (32.8)	89.2 (31.8)	80.9 (27.2)	68.3 (20.2)	59.2 (15.1)	93.9 (34.4)
Mean daily maximum °F (°C)	35.3 (1.8)	38.1 (3.4)	48.6 (9.2)	62.5 (16.9)	73.6 (23.1)	82.3 (27.9)	85.6 (29.8)	83.9 (28.8)	78.0 (25.6)	65.2 (18.4)	51.4 (10.8)	40.2 (4.6)	62.1 (16.7)
Daily mean °F (°C)	27.9 (−2.3)	30.0 (−1.1)	39.3 (4.1)	51.2 (10.7)	62.3 (16.8)	71.5 (21.9)	74.8 (23.8)	73.1 (22.8)	66.7 (19.3)	54.7 (12.6)	42.9 (6.1)	33.3 (0.7)	52.3 (11.3)
Mean daily minimum °F (°C)	20.5 (−6.4)	22.0 (−5.6)	29.9 (−1.2)	40.0 (4.4)	51.1 (10.6)	60.7 (15.9)	64.1 (17.8)	62.3 (16.8)	55.3 (12.9)	44.3 (6.8)	34.4 (1.3)	26.5 (−3.1)	42.6 (5.9)
Mean minimum °F (°C)	−3.2 (−19.6)	1.4 (−17.0)	10.7 (−11.8)	24.3 (−4.3)	35.3 (1.8)	44.4 (6.9)	51.6 (10.9)	49.8 (9.9)	40.0 (4.4)	28.8 (−1.8)	18.5 (−7.5)	6.8 (−14.0)	−5.4 (−20.8)
Record low °F (°C)	−26 (−32)	−28 (−33)	−16 (−27)	10 (−12)	25 (−4)	32 (0)	37 (3)	33 (1)	25 (−4)	12 (−11)	−8 (−22)	−19 (−28)	−28 (−33)
Average precipitation inches (mm)	2.75 (70)	2.13 (54)	2.52 (64)	3.54 (90)	3.99 (101)	4.45 (113)	4.15 (105)	3.26 (83)	3.36 (85)	2.86 (73)	2.87 (73)	2.64 (67)	38.52 (978)
Average snowfall inches (cm)	7.5 (19)	5.3 (13)	2.8 (7.1)	0.6 (1.5)	0.0 (0.0)	0.0 (0.0)	0.0 (0.0)	0.0 (0.0)	0.0 (0.0)	0.0 (0.0)	1.0 (2.5)	6.1 (15)	23.3 (58.1)
Average extreme snow depth inches (cm)	5.2 (13)	4.5 (11)	2.2 (5.6)	0.3 (0.76)	0.0 (0.0)	0.0 (0.0)	0.0 (0.0)	0.0 (0.0)	0.0 (0.0)	0.0 (0.0)	0.5 (1.3)	2.9 (7.4)	7.1 (18)
Average precipitation days (≥ 0.01 in)	13.8	11.5	11.6	12.9	13.4	11.3	10.8	8.7	10.0	9.9	9.9	12.5	136.3
Average snowy days (≥ 0.1 in)	7.9	5.1	2.4	0.6	0.0	0.0	0.0	0.0	0.0	0.0	1.1	5.0	22.1
Source 1: NOAA
Source 2: National Weather Service

== Demographics ==
Historical population
Census	Pop.	Note	%±
1830	308		—
1840	1,634		430.5%
1850	2,315		41.7%
1860	2,180		−5.8%
1870	3,066		40.6%
1880	3,835		25.1%
1890	5,974		55.8%
1900	6,569		10.0%
1910	8,122		23.6%
1920	10,425		28.4%
1930	10,027		−3.8%
1940	9,727		−3.0%
1950	10,327		6.2%
1960	12,276		18.9%
1970	13,111		6.8%
1980	13,413		2.3%
1990	13,496		0.6%
2000	13,224		−2.0%
2010	12,362		−6.5%
2020	11,684		−5.5%
2023 (est.)	11,542		−1.2%
U.S. Decennial Census

=== 2020 census ===
As of the 2020 census, Bucyrus had a population of 11,684. The median age was 43.9 years. 20.7% of residents were under the age of 18 and 22.5% of residents were 65 years of age or older. For every 100 females there were 93.4 males, and for every 100 females age 18 and over there were 90.8 males age 18 and over.

99.5% of residents lived in urban areas, while 0.5% lived in rural areas.

There were 5,239 households in Bucyrus, of which 25.0% had children under the age of 18 living in them. Of all households, 36.6% were married-couple households, 21.2% were households with a male householder and no spouse or partner present, and 32.4% were households with a female householder and no spouse or partner present. About 37.4% of all households were made up of individuals and 17.9% had someone living alone who was 65 years of age or older.

There were 5,777 housing units, of which 9.3% were vacant. Among occupied housing units, 58.6% were owner-occupied and 41.4% were renter-occupied. The homeowner vacancy rate was 2.8% and the rental vacancy rate was 9.4%.

Racial composition as of the 2020 census
Race	Number	Percent
White	10,994	94.1%
Black or African American	113	1.0%
American Indian and Alaska Native	12	0.1%
Asian	72	0.6%
Native Hawaiian and Other Pacific Islander	3	<0.1%
Some other race	50	0.4%
Two or more races	440	3.8%
Hispanic or Latino (of any race)	165	1.4%

=== 2010 census ===
As of the census of 2010, there were 12,362 people, 5,320 households, and 3,219 families residing in the city. The population density was 1,666.0 inhabitants per square mile (643.2/km^{2}). There were 5,983 housing units at an average density of 806.3 per square mile (311.3/km^{2}). The racial makeup of the city was 96.3% White, 1.1% African American, 0.2% Native American, 0.7% Asian, 0.5% from other races, and 1.3% from two or more races. Hispanic or Latino of any race were 1.6% of the population.

There were 5,320 households, of which 28.0% had children under the age of 18 living with them, 41.1% were married couples living together, 14.3% had a female householder with no husband present, 5.0% had a male householder with no wife present, and 39.5% were non-families. 34.3% of all households were made up of individuals, and 15.1% had someone living alone who was 65 years of age or older. The average household size was 2.26 and the average family size was 2.85.

The median age in the city was 41.1 years. 22% of residents were under the age of 18; 7.8% were between the ages of 18 and 24; 24.5% were from 25 to 44; 27.3% were from 45 to 64; and 18.2% were 65 years of age or older. The gender makeup of the city was 47.8% male and 52.2% female.

=== 2000 census ===
As of the census of 2000, there were 13,224 people, 5,559 households, and 3,552 families residing in the city. The population density was 1,812.0 inhabitants per square mile (699.6/km^{2}). There were 5,955 housing units at an average density of 816.0 per square mile (315.1/km^{2}). The racial makeup of the city was 97.38% White, 0.78% African American, 0.27% Native American, 0.51% Asian, 0.02% Pacific Islander, 0.26% from other races, and 0.78% from two or more races. Hispanic or Latino of any race were 0.98% of the population.

There were 5,559 households, out of which 29.6% had children under the age of 18 living with them, 46.6% were married couples living together, 13.0% had a female householder with no husband present, and 36.1% were non-families. 30.9% of all households were made up of individuals, and 12.8% had someone living alone who was 65 years of age or older. The average household size was 2.33 and the average family size was 2.90.

In the city, the population was spread out, with 24.3% under the age of 18, 8.8% from 18 to 24, 27.4% from 25 to 44, 23.4% from 45 to 64, and 16.1% who were 65 years of age or older. The median age was 38 years. For every 100 females, there were 89.9 males. For every 100 females age 18 and over, there were 86.3 males.

The median income for a household in the city was $32,394, and the median income for a family was $40,120. Males had a median income of $31,743 versus $20,795 for females. The per capita income for the city was $17,027. About 8.9% of families and 12.0% of the population were below the poverty line, including 15.6% of those under age 18 and 9.5% of those age 65 or over.

== Economy ==
The largest sectors in Bucyrus are agriculture, manufacturing, and healthcare. Bucyrus is the home of ESCO Bucyrus and D. Picking and Company, a family operated manufacturer of copper kettles and timpani drums. Some of the largest employers in Bucyrus include Avita Health System, Hord Family Farms, and Ohio Mutual Insurance Group.

=== Eagle Crusher ===
Eagle Crusher Company Incorporated manufactures heavy-duty impact crushers, portable crushing and screening plants, jaw crushers, and conveyors for the concrete, asphalt, aggregate, and recycle markets.

=== Bucyrus Copper Kettle Works Ltd. ===
Bucyrus Copper Kettle Works is a 150-year-old shop that began operations shortly after the Civil War. Seasonal demand for apple butter kettles at the local hardware store led the owners to retrain the store's tinsmiths as coppersmiths to produce kettles locally. A few years later, the partnership that ran the hardware store dissolved. One partner opened a new company on South Walnut Street where copper kettles and other products continue to be made using traditional processes.

=== Bucyrus Railcar Repair ===
Bucyrus Railcar Repair, LLC is a leading rail services provider, specializing in mechanical operations and railcar repair. BRR operates from one large flagship repair shop, three light repair shops, and over a dozen customer and interchange locations as running repair agent.

=== Advance Fiber Technology ===
Advanced Fiber Technology was formed in 1988 to initially design and provide equipment to the fiber processing industry and subsequently added recycled fiber processing in 2001 in a 22,500 square foot building.

=== Swan Rubber Company ===
The Swan Rubber Company was once the largest industry in Bucyrus, locally employing 1500 men and women, and having the largest payroll of any industry in Bucyrus. The Swan Rubber and Tire Company originated in Toledo on September 27, 1927. In 1929 the name is changed to Swan Rubber Company as tire production declined. In 1940 the company bought 30 acres along Beal Ave., the current site of the Bucyrus operations, until the facilities closed in the early part of this century. In 1950 the company began recycling and reclaiming rubber products, and by 1993 Swan became the largest recycling site in the state of Ohio. In 2001 Swan became part of the Tekni-Plex family of companies, making them the largest manufacturer of garden hose in the world. The company is currently headquartered in Atlanta, Georgia, with an office in Marion, Ohio.

=== Sommer Car Company ===
The Sommer Company was located on the east end of Bucyrus in the 1920s. The company manufactured automobile engines sold to Zimmerman, Sears and Roebuck and the Fort Wayne Truck Company. The company was purchased by the Allen Motorcar Company and manufactured their automobiles.

== Parks and recreation ==
Bucyrus, which calls itself "the Bratwurst Capital of America", is home to the Bucyrus Bratwurst Festival, held annually during the third weekend in August. It includes musical performances and a beauty pageant.

Bucyrus also has three murals by famed muralist Eric Grohe, including "Liberty Remembers", "Great American Crossroad" and the Schines Art Park mural completed in 2017.

Other recreation includes the Golf Club of Bucyrus, the Bucyrus Little Theatre, the Crawford Park District, the Crawford County Fair, and the Graffiti Cruise Custom Classic Car Show.

Bucyrus is home to numerous parks within the city limits on nearby. Aumiller Park, the largest within the city limits, was created through a land donation of the Aumiller Family. The amenities include a swimming pool, 5 ball diamonds, 18 hole disc golf course, basketball, pickleball, tennis courts, Kids Kingdom playground, dozens of picnic shelters, hiking and bike trails and the John Q. Shunk Memorial Carillon. Unger Park one of the many operated by the Crawford Park District is adjacent to Aumiller. Harmon Park also home of the Bucyrus Area Youth Soccer Club. Lions Park home of the city's skate park and two softball fields. Public fishing is available at the Crossroads Industrial Park pond or one of the city's four reservoirs with water capacity of over a billion gallons. The Outhwaite named for the former mayor is the largest it is above ground with a boat accessibility. The Riley The Neff and Pines

== Education ==
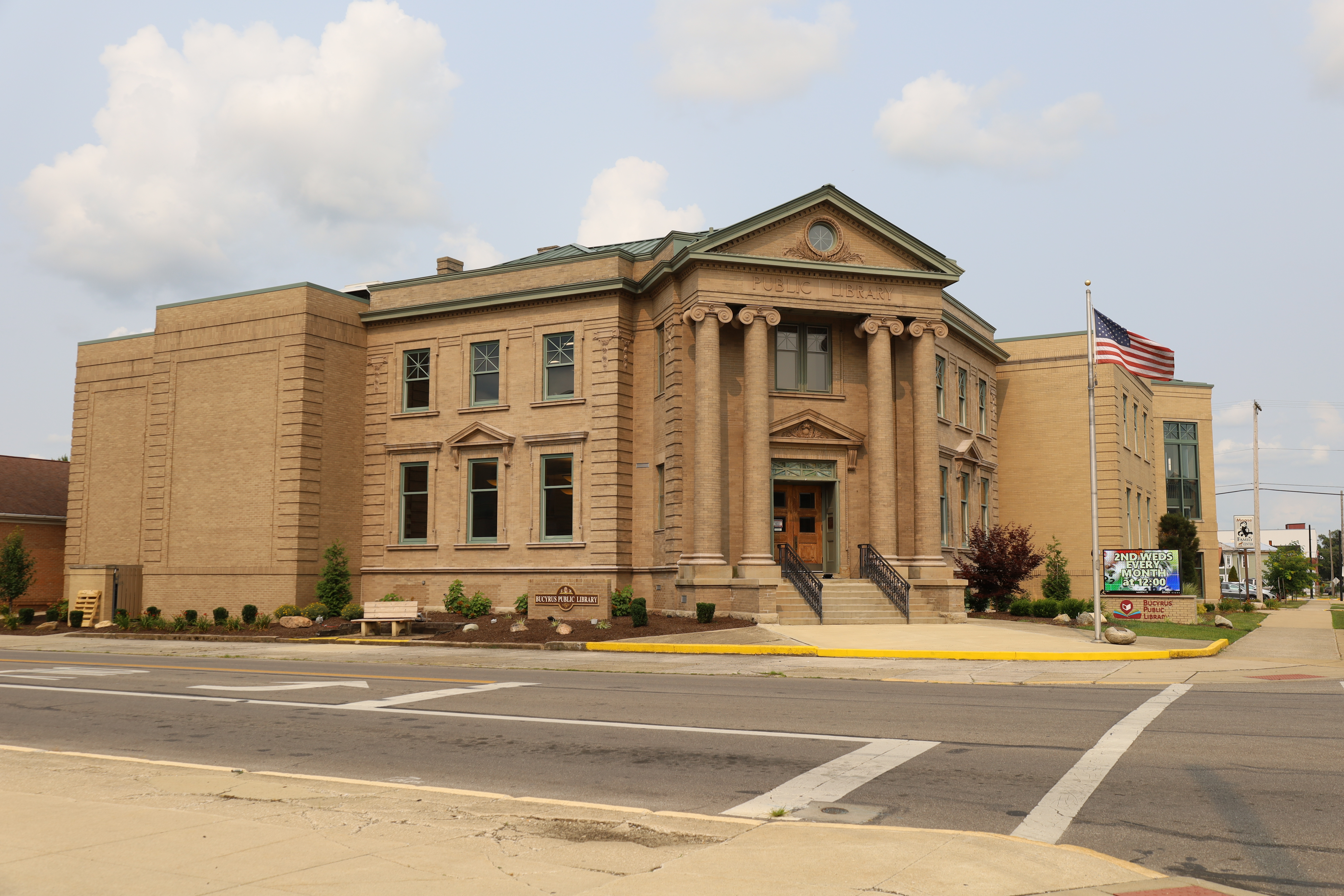
Bucyrus Public Library in 2023

Most of Bucyrus is served by the Bucyrus City School District, which currently includes one elementary school (preschool through 5th grade), and one junior/senior high (6th through 12th). The western edges of the city limits are served by the Wynford Local School District located just west of the city, and the far eastern portion of the city is in the Colonel Crawford Local School District, headquartered in nearby North Robinson.

Bucyrus is home to Crawford County's first institution of higher education, the Crawford Success Center, a satellite branch of North Central State College.

The city's public library is housed in its original Carnegie library building.

== Infrastructure ==
=== Transportation ===
The Port Bucyrus–Crawford County Airport is located one nautical mile (1.2 mi; 1.9 km) south of Bucyrus's central business district.

== Notable people ==
- Howard Atlee, press agent
- Samuel Beer, political scientist
- Ebenezer B. Finley, U.S. representative
- Stephen Ross Harris, U.S. representative
- Georgia Hopley, first female prohibition agent
- John Hopley, editor and publisher of the Bucyrus Journal
- Carol Kendall, children's book author
- Judson Laipply, YouTuber
- Gloria LeRoy, actress
- Matthew Livelsberger, perpetrator of the Las Vegas Trump International Hotel Cybertruck bombing
- Harry L. Martin, Medal of Honor recipient
- Bob Monnett, NFL football player
- Paul Pfeifer, Ohio Supreme Court justice
- Carrie Fulton Phillips, presidential mistress
- Lauretta Schimmoler, aviator
- Micah Schnabel, author and singer/songwriter
- Cecil Souders, NFL football player
- Fred Trautman, baseball player
- Edward Vollrath, U.S. Army brigadier general
- Howard Wakefield, baseball player

== See also ==
- Wynford Local School District
