= North Robinson, Ohio =

- Village
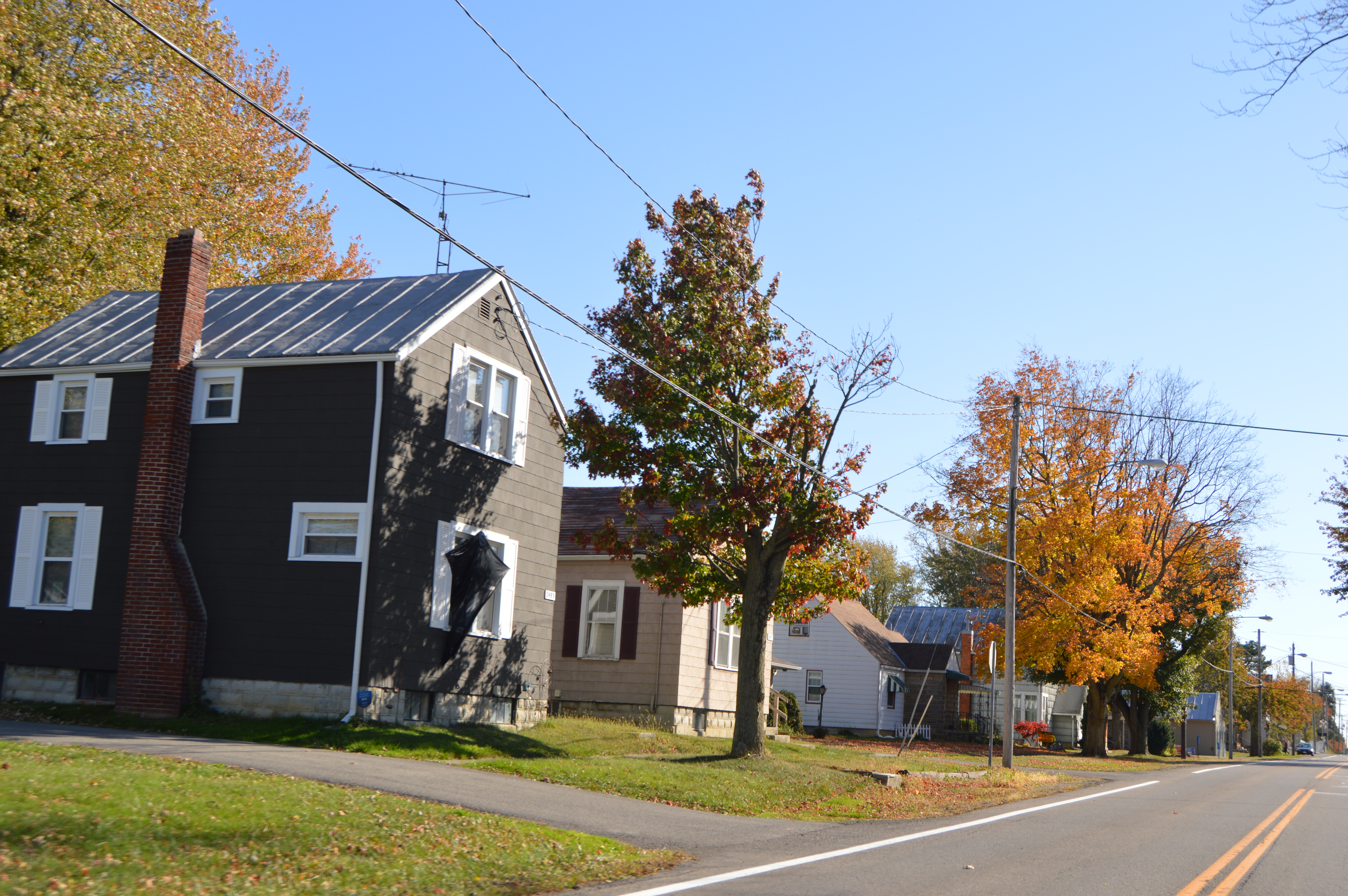
- Houses on Main Street

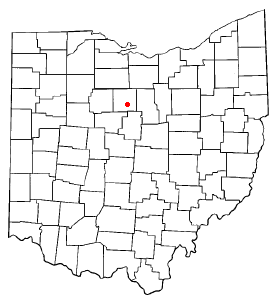
- Location of North Robinson, Ohio

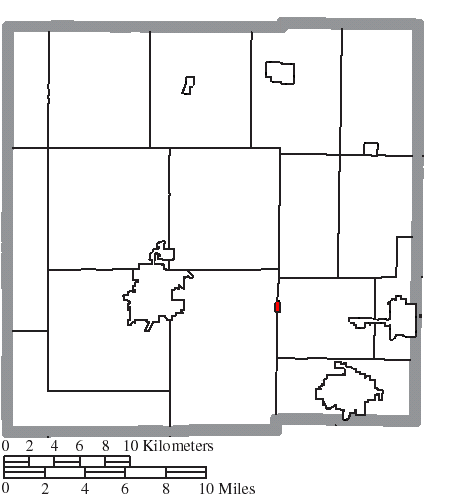
- Location of North Robinson in Crawford County
- Coordinates: 40°47′33″N 82°51′24″W
- Country: United States
- State: Ohio
- County: Crawford

Area
  - Total: 0.11 sq mi (0.28 km^{2})
  - Land: 0.11 sq mi (0.28 km^{2})
  - Water: 0 sq mi (0.00 km^{2})
- Elevation: 1,070 ft (330 m)

Population (2020)
  - Total: 219
  - Density: 2,059.0/sq mi (794.97/km^{2})
- Time zone: UTC-5 (Eastern (EST))
  - Summer (DST): UTC-4 (EDT)
- ZIP code: 44856
- Area code: 419
- FIPS code: 39-56994
- GNIS feature ID: 2399522

North Robinson is a village in Crawford County, Ohio, United States. The population was 219 at the 2020 census.

== History ==
North Robinson was laid out in 1861. It was named for the Robinson family of pioneer settlers.

On September 4, 2017, a tornado struck the northern part of the village, resulting in significant damage.

== Geography ==
According to the United States Census Bureau, the village has a total area of 0.10 square miles (0.26 km^{2}), all land.

== Demographics ==
Historical population
Census	Pop.	Note	%±
1880	182		—
1890	257		41.2%
1900	200		−22.2%
1910	155		−22.5%
1920	159		2.6%
1930	185		16.4%
1940	195		5.4%
1950	252		29.2%
1960	289		14.7%
1970	277		−4.2%
1980	302		9.0%
1990	216		−28.5%
2000	211		−2.3%
2010	205		−2.8%
2020	219		6.8%
U.S. Decennial Census

=== 2010 census ===
As of the census of 2010, there were 205 people, 82 households, and 64 families living in the village. The population density was 2,050.0 inhabitants per square mile (791.5/km^{2}). There were 90 housing units at an average density of 900.0 per square mile (347.5/km^{2}). The racial makeup of the village was 97.6% White, 0.5% Asian, and 2.0% from two or more races. Hispanic or Latino of any race were 2.9% of the population.

There were 82 households, of which 31.7% had children under the age of 18 living with them, 59.8% were married couples living together, 11.0% had a female householder with no husband present, 7.3% had a male householder with no wife present, and 22.0% were non-families. 19.5% of all households were made up of individuals, and 9.8% had someone living alone who was 65 years of age or older. The average household size was 2.50 and the average family size was 2.77.

The median age in the village was 41.8 years. 24.4% of residents were under the age of 18; 4.9% were between the ages of 18 and 24; 26.9% were from 25 to 44; 28.3% were from 45 to 64; and 15.6% were 65 years of age or older. The gender makeup of the village was 50.7% male and 49.3% female.

=== 2000 census ===
As of the census of 2000, there were 211 people, 82 households, and 61 families living in the village. The population density was 2,153.3 inhabitants per square mile (831.4/km^{2}). There were 88 housing units at an average density of 898.1 per square mile (346.8/km^{2}). The racial makeup of the village was 99.05% White, 0.47% Pacific Islander, 0.47% from other races.

There were 82 households, out of which 31.7% had children under the age of 18 living with them, 67.1% were married couples living together, 3.7% had a female householder with no husband present, and 25.6% were non-families. 22.0% of all households were made up of individuals, and 12.2% had someone living alone who was 65 years of age or older. The average household size was 2.57 and the average family size was 3.03.

In the village, the population was spread out, with 23.2% under the age of 18, 8.1% from 18 to 24, 25.1% from 25 to 44, 31.8% from 45 to 64, and 11.8% who were 65 years of age or older. The median age was 42 years. For every 100 females there were 90.1 males. For every 100 females age 18 and over, there were 90.6 males.

The median income for a household in the village was $30,625, and the median income for a family was $38,750. Males had a median income of $27,250 versus $21,250 for females. The per capita income for the village was $13,110. About 7.2% of families and 8.9% of the population were below the poverty line, including 12.9% of those under the age of eighteen and none of those 65 or over.
