= Timeline of the Islamic State (2019) =

This is a timeline of incidents involving the Islamic State movement in 2019.

== Timeline ==
=== January 2019 ===
- On January 27, two bombs exploded at the Roman Catholic Cathedral of Our Lady of Mount Carmel in Jolo, Sulu, in the Philippines. Twenty people were killed and 102 others injured. The 2019 Jolo Cathedral bombings were done by Abu Sayyaf Group (ASG), with IS officially calling the group as the Islamic State – East Asia Province.

=== March 2019 ===
- In March 2019, the Islamic State were declared "defeated" in Iraq and Syria by their opponents.
- 15 March 2019 – An Australian terrorist killed 51 people in the Christchurch shooting, inspired by the antisemitic Great Replacement conspiracy theory and the death of an 11-year-old girl in an ISIS attack. The Christchurch attack featured in Islamic State propaganda with Abu Hassan al-Muhajir calling for attacks on the “nations of the Cross and the apostate” in retaliation for the attack.

=== August 2019 ===
- A suicide attack attributed to ISIS targeted Gaza Strip police. Three police officers were killed, all three victims were allegedly members of Hamas. Gaza's Security forces responded by arresting ten people whom they suspected were members of the cell who arranged the attack.

=== October 2019 ===
- On October 9, the United States took custody of two high-profile British members of IS previously held in Syria by Kurdish-led fighters of the Syrian Democratic Forces. US media reports identified the two as El Shafee Elsheikh and Alexanda Amon Kotey. The two were members of the 4-member execution squad dubbed "The Beatles" by the Western media. They are part of an extremely violent four-man cell that kidnapped and tortured foreigners, including journalists, at the height of IS's power in Syria and Iraq. A third member of the group named Mohammed Emwazi, the notorious Jihadi John was killed in a drone attack on 12 November 2015 and the fourth, Aine Lesley Davis is in prison in Turkey.
- On October 10, Indonesia's security minister Wiranto was injured after a stabbing attack perpetrated by Syahril Alamsyah, also known as Abu Rara, and his wife Fitri Andriana, both members of the banned Jamaah Ansharut Daulah (JAD), an IS-linked Indonesian terror group. The same group carried out a series of attacks in Jakarta's business district known as the 2016 Jakarta attacks as well as bombings of churches known as the Surabaya bombings in 2018.
- On October 27, Abu Bakr al-Baghdadi, the Iraqi-born leader and self-declared Caliph of the Islamic State (IS), killed himself by detonating a suicide vest during the Barisha raid, conducted by the U.S. 75th Ranger Regiment and the U.S. Delta Force, in Syria's northwestern Idlib Province. The commander of the United States Central Command, General Kenneth F. McKenzie Jr., stated that al-Baghdadi also killed two children when he exploded his vest and was buried at sea after being offered Islamic funeral rites. On 31 October 2019, IS confirmed that Abu Bakr al-Baghdadi was dead,
- On October 31, less than a week after the Barisha raid leading to the death of Abu Bakr al-Baghdadi, Abu Ibrahim al-Hashimi al-Qurashi was elected by a shura council as the new caliph of IS, indicating that the group still considers itself a caliphate despite having lost all of its territory in Iraq and Syria, Al-Hashimi's appointment was supposedly done in accordance with the advice of al-Baghdadi, meaning the new emir was named as a successor by Baghdadi himself.

=== November 2019 ===
- On November 4, Turkish authorities said they had captured a sister of the dead IS leader Abu Bakr al-Baghdadi, Rasmiya Awad, in the northern Syrian town of Azaz. The authorities hope Awad may provide a trove of intelligence.
- On November 6, Turkish President Recep Tayyip Erdogan said Turkey had captured a wife of IS leader Abu Bakr al-Baghdadi, more than a week after Baghdadi killed himself during a raid by US special forces. Al-Baghdadi was known to have four wives, the maximum number one can have under Islamic law at one time.

=== December 2019 ===
- On 7 December, IS claimed the killing of Captain Mohammed Saleh Al Radfani in Aden, Yemen. He died from a gun wound and was a paramilitary security commander from the Security Belt Forces.
