= United States Penitentiary, Canaan =

High-security federal prison in Pennsylvania, US

Coordinates: 41°33′46″N 75°25′17″W

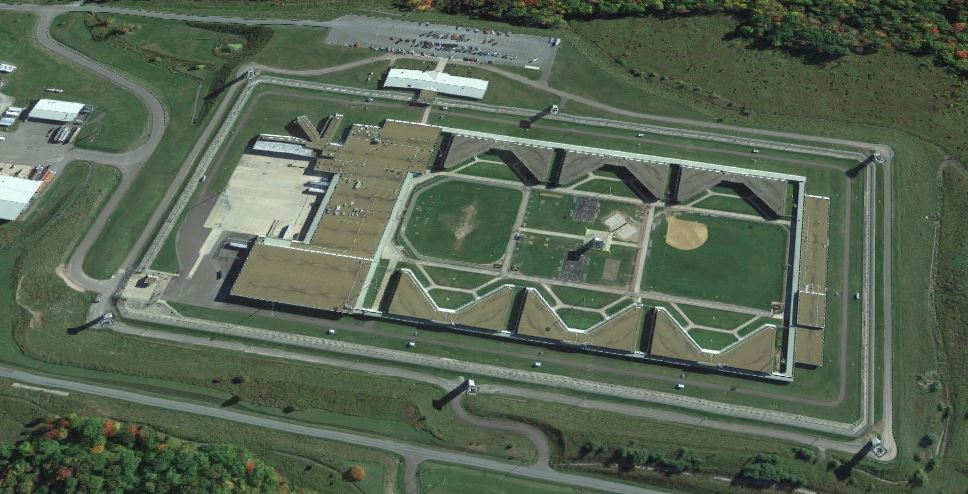
- Interactive map of United States Penitentiary, Canaan
- Location: Canaan Township, Wayne County, near Waymart, Pennsylvania
- Status: Operational
- Security class: High-security (with minimum-security prison camp)
- Population: 1,269 [1,183 at the USP, 86 in prison camp] (September 2023)
- Opened: 2005
- Managed by: Federal Bureau of Prisons
- Warden: Charles Maiorana

The United States Penitentiary, Canaan (USP Canaan) is a high-security United States federal prison for male inmates in northeastern Pennsylvania, with a satellite prison camp for minimum-security male inmates. It is operated by the Federal Bureau of Prisons, a division of the United States Department of Justice.

USP Canaan is located in Canaan Township, Wayne County, Pennsylvania, 20 miles (32 km) east of Scranton and 134 miles (216 km) north of Philadelphia.

== History and facility ==
USP Canaan is a 170,000-square-yard (140,000 m^{2}) facility designed by David R. Cassara Associates, Structural Engineering and Consulting of Rochester, New York for $141 million. USP Canaan opened in March 2005 and is designed to house 1088 male inmates in six housing units. Six V-shaped buildings facing each other and a larger maintenance building surround a central yard with a tower in the middle. Six additional towers are lined along the rectangular-shaped facility. The facility is surrounded by a lethal electrical double fence.

Cells are approximately 4 m × 2 m (13.1 ft × 6.6 ft) in size, equipped with a bunkbed, a stainless-steel sink-toilet combination, and a small table with a non-removable stool. Cells are usually occupied by two inmates and are air conditioned. The administrative and disciplinary unit, called the Special Housing Unit, can hold approximately 250 inmates. Cells in the disciplinary unit have showers and are occupied by two inmates.

Units A1 & A2, closest to the dining area and the Receiving & Discharge area, are primarily used for inmates in transit. One-unit houses Minimum and Low security inmates in transit and the other housing Medium and Maximum-security inmates. Administrative Maximum custody inmates are generally housed in the SHU during transit. These units have also been used when the USP Canaan SHU is filled beyond capacity. Inmates will then be locked in a cell without a shower and only be able to shower three times weekly.

Inmate transit usually occurs at least twice a week to and from USP Canaan with Monday being the “airlift” day where inmates are brought to the Harrisburg airport by bus for secure transit to another prison. The trips to the next prison occur either by another bus trip or a flight on what is often called “Con Air” (operated by US Marshals Justice Prisoner Air Transportation System or JPATS). Tuesday is generally the transit day for inmates going to or from MDC Brooklyn and MCC Manhattan (when it was open).

== Notable incidents ==
Four inmate murders have taken place at USP Canaan since its opening in 2005.

- On April 25, 2010, Allen Hurley, an inmate serving a 37-year sentence for multiple armed robberies, became involved in a physical altercation with Joseph O'Kane while they were both in Hurley's cell. Hurley pulled out a homemade prison knife known as a shank, and stabbed O'Kane 92 times. O'Kane, an associate of the Gambino Crime Family in New York City who was serving a life sentence for racketeering and murder, died at the scene. Hurley was convicted of manslaughter on 21 June 2012 and was sentenced to life in prison in September 2012. Hurley is now incarcerated at ADX Florence.
- On August 23, 2010, inmate Jose Antonio Perez, the leader of a major drug trafficking ring in Hartford, Connecticut, died of a single stab wound to the neck. Perez was serving a life sentence for drug trafficking and murder for hire in connection with the 2002 shooting death of Theodore Casiano, the leader of a rival drug trafficking organization. Perez's murder remains under investigation.
- On January 11, 2013, inmate Ephraim Goitom was pronounced dead at a hospital about an hour after a fight. Goitom had been serving a 25-year sentence for shooting a police officer during a raid on Goitom's home.
- On February 25, 2013, an inmate of the prison attacked and murdered Correction Officer Eric Williams, 34, of Nanticoke, Pennsylvania. Jessie Con-ui, already jailed for life for slaying a gang rival in Arizona, was identified as the suspect in the murder of Williams. Con-ui and two other gang members fatally shot Carlos Garcia outside a laundry facility in East Phoenix, Ariz. in August 2002 to "further or assist" the gang's criminal conduct, according to state prosecutors and Maricopa County, Ariz. court records. Con-ui, 36, was scheduled to complete his federal sentence in September 2013 and would have immediately been returned to Arizona to begin serving his life term for the 2002 murder. Con-ui, at the time of the incident, was serving an 11-year term for gang-related drug trafficking.

Other incidents: In June 2011, 300 inmates and several staff members became ill after eating chicken in the prison dining room. The Pennsylvania Department of Health was called in to investigate and determined that the cause was salmonella poisoning. The incident constituted one of the largest institutional outbreaks of salmonella poisoning in US history. No one became critically ill.

== Notable inmates (current and former) ==
=== Terrorists ===
Inmate Name	Register Number	Status	Details
Abdul Kadir	64656-053	Deceased. Died on June 28, 2018 while serving a life sentence.	Al-Qaeda supporter; convicted of terrorism conspiracy for his role in a foiled plot to bomb John F. Kennedy Airport in Queens, New York in 2007; three co-conspirators are serving sentences at other federal facilities.
Chhun Yasith	31900-112	Serving a life sentence.	US citizen and President of the Cambodian Freedom Fighters; convicted in 2008 of leading a series of deadly attacks against civilian and government targets in an attempt to oust Cambodian Prime Minister Hun Sen in 2000.
Frank James	83999-053	Transferred to ADX Florence. Serving 10 concurrent life sentences plus 10 years without parole.	Perpetrator of the 2022 New York City Subway attack.
Alexanda Amon Kotey	11685-509	Transferred to ADX Florence. Serving eight concurrent life sentences.	One of the four members of the British "ISIS Beatles" and also known as "Jihadi George". Kotey was convicted of hostage taking and providing material support to a terror organization for his role in the kidnapping, torture, and murders of dozens European and American citizens between 2012 and 2015. Kotey was convicted of beheading and torturing four Americans in 2021 and sentenced to life in prison. Another member of the "ISIS Beatles", El Shafee Elsheikh, was also tried and convicted and received a life sentence.

=== Organized crime figures ===
Inmate Name	Register Number	Status	Details
Juan Matta-Ballesteros	37671-133	Transferred to MCFP Springfield. Serving a life sentence under the name Juan Ramon Matta-Lopez.	Drug kingpin with ties to the Medellin Cartel in Colombia; convicted in 1990 of orchestrating the 1985 kidnapping and murder of Drug Enforcement Administration Agent Enrique Camarena.
Charles Carneglia	08773-016	Serving a life sentence.	Gambino crime family soldier, sentenced to life in prison for racketeering, armed robbery, kidnapping, extortion, and four murders, including the murder of Brooklyn court officer Albert Gelb, who was murdered four days before he was set to testify against Carneglia in court.
Steven Crea	48635-066	Serving a life sentence.	Lucchese crime family underboss. Convicted in 2019 for murder and racketeering.
Benjamín Arellano Félix	00678-748	Transferred to USP Lee. Serving a 25-year sentence; scheduled release on April 28, 2032.	Former kingpin of the Tijuana Cartel, sentenced to 25 years for racketeering and conspiracy to launder money.
Ronell Wilson	71460-053	Transferred to USP Coleman. Serving a life sentence.	Gang leader in Staten Island, New York; murdered NYPD Detectives James Nemorin and Rodney Andrews, who were conducting a sting operation to buy an illegal gun in 2003. Wilson was initially on death row before having his sentence reduced to life without parole on the grounds of that he was mentally disabled.
Anthony Senter	07555-054	Released on June 21, 2024, after serving 35 years of a life sentence.	Lucchese crime family hitman and former member of the DeMeo crew. Convicted of ten counts of murder in 1989 and sentenced to life imprisonment.

=== Other ===
Inmate Name	Register Number	Status	Details
Luke Sommer	38474-086	Transferred to USP Coleman. Serving a 24-year sentence plus 20 years; scheduled for release on June 9, 2034.	Former US Army Ranger; pleaded guilty to bank robbery in 2008 for masterminding the takeover robbery of a bank in Tacoma, Washington; pleaded guilty in 2010 to attempting to solicit the murder of an Assistant United States Attorney.
Mohammad Shibin	78207-083	Transferred to FMC Butner. Serving a life sentence.	Somali pirate leader; convicted in 2012 of piracy, kidnapping, and hostage-taking for acting as a ransom negotiator during the hijacking of the civilian vessel Quest in 2010 and the oil tanker Miranda Marguerite in 2011; Shibin is the highest-ranking pirate ever prosecuted.
Peter Schwartz	28815-509	Served a 14 year and two month sentence; originally scheduled for release on March 29, 2033; pardoned and released on January 20, 2025.	Convicted for his involvement during the January 6 United States Capitol attack, he attacked officers by spraying them with a “super soaker” full of pepper spray.
Gregory Abbott	86702-054	Released on January 28, 2020.	Charged with connection to the 2019 college admissions bribery scandal.
John Rigas Timothy Rigas	53983-054 53982-054	John Rigas was released on February 22, 2016; Timothy Rigas was released on January 14, 2022.	Father and son executives at Adelphia Communications Corporation; convicted in 2004 of bank fraud and other charges for stealing millions of dollars from the company and concealing its debt from investors to keep its stock price high.
Timothy L. Tyler	99672-012	Released on August 30, 2018.	An American who was sentenced to life in prison without parole for possession and distribution of LSD (or "acid") under the federal three-strikes law. In August 2016, after serving 24 years and 27 days behind bars, Tyler was granted clemency by President Barack Obama.
Paul Manafort	35207-016	Pardoned by President Donald Trump in 2020	An American political consultant and former campaign chairman for US president Donald Trump, Manafort was found guilty of tax fraud, bank fraud, and witness tampering.
Pooh Shiesty	52490-509	His release was on October 7, 2025, after serving three years of his five-year, three-month sentence, which was an early release based on time served and good behavior. His original projected release date was April 2026.	American rapper Pooh Shiesty was sentenced to five years and three months in prison for his gun conspiracy conviction linked to a confrontation outside a Florida hotel in October 2020 that ended with a man shot in the buttocks.
Leonard Peltier	89637-132	On home confinement as of 2025.	Transferred from USP Lewisburg and attacked by multiple inmates.
Anthony "Harv" Ellison	86282-054	Serving a 24-year sentence; scheduled for release January 12, 2042.	Member of the Nine Trey Gangsters, orchestrated the kidnapping and robbery of rapper 6ix9ine in 2018.

== See also ==
- List of U.S. federal prisons
- Incarceration in the United States
