= 1997 Cambodian coup d'état =

Self-coup by Hun Sen against co-premier Norodom Ranariddh

- Part of Aftermath of the Cambodian conflict
| Date | 5 July – 7 September 1997 (2 months and 2 days) |
| Location | Cambodia: Mostly in Phnom Penh; Cities: Samraong; Serei Saophoan; Pailin; Ou Smach |
| Result | Co-premier Norodom Ranariddh is ousted by co-premier Hun Sen and exiled until 1998, Hun Sen begins consolidation of power |

Belligerents
| Cambodian People's Party; Supported by: Thailand; Vietnam | FUNCINPEC | (Cambodia) Khmer Rouge (mostly in the northern provinces) |

Commanders and leaders
| Hun Sen; Ke Kim Yan | Norodom Ranariddh; Nhek Bun Chhay; Serei Kosal (in Battambang Province) | (Cambodia) Ta Mok |

Casualties and losses
| Unknown | Around 40 party officials killed | Unknown |
- 32 civilians killed (5–6 July); 1+ Thai soldiers killed, 2+ soldiers injured

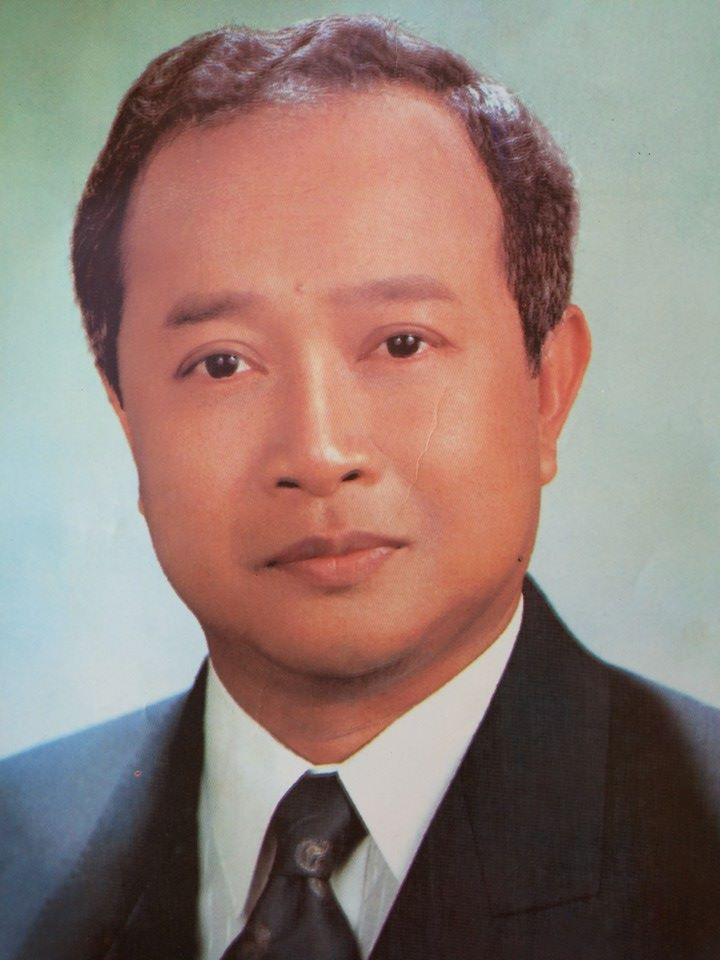
First Prime Minister Norodom Ranariddh

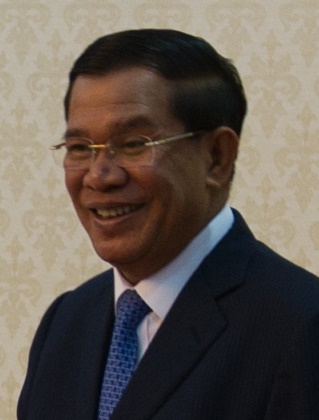
Second Prime Minister Hun Sen

The 1997 Cambodian coup d'état (Khmer: រដ្ឋប្រហារកម្ពុជាឆ្នាំ១៩៩៧, UNGEGN: Rôdthâbrâhar Kâmpŭchéa chhnăm 1997) took place in Cambodia from July to September 1997. As a result, co-premier Hun Sen ousted the other co-premier Norodom Ranariddh. At least 32 people were killed during the coup.

== Background ==
After being embroiled in civil conflict from the late 1960s until the early 1990s, on March 16, 1992, the UN Transitional Authority in Cambodia (UNTAC), under UNSYG Special Representative Yasushi Akashi and Lt. General John Sanderson, arrived in Cambodia to begin implementation of the UN Settlement Plan, that was concluded as a result of the Paris Peace Accords of 1991. Free elections were held in 1993.

The Khmer Rouge or Party of Democratic Kampuchea (PDK), whose forces were never actually disarmed or demobilized, barred some people from participating in 1993 elections in the 10–15 percent of the country (holding six percent of the population) it then controlled. Altogether, over four million Cambodians (about 90% of eligible voters) participated in the May election.

Prince Norodom Ranariddh's royalist FUNCINPEC Party was the top vote recipient with 45.5% vote, followed by Hun Sen's Cambodian People's Party (CPP) and the Buddhist Liberal Democratic Party (of Son Sann), respectively. Despite the victory, the FUNCINPEC had to enter into coalition talks with the Cambodian People's Party, led by Hun Sen, who refused to relinquish power. After being in power since the Vietnamese invasion in 1979, Hun and the CPP had largely maintained control of the state apparatus including the Royal Cambodian Armed Forces in spite of losing the election. Hun and his deputy Norodom Chakrapong also threatened a secessionist movement and claimed there would be a return to civil conflict if they were unable to maintain power.

After talks, Prince Ranariddh and Hun Sen became First and Second Prime Ministers, respectively, in the Royal Cambodian Government.

== Events ==
In 1997, long tensions between the two governing parties led to violence between FUNCINPEC supporters of Prince Norodom Ranariddh and of Hun Sen, resulting in a number of casualties.

In retrospect, the following issues have been identified as the causes of the violent events: the 'dual power' accorded by the 1993 power sharing formula allowed the CPP to retain control over power structures; while officially a ruling party, the FUNCINPEC concluded an alliance – National United Front – with the opposition Sam Rainsy Party. Hun Sen alleged that Ranariddh had been planning a take-over with the help of Khmer Rouge fighters, supposedly smuggled into the capital.

On 5 July 1997, CPP troops led by General Ke Kim Yan surrounded a military garrison belonging to Nhek Bun Chhay in Kampong Speu Province. Ke Kim Yan attempted to convince Nhek Bun Chhay to disband his garrison, but failed. At the same time, security force personnels aligned to the CPP approached the residence of another FUNCINPEC general, Chao Sambath, and demanded FUNCINPEC troops surrender their weapons. Nhek Bun Chhay responded by ordering FUNCINPEC troops to resist the advances made by the CPP's troops and security personnel, and heavy clashes broke out at the Taing Krassang military base and Phnom Penh International Airport, where most of FUNCINPEC troops were based in.

Hun Sen quickly returned from his vacation at Vung Tau in Vietnam. The following day, Hun Sen deployed his bodyguard units to support the regular forces fighting FUNCINPEC troops. FUNCINPEC troops initiated two attempts to counterattack CPP troops, but were outnumbered and subsequently repulsed by Hun Sen's bodyguards and regular troops, suffering heavy casualties in the process. FUNCINPEC troops then retreated from their positions and fled to O Smach in Oddar Meanchey Province. Hun Sen declared Ranariddh ousted from power.

After the royalist resistance was crushed in Phnom Penh, there was indeed some joint resistance by FUNCINPEC-Khmer Rouge forces in the Northern provinces, where the fighting against Hun Sen's offensive lasted until September 1997. CPP forces carried out summary executions of FUNCINPEC ministers. Between 41 and 60 people were executed in custody, and a United Nations report found a large number of incinerated bodies.

Following the seizure of power by Hun Sen, Prince Ranariddh went into exile in Paris. Other FUNCINPEC leaders were forced to flee the country, following the executions. With the FUNCINPEC-aligned forces now divided, the party ceased to have military power. Ung Huot was elected as the new First Prime Minister.

== Aftermath ==
Thomas Hammarberg, the United Nations Special Representative on human rights in Cambodia, condemned the violence, and made it clear in his October 1997 report to the UN General Assembly: the events of July 5–6 were a "coup d'état." The Cambodian People's Party rejected the characterization of the events as a coup. The coup had a severe impact on the tourism industry in Cambodia during 1997.

The United States cut aid to Cambodia in response. ASEAN withdrew a previous invitation for Cambodia to join as a member as a result of the coup. Its accession did not take place until 1999. Amnesty International also condemned the summary executions in an open letter to Hun Sen.

The CPP stated that they were committed to free and fair elections in 1998. However, the party had now established "politico-military domination". FUNCINPEC leaders returned to Cambodia shortly before the 1998 general elections. The CPP received 41% of the vote, FUNCINPEC 32%, and the Sam Rainsy Party (SRP) 13%. Many international observers judged the elections to have been seriously flawed, claiming political violence, intimidation, and lack of media access. The CPP and FUNCINPEC formed another coalition government, with CPP as the senior partner.

The coup is seen as a major turning point in the CPP and Hun Sen's consolidation of power into de facto one-party rule by 2018.

== See also ==
- 1998 Cambodian general election
- 1994 Cambodian coup d'état attempt
- 2000 Cambodian coup d'état attempt
- Modern Cambodia
