= Celso Rodrigues Da Costa =

- Born: Lisbon
- Other name: Abu Isa Andaluzi
- Occupations: salesman, athlete, jihadist
- Known for: Appeared in controversial online videos

Celso Rodrigues Da Costa was born in Portugal, and travelled to the United Kingdom, where he was converted to a militant form of Islam, and travelled to Daesh occupied Syria to volunteer to be a jihadi fighter.

The Times reports that, while living in London, he worked as a sales assistant for Harrods.

Da Costa's older brother, Edgar Da Costa, was the first of a group of Portuguese friends, living in the UK, to travel to Syria, leaving in 2012. The five had all had aspirations to play association football at a professional level, and some commentators speculated that jihadist recruiters were using football clubs as a recruiting venue. UK Security officials at MI-5 had been monitoring Da Costa, and a group of radicalized Portuguese friends living in the UK, before his departure for Daesh.

In April 2014 a provocative video was broadcast from Daesh controlled internet accounts where a masked man with a strong accent called upon Muslims in the west to fight for Daesh. The caption to the video identified him as someone who had played for the Arsenal football club. Lassana Diarra felt called upon to deny he was behind the video, when commentators first speculated that he was the masked figure. Experts with UK security agencies identified the accent as Portuguese, and named Da Costa as the masked man. The Arsenal football club stated they had never carried Da Costa on their player's roster, but said he may have participated in a training camp.

Da Costa has been identified as the individual behind provocative social media posts, from Daesh territory. He is alleged to have been part of the unit of foreign volunteers that included the individuals known as the "Jihadi Beatles".

In November 2015 Da Costa stirred more controversy through a video in which he said that, in addition to sacrificing a sheep, for the festival of Eid, he had "killed a dirty kaffir", as well.

Da Costa married Reema Iqbal, a citizen of the United Kingdom, in 2010. In 2014, shortly before travelling to the Daesh territory he took a second wife, Natalie Bracht. His first wife Reema Iqbal was born in the United Kingdom, to parents originally from Pakistan. His second wife, Bracht, was a joint citizen of the United Kingdom and Germany, who was raised in Germany, by her German mother.
