= Sokhom So =

Cambodian activist

Sokhom So is the Vice President of the Cambodian Freedom Fighters, an anti-communist militant organization that operates primarily in the United States.

So once said, the "U.S. overthrew Saddam Hussein's government. If I'm a terrorist, then George W. Bush is a terrorist too."

In 1997, he became a born-again Christian after a failed coup d’état attempt against the Cambodian government.

So has served as President of Dominique Jewelry Incorporated, a jewelry store in Arlington, Virginia, since 1990.
