= Jurijus =

Jurijus is a Lithuanian masculine given name. Notable people with the name include:

- Jurijus Kadamovas (born 1966), immigrant to the United States (from Lithuania)
- Jurijus Veklenko (born 1990), Lithuanian singer
