= Jurijus Kadamovas and Iouri Mikhel =

Soviet-born American serial killers

Jurijus Kadamovas
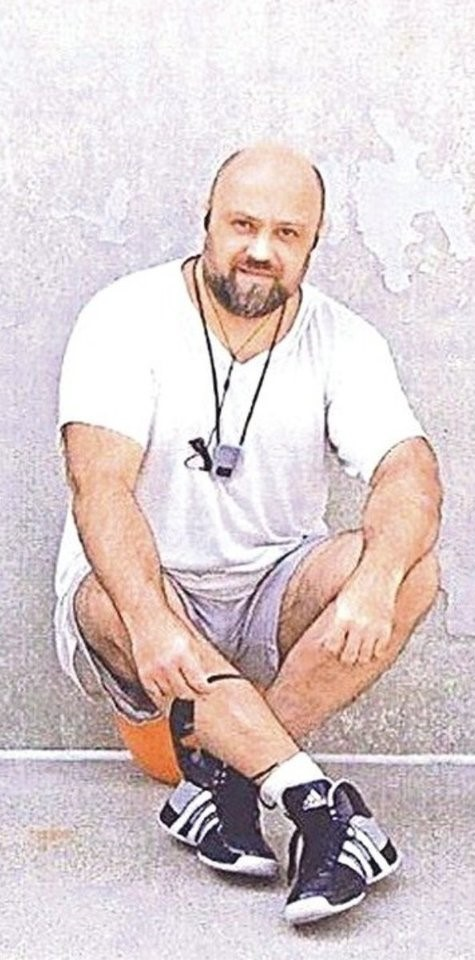
- Kadamovas on death row
- Born: October 22, 1966 (age 59); Vilnius, Lithuanian SSR, Soviet Union
- Convictions: Hostage taking resulting in death (3 counts); Conspiracy to commit hostage taking resulting in death Conspiracy to launder monetary instruments Conspiracy to escape from custody
- Penalty: Death; commuted to life imprisonment without the possibility of parole

Details
- Victims: 5
- Span of crimes: October 2001 – January 2002
- Country: United States
- State: California
- Date apprehended: February 2002
- Imprisoned at: USP Terre Haute

Iouri Mikhel
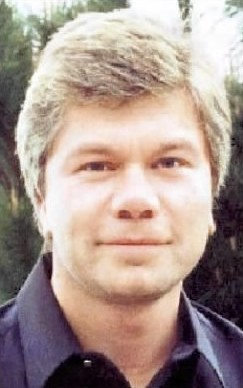
- Mikhel before his arrest
- Born: Iouri Gherman Mikhel; April 9, 1965 (age 61); Leningrad, Russian SFSR, Soviet Union
- Convictions: Hostage taking resulting in death (3 counts); Conspiracy to commit hostage taking resulting in death Conspiracy to launder monetary instruments Conspiracy to escape from custody
- Penalty: Death; commuted to life imprisonment without the possibility of parole

Details
- Victims: 5
- Span of crimes: October 2001 – January 2002
- Country: United States
- State: California
- Date apprehended: February 2002
- Imprisoned at: USP Terre Haute

Jurijus Kadamovas (born October 22, 1966) and Iouri Gherman Mikhel (born April 9, 1965) are Soviet-born American serial killers who immigrated to the United States from Lithuania and Russia, respectively. They were convicted of kidnapping and murdering five people. The kidnappings occurred over a four-month period beginning in late 2001, in which the kidnappers demanded ransom.

Documents related to the case allege the crew demanded a total of more than US$5.5 million (equivalent to $10.0 million in 2025) from relatives and associates, and received more than $1 million (equivalent to $1.8 million in 2025) from victim's relatives. Prosecutors said the victims were killed regardless of whether the ransoms were paid. The bodies were tied with weights, and dumped in the New Melones Lake near Yosemite National Park. Federal prosecutors sought the death penalty under murder during a hostage-taking, (18 U.S.C. 1203), a federal crime.

On March 12, 2007, Kadamovas and Mikhel were sentenced to death. Four others were sentenced for participating in the plot, receiving sentences ranging from 11 years to life imprisonment. Kadamovas and Mikhel lost their final appeal on October 7, 2019, but remained on federal death row until their sentences were commuted to life without parole by President Joe Biden on December 23, 2024.

== Background ==
Jurijus Kadamovas was born on October 22, 1966, in Vilnius, Lithuania, and Iouri Gherman Mikhel was born on April 9, 1965, in Leningrad, USSR. Both men were foreign nationals who emigrated to the United States and lived in Los Angeles, California. They each owned a house in San Fernando Valley, with Kadamovas living in Sherman Oaks and Mikhel living in Encino. The men owned a joint business called Designed Water World, which was a fish aquarium store located on Ventura Boulevard.

== Murders ==
=== Meyer Muscatel ===
In October 2001, Kadamovas and Mikhel came up with a plan to lure and kidnap 58-year-old Meyer Muscatel, a local real-estate developer. Mikhel posed as a businessman interested in buying real estate. Muscatel was lured to Mikhel's house in Encino where Kadamovas and another accomplice were waiting. Muscatel was bound, handcuffed, duct-taped and pistol whipped in the head. His wallet and credit cards were taken and he was then questioned about his finances. Kadamovas and Mikhel attempted to withdraw money from his account but the bank account was frozen. Muscatel was then injected with diphenhydramine and pinned to the ground, where Mikhel placed a plastic bag over his head and suffocated him to death. Muscatel's body was then taken in Kadamovas’ van to the New Melones Lake. The pair then tossed his body off Parrotts Ferry Bridge into the reservoir.

=== Rita Pekler ===
Their next target was 37-year-old George Safiev, a wealthy Russian businessman who lived in Beverly Hills. In December 2001, the pair abducted Safiev's financial advisor, 39-year-old Rita Pekler, who was pregnant at the time. Kadamovas had contacted Pekler pretending to be interested in real estate transaction. She was lured to his Sherman Oaks home where Mikhel, armed with a handgun and stun gun, was waiting with two other accomplices. When Pekler arrived, Mikhel restrained her and told her to contact Safiev. She made contact but Safiev told her he was too busy to meet. Pekler was then injected with diphenhydramine and strangled to death. Her body was also thrown off the Parrotts Ferry Bridge into the reservoir.

=== Alexander Umansky ===
The third victim was 35-year-old Alexander Umansky, who owned an automobile shop. In December 2001, Mikhel posed as a customer and pretended to need audio equipment installed in several cars. Umansky was lured to the home of Kadamovas where he was ambushed. Kadamovas sat him on a chair and handcuffed him. He had his keys, telephone, and wallet taken from him and was then questioned about his finances. Umansky was held captive in the house for three days, during which he was forced to call his brother and beg for money to secure his release. Kadamovas and Mikhel also sent the Umansky family a ransom note demanding nearly $235,000. The family contacted the FBI, where they were advised to pay a part of the ransom. They later received a call in which other family members were threatened, forcing them to pay the rest of the money. The money was transferred to an account in the United Arab Emirates. The calls then stopped.

After receiving the money, Kadamovas and Mikhel decided to kill Umansky. Mikhel duct-taped Umansky's mouth shut and placed a bag over his head, while Kadamovas pinned him down and pinched his nose shut. They then twisted a rope around his neck and strangled him to death from behind. They tied a weight plate around Umansky's body and put his corpse in Kadamovas’ van. They then drove to the New Melones Lake once again, where they threw Umansky's body off a bridge into the reservoir.

=== Nick Kharabadze and George Safiev ===
In January 2002, Kadamovas and Mikhel decided to target Safiev again, as he had returned from a trip and was back in Los Angeles. They planned to get him through his business partner, 29-year-old Nick Kharabadze. Kharabadze was contacted and asked to meet at a private club, which was actually the aquarium store owned by Kadamovas and Mikhel. Kharabadze arrived at the store and was then handcuffed to a chair by Mikhel. He was ordered to call Safiev and to convince him to come to the store. Safiev arrived and was taken prisoner. Both hostages were then taken to Kadamovas' house, where they made Safiev call another business partner of his and plead with him to transfer $940,000 to a foreign account. Kharabadze and Safiev remained imprisoned in the house for four days. While held captive, Kadamovas recorded Safiev's voice, planning to use the recordings to extort more money in the future. Mikhel eventually confirmed receipt of the $940,000, and then decided to kill the two men. They forced both the victims to drink vodka and then took them to the reservoir in two cars. Mikhel killed Kharabadze at the reservoir by placing a plastic bag over his head and tightening a plastic tie around his throat. A weight was then tied to Kharabadze's body and he was thrown off a bridge into the reservoir. The same thing then happened to Safiev.

== Investigation ==
Muscatel's body was found near the Parrotts Ferry Bridge by fishermen. An accomplice of Kadamovas and Mikhel, Ainar Altmanis, learned the FBI was investigating the case and were onto him. He decided to confess and cooperated with the FBI. He helped them find the bodies of the other four victims. The FBI wire-tapped the phones of Kadamovas and Mikhel and recorded them discussing ransom money. They also secured data from their cellphones. The data showed both men had been driving north on Highway 99 toward the New Melones Lake on the days each victim had died.

Other evidence linked the men to the murders. Muscatel's body had been carried to the edge of the Parrotts Ferry Bridge and was accidentally dropped on a curb where it had left blood stains. Kadamovas had also told a friend he had thrown a man off that bridge. Mikhel and an accomplice had used Umansky's debit card to withdraw money from an ATM which had been captured on video by a surveillance camera. Mikhel had also used Kharabadze's and Safiev's ATM cards to withdraw money and was caught on video from surveillance cameras once again. The FBI also searched the homes of both men and found physical evidence linking them to the crimes, including ransom notes and weapons.

An IRS investigator traced how the ransom payments were laundered. He discovered that the payments were laundered abroad before being deposited in accounts held by Kadamovas and Mikhel. In total, Kadamovas and Mikhel received over $1 million in ransom money from the kidnappings.

== Trial ==
Both men were detained at the Metropolitan Detention Center, Los Angeles. A federal grand jury indicted Kadamovas and Mikhel on multiple counts. The government filed a notice of intent to seek the death penalty against both men.

The guilty phase of this trial began in July 2006 and spanned five months. On January 17, 2007, the jury found both defendants guilty on all counts. On March 12, 2007, both men were sentenced to death. U.S. District Judge Dickran Tevrizian formally sentenced both men and called the murders brutal, adding that "the methods in which the individuals were killed, the perpetrators showed no mercy". The two were also ordered to forfeit over $1 million.

Ainar Altmanis, who admitted to participating in the kidnappings of Umansky, Kharabadze and Safiev, and that he took part in suffocating Umansky and Kharabadze, pleaded guilty to conspiracy to take hostages resulting in death and three counts of hostage taking resulting in death. In exchange for leading the police to the bodies and becoming a key witness against Kadamovas and Mikhel, Altmanis received a substantial assistance specification, allowing him to avoid an otherwise mandatory life sentence. Prosecutors recommended a 20-year sentence, but he was sentenced to 23 years and 4 months in prison. During the hearing, Altmanis apologized, saying in Russian through a court translator "I got totally confused in this life. The life of the person I have become, I do not want it. Please forgive me."

Natalya Solovyeva, the girlfriend of Kadamovas, pleaded guilty to conspiracy to take hostages resulting in death and two counts of hostage taking resulting in death. She had lured one of the victims to a bar, where he was abducted and forced to contact another man, who also became a victim. Solovyeva also received a substantial assistance specification in exchange for her cooperation. Prosecutors sought an 11-year sentence for Solovyeva, citing her assistance, but she was sentenced to 15 years in prison, with the judge saying that she had been promised a new BMW if she participated in the kidnappings and that two men would "probably be alive today" had she not taken part. During the hearing, Solovyeva apologized in Russian, saying through a translator "I would like to say over and over again how sorry I am for what I did. I am sorry for all the victims. I know I made a terrible choice I will regret for all my life." Prosecutor Susan DeWitt said that Solovyeva had been controlled and manipulated by Kadamovas. The two also had a child together. Ruven Umansky, the father of victim Alexander Umansky, said he didn't believe Solovyeva had been entirely honest. "She did until the end help abduct and kill people," he said. Solovyeva was released from prison on July 8, 2015.

Aleksejus Markovskis, who stood guard over two of the victims during their abductions, pleaded guilty to counts of conspiracy to take hostages resulting in death. In exchange for his cooperation, he was granted a substantial assistance specification. Markovskis was sentenced to 15 years in prison. After Solovyeva received a 15-year sentence, Markovskis had his sentence reduced to 12.5 years, since prosecutors said he was less culpable than her. He was released from prison in 2012.

Petro Krylov, the only other defendant to go to trial, was convicted of conspiracy to commit hostage taking in death and three counts of hostage taking resulting in death. Federal prosecutors sought a death sentence for Krylov, but his attorneys convinced the jury to spare his life by arguing that he'd participated in the murders out of duress. They said Mikhel and Kadamovas threatened to harm his family if he did not help them with their scheme. Krylov was sentenced to life without parole, and is serving his sentence at USP Canaan.

== Current status ==
Both Kadamovas and Mikhel are currently imprisoned at USP Terre Haute. The Ninth Circuit Court of Appeals upheld their death sentences in 2018. The two men lost their final appeal on October 7, 2019, but remained on death row. Their death sentences were commuted by President Joe Biden on December 23, 2024, and reduced to life imprisonment without the possibility of parole.

In January 2023, the American Civil Liberties Union of Indiana and the law firm Faegre Drinker filed a lawsuit on Kadamovas' behalf in federal court alleging that the conditions at the Special Confinement Unit of USP Terre Haute, where Kadamovas is being held, constituted cruel and unusual punishment.

== See also ==
- List of inmates at the United States Penitentiary, Terre Haute
- List of serial killers in the United States
