= Norodom Pongsoriya =

Cambodian Princess

Norodom Pongsoriya នរោត្តម ពង្ស់សូរិយា
- Princess of Cambodia
- Princess Norodom Pongsoriya in 2025
- Born: 25 November 1997 (age 28); Phnom Penh, Cambodia
- Spouse: Ing Seav Chhuon (m. 2025)
- House: Norodom
- Father: Norodom Chakrapong
- Mother: Norodom Men Keo Moniren
- Religion: Theravada Buddhism
- Occupation: Advisor to the Royal Secretariat of His Majesty the King

Styles of Norodom Pongsoriya
- Reference style: Her Royal Highness
- Spoken style: Your Royal Highness

Norodom Pongsoriya (Khmer: នរោត្តម ពង្ស់សូរិយា; born 25 November 1997) is a Cambodian Princess. She is the youngest daughter of Prince Norodom Chakrapong and Neak Moneang Norodom Men Keo Moniren. Her official title is Her Royal Highness Princess Norodom Pongsoriya (Khmer: ព្រះអង្គម្ចាស់ក្សត្រិយ៍ នរោត្តម ពង្ស់សូរិយា).

== Life and career ==
Her Royal Highness Princess Norodom Pongsoriya completed her high school education at the British International School of Phnom Penh in 2015. She later earned a Bachelor of Law in International Politics from the University of International Business and Economics (UIBE) in Beijing, China, in 2020. On 3 May 2022, she was appointed as Advisor to the Royal Secretariat of His Majesty the King of Cambodia, with a rank equivalent to an Under Secretary of State.
