= 1994 Cambodian coup d'état attempt =

On 2 July 1994, the government of Cambodia announced that it had prevented an attempted coup d'état. It alleged that Norodom Chakrapong and General Sin Song had led a rebel force from Prey Veng, but were stopped by government forces 20 miles from Phnom Penh, where they had intended to overthrow the government. Sin was arrested along with other conspirators. Norodom fled to France via Malaysia and Thailand, and went into exile.

== See also ==
- Samdech Euv Autonomous Zone
