= 2000 Cambodian coup d'état attempt =

Date	24 November 2000
Location	Phnom Penh, Cambodia
Result	Government victory

Belligerents
Government of Cambodia; (Cambodia) Royal Cambodian Armed Forces; (Cambodia) Cambodian National Police	Cambodian Freedom Fighters; Dissenting members of Royal Cambodian Armed Forces

Commanders and leaders
(Cambodia) Hun Sen (Cambodia) Tea Banh	Chhun Yasith

On 24 November 2000, the Cambodian Freedom Fighters unsuccessfully attempted to overthrow the government of Cambodia in a failed coup d'état. In what the group termed the "Operation Volcano" plot, dozens of rebels attacked government buildings in Phnom Penh in an attempt to depose Hun Sen's government.

== Planning ==
The Cambodian Freedom Fighters leader Chhun Yasith, a naturalised American citizen and former Cambodian refugee, traveled from his home in California to the Thai–Cambodian border in 1998 to meet with members of the Royal Cambodian Armed Forces who opposed Hun Sen and with former Khmer Rouge members to organise the plot. Chhun worked to raise funds in America, including aboard the Queen Mary, while conspirators in Cambodia provided weapons. Chhun organized the attack from a location in Thailand. The group planned to strike 291 targets and were able to raise US$50,000.

== Coup d'état attempt ==
On the morning of 24 November, around 100 armed individuals attacked the Ministry of Defence and the national police building. Authorities halted the attack before it reached the prime minister's residence. Thirty-eight conspirators, including two American citizens, were arrested. Hun Sen was attending an ASEAN Summit overseas and was not in the country. At least four people died and several dozen were wounded. The attacks did minimal damage and were defeated within a few hours. Chhun himself remained at the Thai border, intending to lead a new government if the coup was successful. Government spokesperson Khieu Kanharith described the attacks as terrorism and did not use the word coup.

== Aftermath and investigations ==
The Cambodian government convicted 38 people, including 2 American citizens, for the attack. Chhun was sentenced in absentia. He was later investigated in the United States and was arrested in June 2005 in connection with the violence. He was convicted in 2008 and sentenced to life imprisonment in 2010. In 2010, Hun Sen suggested that the opposition Sam Rainsy Party had had a role in the attempted coup.

== See also ==
- Bangkok Plot – 1950s conspiracy to topple Norodom Sihanouk
- 1997 Cambodian coup d'état – Self-coup by Hun Sen against co-premier Norodom Ranariddh
