= Jessie Con-ui =

American criminal

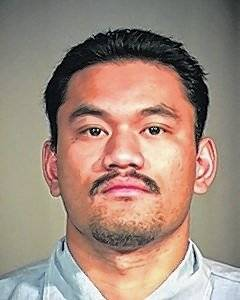
- Con-ui in 2005
- Born: January 17, 1977 (age 49); Philippines
- Other name: Chino
- Height: 5 ft 11 in (180 cm)
- Status: Incarcerated
- Allegiance: Mexican Mafia
- Convictions: Federal; First degree murder of a federal employee (18 U.S.C. §§ 1111 and 1114); Conspiracy to possess more than 5 kilograms of cocaine with intent to distribute (21 U.S.C. §§ 841 and 846); Possession of contraband in prison Arizona; First degree murder Money laundering Theft (2 counts)
- Penalty: Federal; Life imprisonment without the possibility of parole Arizona; Life imprisonment (minimum of 25 years)

Details
- Victims: Carlos Garcia; Eric Williams
- Date: August 25, 2002; February 25, 2013
- States: Arizona and Pennsylvania
- Imprisoned at: ADX Florence

Jessie Con-ui (born January 17, 1977) is a Filipino criminal who, while serving time in prison at United States Penitentiary, Canaan for multiple crimes including first-degree murder, killed a corrections officer. Con-ui had a lengthy criminal past that included dozens of charges for drug use, distribution, trafficking, aggravated assault, robbery, attempted murder and murder.

== Criminal past ==
Jessie Con-ui was raised in a slum in Manila, Philippines, before his mother married a U.S. serviceman and his family moved to Rome, New York, around 1986. He was first imprisoned in 1995, and was released on September 19, 2001.

In 2013, Con-ui was at Canaan serving an 11-year prison sentence stemming from a 2003 guilty plea for his role in a drug ring run by the New Mexican Mafia prison gang. He was also serving a concurrent 25 years to life after pleading guilty in June 2008 to first-degree murder in Arizona.

In that case, which occurred on August 25, 2002, Con-ui baited friend and fellow gang member Carlos Garcia into meeting him at a Phoenix laundromat. There, two men ambushed and shot Garcia, who managed to slip away before one of the men fired four rounds into his head. Later, in June 2003, Con-ui was arrested again in a drug trafficking operation.

Court documents claim Con-ui also agreed to or participated in several separate, uncharged incidents while incarcerated between 1999 and 2010, including stabbing another inmate with a homemade knife and assaulting another inmate with a food tray.

== Murder of Eric Williams ==
Con-ui began his incarceration at United States Penitentiary, Canaan in 2009. On February 25, 2013, Con-ui kicked corrections officer Eric Williams down a flight of stairs. Con-ui then attacked Williams for 11 minutes using two shanks, while other prisoners watched. Con-ui stabbed Williams 203 times, kicked him 11 times, and stomped his face, head, and neck six times. Video footage showed that more than 100 other inmates in the unit did nothing to intervene as the attack played out.

Finally, a fellow corrections officer who entered looking for Williams found Con-ui standing over Williams' body at the bottom of the stairs. First aid was administered by other corrections staff, but was unsuccessful. Williams' body was transported to an area hospital and Con-ui was immediately taken into custody. When Con-ui was asked by another officer why he killed Williams, he responded, "That fool disrespected me."

=== Murder trial ===
After Williams' murder, Con-ui was sent to ADX Florence, a super-maximum federal prison in Fremont County, Colorado, nicknamed the "Alcatraz of the Rockies", and placed under solitary confinement.

Con-ui's trial began on June 5, 2017 with opening statements held at the Federal Courthouse in Scranton, Pennsylvania. On the first day, an 11-minute video showing the graphic attack was played in front of the courtroom. Con-ui was seen covering his eyes with his hands, and the Williams family left prior to the video, stating "We didn't want to see our son, husband and friend like that."

Defense attorneys fully admitted to jurors that "Jessie is guilty of murder beyond all doubt" and focused on trying to keep him from being sentenced to death. On June 7, 2017, the jury found Con-ui guilty of first-degree murder. On July 10, the jury sentenced him to life in prison without the possibility for parole, despite 11 out of 12 jurors voting in favor of the death penalty, as current law requires a jury to unanimously impose the death penalty. The outcome infuriated Williams's father, who believed the verdict meant that his son's life was worth "absolutely nothing."

== Legislation ==
In May 2023, U.S. Representatives Matt Cartwright and Glenn Thompson, both of Pennsylvania, introduced Eric’s Law, a bill that would permit prosecutors to impanel a second jury for sentencing if the first jury in a federal death penalty case fails to reach a unanimous decision on a sentence, as it did in Con-ui's trial for Williams' murder. This is the fourth attempt to pass the bill, which was previously introduced by former Senator Pat Toomey in 2018 and 2021, and Senator Ted Cruz in February 2023.
