= 2025 Palm Springs fertility clinic bombing =

Car bombing in California, U.S.

- Location: 33°50′21″N 116°32′45″W; American Reproductive Centers in Palm Springs; 1199 North Indian Canyon Drive, Palm Springs, California, United States
- Date: May 17, 2025; 17 months ago 10:52 a.m. (PDT)
- Attack type: Domestic terrorism, suicide bombing, car bombing
- Weapon: Car bomb
- Deaths: 1 (the perpetrator)
- Injuries: 4
- Perpetrator: Guy Edward Bartkus
- Motive: Antinatalism; Anti-pro-life ideologies; Efilism; Promortalism
- Accused: Daniel Jongyon Park (committed suicide before trial)

On May 17, 2025, a car bombing occurred at a reproductive center in Palm Springs, California, United States, killing the perpetrator, and injuring four others. The explosion was described as one of the largest bombing investigations conducted by the Federal Bureau of Investigation (FBI) in Southern California since the Aliso Viejo package bombing that killed one person and seriously injured two others in 2018. The perpetrator was identified as Guy Edward Bartkus, a 25-year-old man from Twentynine Palms, California. He was the only person killed in the attack, and his motives stemmed from ideologies that included an "anti-pro-life ideology", as well as promortalist and antinatalist beliefs, together described by the DOJ as "the belief that individuals should not be born without their consent and that non-existence is best", and by journalists quoting the FBI as "nihilistic ideation". Other journalists associate the bombing with the fringe philosophy of efilism, the idea "that human life is an evolutionary mistake and that people should choose not to procreate".

Bartkus's alleged co-conspirator, Daniel Jongyon Park, who shared his ideologies, had been returned to the U.S. after fleeing to Poland, but died by apparent suicide while in custody. Before and after Park's death at the Metropolitan Detention Center in Los Angeles on June 24, 2025, investigators amassed evidence that he had purchased and shipped 270 pounds of ammonium nitrate to Bartkus's home for bomb-making. They also established that Park visited Bartkus in Twentynine Palms from January 25 to February 8, 2025, leading investigators to believe the two had experimented with bomb-making in Bartkus's garage during that period.

== Background ==
The American Reproductive Centers in Palm Springs is a fertility clinic operated by American Reproductive Centers, which provides in vitro fertilization, genetic testing, and egg donation services. Located near the Desert Regional Medical Center at 1199 North Indian Canyon Drive, it is the only full-service facility in the Coachella Valley.

== Bombing ==
At 10:52 a.m. PDT on May 17, 2025, a 2010 silver Ford Fusion sedan exploded in the parking lot behind a fertility clinic building. The bombing occurred outside the clinic's weekday business hours, and a doctor at the clinic reported that no staff members were harmed, nor were the clinic's essential medical operations. Videos posted online showed one of the clinic's buildings with a large hole in a wall and other damage to the structure. Nearby buildings were damaged and windows were shattered. A tripod and camera were found at the scene. The perpetrator was killed, and four other people were injured. Witnesses and video footage showed what looked like human remains on a road outside the building. The blast was felt more than 1 mile (1.6 km) away from the clinic.

Later that day, assistant director of the Los Angeles FBI field office Akil Davis confirmed that the explosion was caused by a car bomb and was being considered an "intentional act of terrorism". Davis also stated that the FBI had a person of interest but were not searching for a person at that time.

== Perpetrators and investigation ==
=== Bomber ===
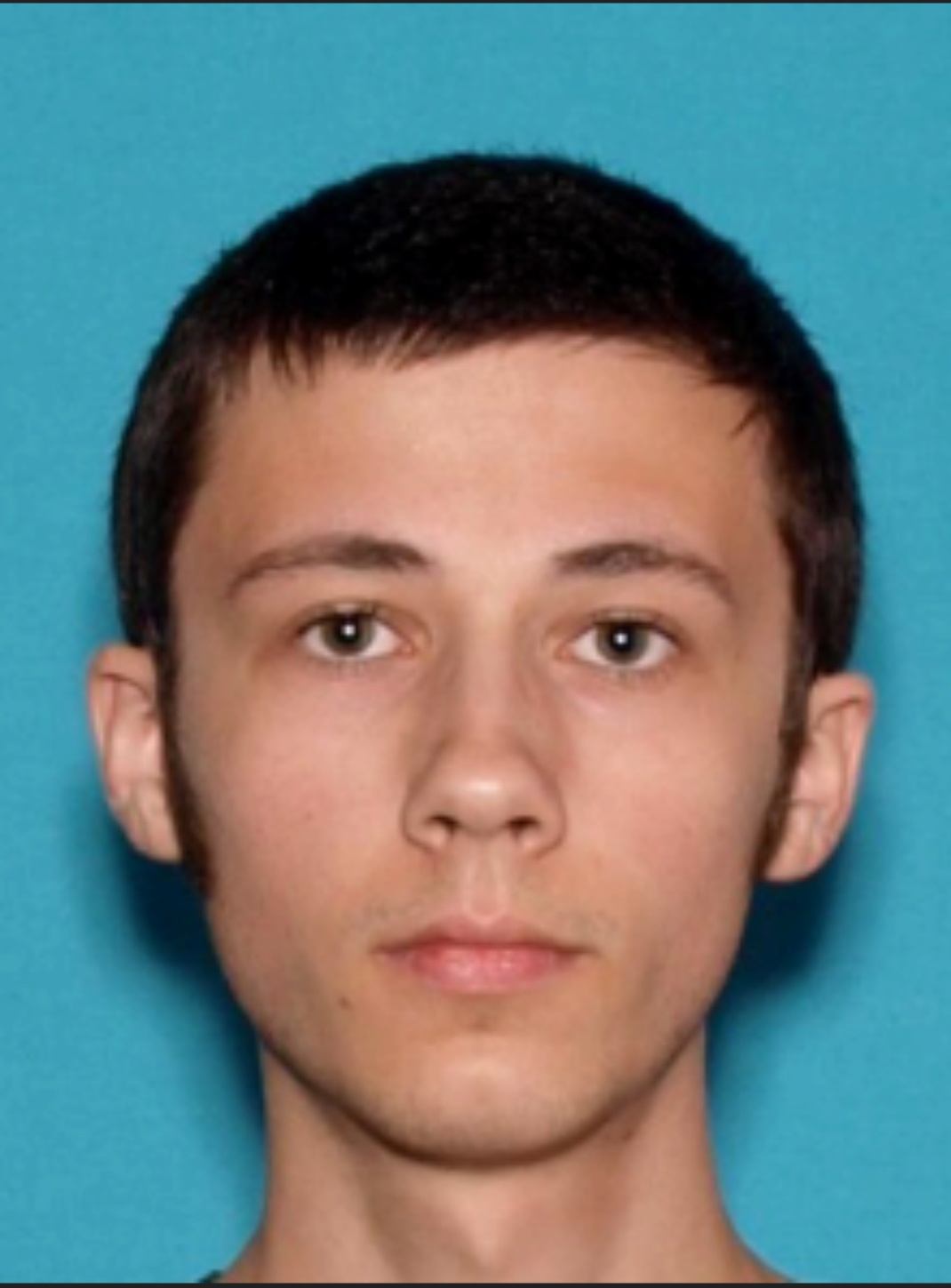
Photograph of Bartkus released by the FBI.

FBI officials identified 25-year-old Guy Edward Bartkus (September 1999–May 17, 2025), an unemployed former computer technician from Twentynine Palms, California, with childhood ties to Waterbury, Connecticut, as the suspected perpetrator of the bombing; they described him as having antinatalist and "nihilistic views". Bartkus reportedly identified himself as the perpetrator of the bombing in a video posted online, in which he described himself as a "pro-mortalist", saying in a manifesto that people did not give consent to exist. He also reportedly left a 30-minute audio recording in which he explained his reasoning for the attack. The FBI stated after the fact that Bartkus was not on their radar. During a news conference on May 18, FBI officials stated that Bartkus was the person killed during the attack.

Bartkus was raised in Yucca Valley, California. According to Bartkus's father, when Bartkus was a child, he would "tinker with small model rockets" and once accidentally set their home on fire while playing with matches. As a teen, Bartkus made "smoke bombs" and "stink bombs" but never anything "major". Bartkus later resided in Twentynine Palms after his parents divorced in 2012.

About a month prior to the bombing, Bartkus's friend in Fox Island, Washington, Sophie Tinney, died after she had allegedly convinced her boyfriend to kill her in her sleep. According to reports, Bartkus and Tinney had made a pact "that if one of them died, the other would soon follow." On a website Bartkus made before the bombing, he wrote that the main motivation for his decision to bomb the fertility clinic was suicide. Bartkus left a 30-minute audio recording explaining his motive for the alleged attack, saying "I figured I would just make a recording explaining why I've decided to bomb an IVF building, or clinic," he said. "Basically, it just comes down to I'm angry that I exist and that, you know, nobody got my consent to bring me here." Bartkus also stated his intent to start "a war against pro-lifers". Records later obtained by the FBI indicated that Bartkus used his phone and a generative AI chatbot to research how to make powerful explosives using ammonium nitrate.

The same day as the bombing, the FBI and San Bernardino County Sheriff's Department executed a search warrant and evacuated dozens of homes on or near Adobe Road in Twentynine Palms in connection to the investigation.

=== Co-conspirator ===
On the evening of June 3, 2025, FBI agents arrested a second man at New York City's John F. Kennedy International Airport after being extradited by Polish authorities. According to authorities, the individual whose extradition they had requested was 32-year-old Daniel Jongyon Park (December 1992–June 24, 2025) of Kent, Washington, who also had ties to the Seattle suburb of Lynnwood. Officials stated that he may have provided material support, though it was initially unclear how much he knew about the bombing, and later confirmed that he had participated in experiments related to making the bomb. Park was expelled from Poland to face prosecution in the United States.

Investigators later reported that Park spent two weeks visiting Bartkus in Twentynine Palms from January 25 to February 8 to run experiments in Bartkus's garage, after Park had sent an initial shipment of 180 pounds of ammonium nitrate to Bartkus earlier in January. Shortly before the bombing, Park bought another 90 pounds of the chemical and had it shipped to Bartkus; it arrived days before the attack. Park fled the United States to Warsaw, Poland, four days after the attack, where he remained until his extradition.

Based on their investigations into his travel and activities, federal investigators reported that Park, who shared Bartkus's ideologies, had been posting anti-natalist views on internet forums dating back to 2016. Following the investigation, authorities immediately searched Park's home in Kent, located 20 miles (32 km) south of Seattle, and found "an explosive recipe that was similar to the Oklahoma City bombing." According to a complaint, Park purchased ammonium nitrate online in several purchases between October 2022 and May 2025.

On June 24, 2025, Park died at the Metropolitan Detention Center in Los Angeles. According to authorities, he climbed onto an upper level of the detention center and jumped off a balcony, fatally injuring himself upon impact with the floor. He was found unresponsive during the morning hours and was taken to a nearby hospital where he was pronounced dead.

== Reactions ==
Bartkus's 75-year-old father told The New York Times that he hadn't seen his son since he left to live with his mother in Twentynine Palms in 2013. He said he was shocked when a relative told him that his son was implicated in the bombing. He described his son as a "good-hearted" young man who monitored special-needs children on school buses and as a "computer whiz" who built his own computers as early as age nine. He also described him as "impressionable" and noted that he often allowed himself to be "drawn in by friends who got him into trouble", mentioning a time when one of Bartkus's friends talked him into smashing cars at a demolition yard.

Brian Levin, founder of the Center for the Study of Hate and Extremism and professor emeritus at Cal State San Bernardino, opined that Bartkus appeared to be "part of a growing group of radicalized lone wolves influenced by dark websites", stating that they've seen mostly young men, including some related to past childhood incidents and a handful related to the rise of misandry, acting out "grievances as part of a broad movement sometimes or obscure ones towards an anti-life movement".

California Governor Gavin Newsom said he and his wife were "keeping everyone affected in [their] hearts".

Reddit banned its r/efilism subreddit, a community which had over 10,000 members, for violating its rules against inciting violence. Bartkus had directly mentioned several Reddit communities, including r/efilism, in his writings.

== See also ==
- 2025 Las Vegas Cybertruck explosion
- 2020 Nashville bombing
