= Alexanda Kotey =

Former British, now stateless ISIL terrorist and drug dealer

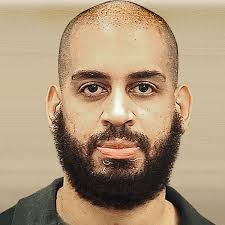
- Kotey in custody of the US Marshals Service
- Born: 13 December 1983 (age 42); Westminster, London, England
- Other name: Jihadi George
- Citizenship: Stateless person (since 2018); British (revoked 2018)
- Occupations: Drug dealer, terrorist
- Years active: 2012–2015
- Organization: The Beatles cell
- Children: 2
- Allegiance: Islamic State
- Convictions: Hostage taking resulting in death (18 U.S.C. § 1203) (4 counts); Conspiracy to commit hostage taking resulting in death (18 U.S.C. § 1203); Conspiracy to murder United States citizens abroad (18 U.S.C. §2339B); Conspiracy to provide material support to terrorists (18 U.S.C. § 2339A); Providing material support to a designated foreign terrorist organization (18 U.S.C. § 2339B)
- Penalty: Eight concurrent life sentences without the possibility of parole

Details
- Imprisoned at: ADX Florence, Colorado, US; FBP Register #11685-509

Alexanda Amon Kotey (born 13 December 1983), known as Jihadi George, is a stateless former British citizen, drug dealer, and terrorist serving life in prison at the ADX Florence supermax prison in Colorado for providing material support to the Islamic State and hostage taking resulting in death. Kotey has admitted to being one of the four "Jihadi Beatles" who took part in atrocities in the Syrian Civil War. He is serving eight concurrent life sentences without the possibility of parole.

Active in the Islamic State until 2015, Kotey was captured by the Syrian Democratic Forces along with El Shafee Elsheikh attempting to enter Turkey while fleeing from the collapse of the Islamic State in Syria. He has been designated a terrorist by the United States.

== Early life ==
Born in Britain to a Ghanaian father and Greek Cypriot mother, Kotey spent his youth in Shepherd's Bush. The Daily Telegraph reported that he was a supporter of Queens Park Rangers F.C. and dreamed of joining the team when he grew up. Syrian Democratic Forces holding him in detention say Kotey was engaged in a criminal career as a drug dealer in London prior to his radicalisation. He is believed to have converted to Islam in his early twenties and left his two young children behind in Britain.

== Time in the Islamic State ==
In 2014 and 2015, the Islamic State held dozens of European and North American captives, and the brutal conditions of their detention were widely reported. Four English-speaking ISIL fighters played a central role in the brutality. Their identities were initially either not known, or security officials did not make their identities known to the public, so the press dubbed the four as the Jihadi Beatles, with the most well-known being known as Jihadi John. Later Kotey was reported to have been one of the other three Beatles.

On 10 January 2017, the United States Department of State formally designated Kotey as a Specially Designated Global Terrorist under the authority of Executive Order 13224. This designation prohibited American citizens, financial institutions, and other American corporations, from having any financial dealings with him.

The US claims that Kotey was involved in beheadings and known for administering "exceptionally cruel torture methods", including "electronic shocks". He was accused of acting as an ISIL recruiter and being responsible for inducing several other British extremists to join ISIL. Kotey has denied being a member of "the Beatles", but admitted to having joined the ISIL terrorist group.

ISIL-controlled areas of Syria and Iraq underwent a steady erosion in 2015, 2016 and 2017, with their remaining enclaves collapsing in late 2017 and early 2018. On 24 January 2018, Kotey and El Shafee Elsheikh, a friend from London who was also reported to have been one of the Jihadi Beatles, were captured in Syria while attempting to flee to Turkey.

== Prosecution ==
The Independent reported that the United Kingdom government was considering agreeing that Kotey and Elsheikh could be transferred to the Guantanamo detention camps. Detention in Guantanamo might mean indefinite detention without charge; if transferred to US custody for a civilian trial and convicted, they would likely be detained at the Supermax prison near Florence, Colorado. Another option under consideration was trial at the International Court in The Hague. Tobias Ellwood of the UK Ministry of Defence had argued that transfer to Guantanamo was inappropriate.

In March 2018, Kotey and El Shafee Elsheikh complained that their British citizenship had "illegally" been withdrawn (judges have previously found the UK in breach of international law when stripping citizenship from terror suspects who are not dual nationals), leaving them stateless and at risk of "rendition and torture". UK security minister Ben Wallace confirmed in July 2018 that both men had been stripped of their UK citizenship.

While the UK will not normally extradite suspects if they might be subject to the death penalty, in July 2018 it was reported that British Home Secretary Sajid Javid had written to the US attorney general about the case, saying "I am of the view that there are strong reasons for not requiring a death penalty assurance in this specific case, so no such assurances will be sought." Javid said that the decision was for this specific case, not a change to the government's support of the global abolition of the death penalty. The BBC security correspondent said that the UK was opposed to the controversial military prison in Guantanamo Bay: if the two were sent there, the UK would not share intelligence for the trial, but if they were to go on criminal trial in the US, then the UK would.

On 9 October 2019, Charlie Savage, of The New York Times, reported that Kotey and El Shafee Elsheikh were in the process of being transferred from Kurdish territories to custody of the US. On 7 October 2020, Kotey and El Shafee Elsheikh were brought to the United States to face charges of beheading western hostages.

In September 2021, it was announced that, as per a plea agreement, Kotey would plead guilty to all of the charges against him and would spend the rest of his life in prison, initially in the US and, after 15 years, in the United Kingdom. On 2 September 2021, The New York Times reported that Kotey had pleaded guilty to 'multiple charges, including conspiracy to commit hostage taking resulting in death and conspiracy to murder U.S. citizens outside the United States'.

On 29 April 2022, Kotey was sentenced to life in prison at the federal courthouse in Alexandria, Virginia for the torture and murder of four American hostages in Syria.

The federal judge presiding over his case, T.S. Ellis III, recommended that Kotey be placed in a lesser-secure prison for his mental and physical health. On 31 August 2022, Kotey was transferred to the custody of the Federal Bureau of Prisons and moved to United States Penitentiary, Canaan. Despite Ellis's recommendation, Kotey was transferred to ADX Florence on 22 September 2023 with Elsheikh who was transferred there on 3 March.
