= Chhun Yasith =

Cambodian American

Chhun Yasith (also dubbed "Cambodian Moses") is a Cambodian American man who established the Cambodian Freedom Fighters paramilitary group, and led a failed coup d’état in Cambodia in 2000.

== Biography ==
Yasith left Cambodia in the early 1980s, amid the disarray following the Vietnamese invasion that deposed the Khmer Rouge régime from power. He emigrated to the United States in 1982 and became a tax accountant in Long Beach, California. In 1988, he returned to Cambodia and joined the opposition Sam Rainsy Party. He left the party a year later after he came to believe that the non-violent opposition was ineffective.

In 1998, he established the Cambodian Freedom Fighters (CFF) an anti-communist organization and serves as its President. The group's aim was to unseat the government of Prime Minister Hun Sen, a former Khmer Rouge commander who had defected to Vietnam in the 1970s and returned to Cambodia with the Vietnamese troops in 1979. The group—controlled by Chhun from a base in Thailand—carried out a series of small attacks. On November 24, 2000, dozens of rebels armed with rockets and grenades attacked government buildings in Phnom Penh. Several people were killed in this attack and several others injured. Following the attack, dozens of people were arrested and jailed. Chhun was tried in absentia by a Phnom Penh court. On June 22, 2001, the Cambodian Criminal Court found Yasith guilty and sentenced him to life in prison on charges of conspiring to commit terrorism, along with Richard Kiri Kim and Thong Samien.

The government of Cambodia issued an international Interpol warrant for Chhun Yasith's arrest.

On April 17, 2008, Chhun Yasith was convicted in a U.S. court of masterminding the failed coup attempt in 2000. He was sentenced in Los Angeles on June 22, 2010, to life in prison without the possibility of parole.

As of 2026, Chhun Yasith remains incarcerated at the USP Canaan.

== See also ==
- General Vang Pao – former major general in the Royal Lao Army. Leader of the Hmong American community in the United States, arrested for his alleged plot to overthrow the Communist government of Laos.
- Government of Free Vietnam
