= Metropolitan Detention Center, Los Angeles =

Federal prison in Los Angeles, California

Coordinates: 34.0538°N 118.2382°W

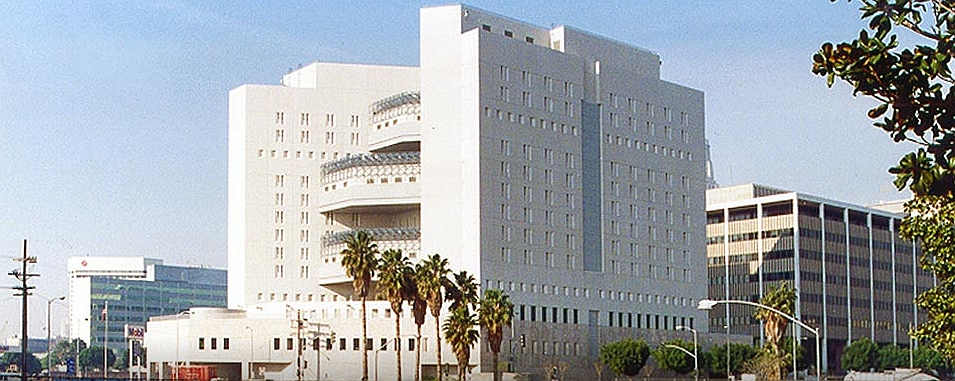
- Interactive map of Metropolitan Detention Center, Los Angeles
- Location: Los Angeles, California
- Status: Operational
- Security class: Administrative facility (all security levels)
- Population: 980
- Opened: December 1988; 37 years ago
- Managed by: Federal Bureau of Prisons

The Metropolitan Detention Center, Los Angeles (MDC Los Angeles) is a prison in downtown Los Angeles, California, which holds male and female inmates prior to and during court proceedings, as well as inmates serving short sentences. It is operated by the Federal Bureau of Prisons, a division of the United States Department of Justice.

== History ==
The 272,000-square-foot (25,300 m^{2}) prison opened in December 1988 with a cost of $36 million (equivalent to $98 million in 2025), making Los Angeles the fifth U.S. city with a downtown federal prison. MDC Los Angeles had a distinct design, referring to housing areas as rooms rather than cells and not using iron bars on its cell doors. It had a special design using plate glass windows, balconies, and atriums. Kim Murphy of the Los Angeles Times wrote that the building has "more the look of a downtown office building than a prison." It was the first BOP prison to completely ban smoking.

Prior to the opening of MDC Los Angeles, Federal Correctional Institution, Terminal Island, housed the Los Angeles area pretrial inmates. This situation caused overcrowding at FCI Terminal Island.

The opening of MDC Los Angeles allowed prisoners whose trials are pending to be housed near Federal Court, ending the time-consuming process of transporting hundreds of prisoners a week back and forth down the Harbor Freeway each day court is in session.

When the facility first opened, federal court proceedings took place at the nearby Spring Street Courthouse, located two blocks away. In 1992, a second federal courthouse opened inside the Roybal Building built adjacent to MDC Los Angeles. In 2016, the federal courts at Spring Street relocated to the new First Street Courthouse, located six blocks away.

== Programs ==
Various services are available to inmates at MDC Los Angeles, including drug treatment and education programs, Alcoholics Anonymous and Narcotics Anonymous meetings, GED and ESL classes, and correspondence classes. Inmates may meet with a chaplain or a priest upon request.

== Notable inmates (current and former) ==
Inmate Name	Register Number	Status	Details
Jose Cabrera Sablan	90470-011	Died in custody on November 14, 2018.	Pleaded guilty to murdering Federal Correctional Officer Jose Rivera at the United States Penitentiary, Atwater on June 20, 2008; accomplice James Leon Guerrero also pleaded guilty and is serving a life sentence.
Domino Harvey	27481-112	Released from custody on May 31, 2005.	Accused of trafficking methamphetamine, released for pretrial purposes but died a month after posting bail from an overdose.
Vianna Roman	64108-112	Released from custody on October 10, 2025.	Daughter and son-in-law of imprisoned Mexican Mafia kingpin Danny Roman; indicted in 2012 for allegedly receiving orders from Roman and directing gang activities which include extortion, robbery, drug trafficking and murder.
Aaron Soto	64072-112	Released from custody on February 27, 2018.	Daughter and son-in-law of imprisoned Mexican Mafia kingpin Danny Roman; indicted in 2012 for allegedly receiving orders from Roman and directing gang activities which include extortion, robbery, drug trafficking and murder.
Anthony Pellicano	21568-112	Transferred to FCI Terminal Island. Released from custody on March 22, 2019.	Private investigator and fixer to Hollywood celebrities including Michael Jackson. Sentenced to 30 months in prison for possession of explosives as well as 15 years for wiretapping, racketeering, conspiracy, and wire fraud.
Paul F "Max Hardcore" Little	44902-112	Transferred to FCI La Tuna. Released from custody on July 19, 2011.	American porn producer, director and performer. Convicted on obscenity charges and sentenced to 46 months in prison.
Stephen William Beal	76346-112	Transferred to USP Victorville. Serving a life sentence.	Convicted for bombing an Aliso Viejo spa, killing his ex-girlfriend.
Irv Rubin	20965-112	Died in custody on November 13, 2002.	Former chairman of the Jewish Defense League. Arrested in 2001 for allegedly plotting to bomb the office of US congressman Darrell Issa and the King Fahd Mosque. Rubin committed suicide in 2002 while awaiting trial.
Paul Anthony Ciancia	67089-112	Transferred to FCI Atlanta. Serving a life sentence.	Perpetrator of the 2013 Los Angeles International Airport shooting, in which Ciancia killed one TSA agent and injured several other people.
Iouri Mikhel	23675-112	Transferred to USP Terre Haute. Sentenced to death on March 12, 2007. Commuted to life in prison without the possibility of parole on December 23, 2024.	Soviet-American serial killers convicted of kidnapping five people for ransom between 2001 and 2002. Mikhel and Kadamovas murdered the five victims and dumped their bodies in Yosemite National Park.
Jurijus Kadamovas	21050-112	Transferred to USP Terre Haute. Sentenced to death on March 12, 2007. Commuted to life in prison without the possibility of parole on December 23, 2024.	Soviet-American serial killers convicted of kidnapping five people for ransom between 2001 and 2002. Mikhel and Kadamovas murdered the five victims and dumped their bodies in Yosemite National Park.
Lil Durk	43251-511	Found not guilty.	Rapper accused in a murder-for-hire plot which injured fellow rapper Quando Rondo and killed his cousin.
Tahawwur Hussain Rana	22829-424	Served a 14 year sentence; released on April 8, 2025 and extradited to India the following day.	Pakistani-Canadian businessman accused of planning the 2008 Mumbai attacks, which killed 166 people. Rana was convicted in the United States of providing material support for the terrorist group Lashkar-e-Taiba. After serving his sentence in the United States, he was extradited to India, where he faces the death penalty.
Ridge Alkonis	47049-007	Released from custody January 12, 2024.	Former United States Navy officer who pleaded guilty to negligent driving in a Japanese court after killing two Japanese citizens in a car accident. Alkonis was sentenced to three years in prison, with half to be served in Japan and half in the United States, but he was released without conditions shortly after being transferred to the United States.
Daniel Jongyon Park	87519-511	Died in custody on June 24, 2025.	Accused of supplying ammonium nitrate used in the 2025 Palm Springs fertility clinic bombing. Park attempted to flee to Poland, where he was arrested, but he committed suicide shortly after being returned to the United States.

== See also ==
- List of U.S. federal prisons
- Federal Bureau of Prisons
- Incarceration in the United States
