= 2013 Los Angeles International Airport shooting =

Terrorist attack in California, U.S.

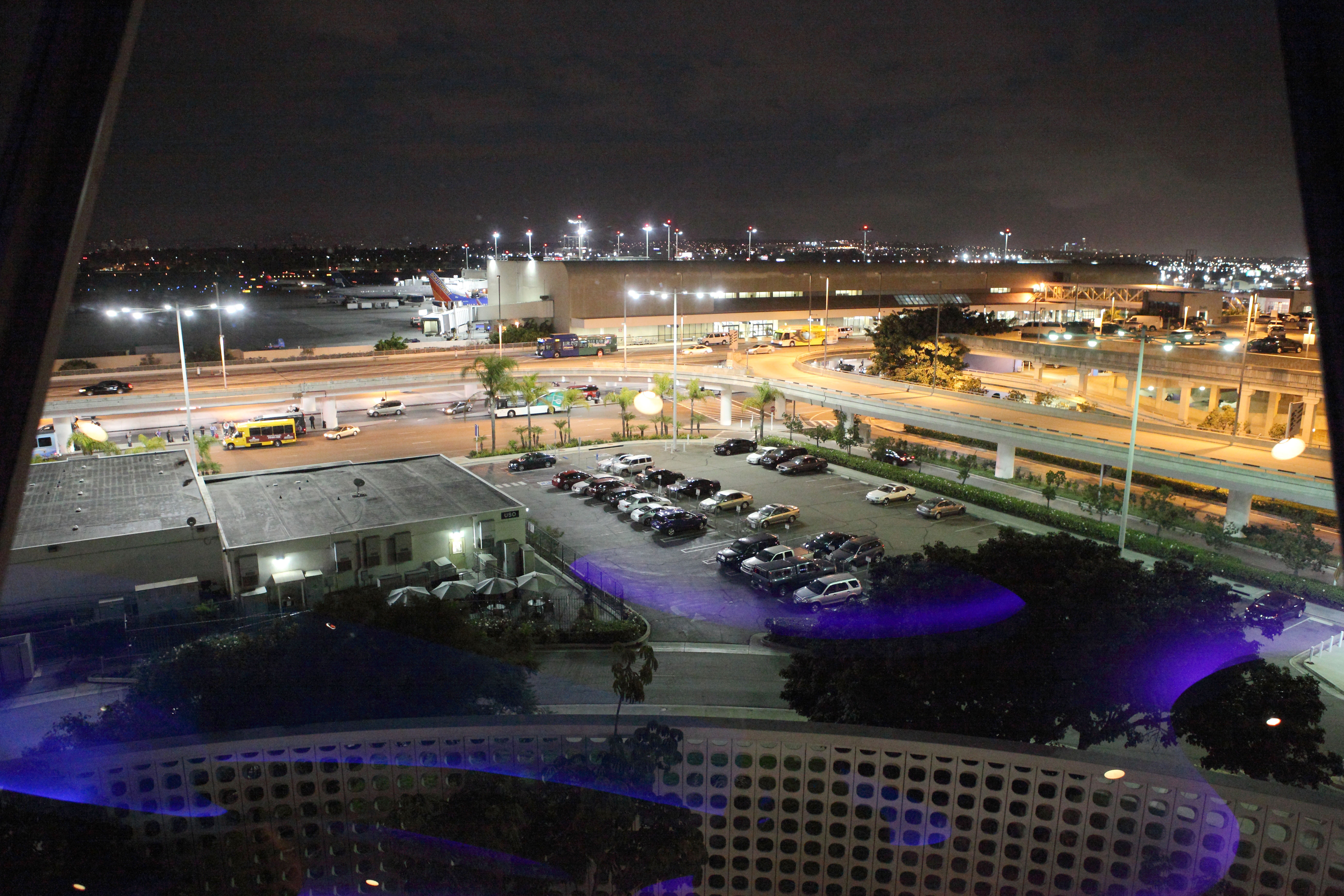
- LAX on October 28, 2013, a few days prior to the attack
- Location: Terminal 3 at Los Angeles International Airport (LAX); Los Angeles, California, U.S.
- Date: November 1, 2013 c. 9:18 – 9:25 a.m. (PST)
- Target: TSA officers
- Attack type: Mass shooting; domestic terrorism
- Weapon: .223-caliber Smith & Wesson M&P-15
- Deaths: 1
- Injuries: 7 (4 from gunfire, including the perpetrator)
- Perpetrator: Paul Anthony Ciancia

On November 1, 2013, a mass shooting occurred at around 9:20 a.m. PDT in Terminal 3 of Los Angeles International Airport. 23-year-old Paul Anthony Ciancia opened fire with a rifle, killing a Transportation Security Administration officer and injuring several other people.

== Shooting ==
On the morning of Friday, November 1, 2013, Ciancia entered Terminal 3 of Los Angeles International Airport after being dropped off there by a roommate. He was carrying a bag filled with a semiautomatic, .223-caliber Smith & Wesson M&P-15 rifle, five 30-round magazines, and hundreds of additional rounds of ammunition contained in boxes. Walking up to a TSA checkpoint, he pulled the rifle out of the bag and opened fire, shooting TSA officer Gerardo Hernandez in the chest at point-blank range. He then went up an escalator, but returned to the checkpoint and shot Hernandez again after seeing him move.

Ciancia then moved up the escalator into the TSA screening area, passed the checkpoint area, and moved farther into the secure airside area of the terminal. At the time, many people fled by going into the concourse area or through doors leading into the airfield. Others ran into the restaurant where staff locked the metal security doors and ordered customers to take cover under the restaurant's tables. Entering the concourse area, Ciancia continued firing, wounding two TSA agents and a passenger. People hiding in the concourse area then fled the terminal through street exits. One witness, interviewed on CNN, said the gunman was walking, not running, down the terminal's concourse, and actor Tim Daly reported hearing shooting while in Virgin America's "The Loft" lounge. According to several witnesses, Ciancia repeatedly asked passersby if they were TSA agents and then moved on without shooting when they said no. At 9:20 a.m., the first calls to 9-1-1 were made, followed by the arrival of the first LAX officers two minutes later.

Ciancia made it as far as the end of the terminal in the food court, where LAX police officers confronted him and shot him in a gunfight. He was wounded four times by gunshots and captured. He was taken to the hospital in an ambulance. Police were unsure whether the terminal was safe for paramedics to enter, and as a result TSA Officer Hernandez did not receive medical care for 33 minutes after being shot, despite bleeding heavily about 20 feet from an exit. Eventually Officer Hernandez was put in a wheelchair and removed from the terminal. Witnesses saw a rifle with three magazines nearby on the floor of the waiting area near gates 35 and 36.

== Victims ==
=== Fatality ===
The gunman shot TSA Officer Gerardo I. Hernandez, age 39, at the airport. He was shot 12 times, consisting of 6 shots to his lower back and buttocks, and severe wounds to vital places, including the heart and spinal cord. In all, 40 bullet fragments were removed from his body. Hernandez was transported to Harbor-UCLA Medical Center, where he was pronounced dead around 11am, although officials from the Los Angeles County coroner's office asserted that he was dead within a few minutes of being shot. Hernandez is the first TSA officer in the history of the agency to have been killed on the job. A behavior detection officer, Hernandez had immigrated to the United States from El Salvador at age 15. According to an autopsy report, Hernandez was shot 12 times, with his heart being grazed several times and his bladder and intestines pierced. More than 40 bullet fragments were also lodged in his body, and he died within two to five minutes after being shot.

=== Injuries ===
Seven victims were treated at the scene. Three victims were wounded by gunfire, including two TSA officers, identified as 54-year-old James Speer and 36-year-old Tony Grigsby; Grigsby was shot in the foot. The third shooting victim was 29-year-old Brian Ludmer, a schoolteacher from Lake Forest, Illinois, who was shot in the leg. Six victims were transported to area hospitals, including three men, two of whom had suffered gunshot wounds, who were treated at Ronald Reagan UCLA Medical Center. Some of the injuries were confirmed to have been caused by other factors, not gunshot wounds.

Law enforcement officers shot Ciancia four times, including wounds in the head and leg. They subdued him in the food court area of Terminal 3 and kicked the rifle away from him. He was then transported to Ronald Reagan UCLA Medical Center, where he was initially in critical condition. Video from KCAL-TV shows Ciancia brought into the hospital from an ambulance, surrounded by multiple police officers, while handcuffed to a gurney.

== Perpetrator ==
Perpetrator Paul Anthony Ciancia (born March 1990) was 23 at the time of the attack. An unemployed car mechanic, he lived in the Sun Valley neighborhood of Los Angeles and grew up in Pennsville, New Jersey. In 2008, Ciancia graduated from Salesianum School in Wilmington, Delaware.

After the shooting ended, Ciancia was found to be carrying a note stating that he "wanted to kill TSA" officers and describing them as "pigs". It also mentioned "fiat currency" and "NWO", the latter likely being a reference to the New World Order conspiracy theory.

On the day of the shooting and before Ciancia was identified as the suspect, the LAPD went to his residence when concerned family members wanted to file a missing persons report after not having heard from him after repeated attempts to make contact. Ciancia was not at home at the time and his roommates told them that he had been there earlier in the day. The police left and could not file a report, because they had no confirmation on where he was. Ciancia had talked about taking his own life a few days earlier.

According to reports, on the day of the shooting, Ciancia burst into the room of an unidentified roommate and demanded him to drive him to the airport immediately, and the roommate, not sensing any intention of committing violence, agreed to do so. Days prior to the shooting, Ciancia had begun asking for a ride to the airport so he could fly back to New Jersey, claiming that his father was ill.

== Aftermath ==
=== Immediate reaction ===
Los Angeles Airport Police evacuated several terminals and searched for any other possible suspects. They searched in cars with armed officers and a bomb-sniffing dog at the nearby parking garages that are connected to airport terminals by pedestrian bridges. The Federal Aviation Administration grounded all outbound flights at the airport. Runways 24L and 24R were shut down. Terminals 1, 2, and 3 were shut down and the 300 passengers were evacuated from these terminals to the Tom Bradley International Terminal for questioning, and then were re-screened as they exited the international terminal. Airlines diverted some flights to other airports in the Greater Los Angeles Area. Most were directed to Ontario International Airport, and others to Long Beach Airport. Most of the diverted flights were originally scheduled to taxi to gates at Terminals 1, 2, and 3. Over 1,500 flights and 171,000 passengers were affected by the incident.

Later that afternoon, Ciancia's family released a statement, saying that they were "shocked and numbed" by his actions and also expressing their sympathies to the family of Gerardo Hernandez, and also to the wounded victims.

=== Security and emergency response ===
The shooting reignited ongoing debates over the effectiveness of airport security, with some commentators suggesting the arming of TSA officers with guns. In response to these suggestions, TSA Administrator John S. Pistole commented, "[Officer safety] is something we have dealt with really since the standup of TSA, knowing that in many respects TSA employees are the first line of defense when it comes to airport security particularly. And so given this tragedy, we will obviously look at and review our policies with airport police both here at LAX and of course around the country." Tom Ridge, the former secretary for the United States Department of Homeland Security, criticized the suggestion of arming TSA officers, calling it a "big mistake" and saying, "You have literally hundreds and hundreds of armed police officers roaming every major airport in America. And I don't think arming another 40 or 50 or 60 thousand people ... would have prevented this incident from happening."

An investigation by several agencies has been opened to determine whether paramedics should have been allowed inside the terminal much earlier to aid Hernandez and the other wounded victims. The Los Angeles Police Department has also opened an investigation into an officer who allegedly improperly told emergency responders that Hernandez was dead when he was checked five minutes after the shooting ended.

On January 22, 2014, it was revealed that the two unarmed officers assigned to the area had gone on a break at the time of the shooting, without carrying out the requirement of informing a dispatcher, with one being at the bathroom of an adjacent terminal. In response to the new details, airport police union chief Marshall McClain stated that the two officers were still capable of quickly responding to the shooting, adding, "I want to make sure that in any terminal, there's always somebody there, that a bathroom break doesn't result in somebody, even for a few minutes, being out of the action."

On March 18, 2014, a released 83-page report highlighted flaws in various divisions and current systems of the airport, adding that emergency response had been hindered by "communication problems and poor coordination". The report also laid out an estimated 50 recommendations, including one for training airport police to be trained in tactical medicine and for training paramedics to enter more dangerous zones earlier with the protection of law enforcement. In addition, it was critical of the current airport emergency management program, saying that it was "not well-defined or widely understood across the agency, or perhaps even respected". It was also reported that at the time of the shooting, the airport's lower-level employees was not trained for an evacuation and did not know what to do or how to help passengers. Jeffrey David Cox Sr., the president of the American Federation of Government Employees representing these workers, called the lack of coordination "absolutely unacceptable" and criticized the report as being incomplete and failing to note the two airport officers who were not on their shifts at the time of the shooting.

On June 6, 2014, Rep. Richard Hudson (R, NC-8) introduced the Gerardo Hernandez Airport Security Act of 2014 in response to the findings about events of the shooting. The bill would have directed the Assistant Secretary of Homeland Security, acting through the Transportation Security Administration, to undertake a variety of activities aimed at enhancing security at airports where TSA performs oversees security-related activities. The bill would also have required TSA to verify that all such airports had plans in place for responding to security threats and to provide technical assistance as necessary to improve such plans. H.R. 4802 also would have required TSA to disseminate information on best practices for addressing security threats and ensure that all screening personnel have received training in how to handle potential shooting threats. Finally, H.R. 4802 would have required the Department of Homeland Security's Office of Cybersecurity and Communications to report to the Congress on the capacity of law enforcement, fire, and medical response teams to communicate and respond to security threats at airports. H.R. 4802 passed the House on July 22, 2014, but did not advance in the U.S. Senate. The following year, Rep. John Katko of New York introduced the similar bill H.R. 720, which did pass both houses of Congress and was enacted as Public Law 114-50.

=== Charges and prosecution ===
On November 2, 2013, federal prosecutors charged Ciancia with murder of a federal officer and committing violence at an international airport. Ciancia also faced additional federal and/or state charges, including attempted murder in relation to the two men who were wounded by gunfire. On November 19, 2013, Ciancia was released from hospital care after recovering from his gunshot wounds; he was taken into custody by agents from the United States Marshals Service.

On December 5, 2013, Ciancia appeared for the first time in court, where he was remanded without bail because he posed a threat to the community. On December 17, 2013, a federal grand jury indicted Ciancia on 11 counts, including first-degree murder. This raised the possibility that he could have received the death penalty if he was convicted. The indictment described how the offence involved substantial planning and premeditation to cause the death of a person and to commit an act of terrorism.

On December 26, 2013, Ciancia pleaded not guilty to the charge of first-degree murder. On March 3, 2014, a judge ordered that Ciancia be moved from a treatment facility at a San Bernardino County jail to a federal detention facility in Los Angeles. His case was initially set for trial on February 11, 2014, but this was then postponed several times and December 8, 2014.

In January 2015, federal prosecutors announced they would seek the death penalty against Ciancia. On January 5, 2015, it was announced that Ciancia's trial was projected to begin on February 23, 2016.

On September 6, 2016, Ciancia pleaded guilty in exchange for a life sentence. On November 7, 2016, Ciancia was sentenced to life imprisonment without the possibility of parole plus 60 years. As of 2026 he is incarcerated in the United States Penitentiary, Allenwood.

== See also ==
- 1996 Timika shooting
- 2017 Fort Lauderdale airport shooting
- 2002 Los Angeles International Airport shooting
