= Cambodian Freedom Fighters =

Anti-communist political and paramilitary organization

- Leaders: Chhun Yasith; Richard Kiri Kim; Thong Samien
- Dates active: 21 October 1998 – 2001
- Headquarters: Phnom Penh and Punset
- Active regions: Phnom Penh Cambodia
- Ideology: Anti-communism; Sihanoukism; Monarchism; Aristocracy; Royalism; Conservatism
- Political position: Centre-right
- Status: Inactive
- Size: ~20,000 volunteers (Cambodia); ~500 volunteers (In the United States) claimed
- Part of: FUNCINPEC (suspected)
- Wars: Aftermath of the 1997 Cambodian coup

The Cambodian Freedom Fighters (CFF; Khmer: ចលនាកងទ័ពសេរីជាតិកម្ពុជា, romanized: Châlônéa kângtoăp séri chéatĕ Kâmpŭchéa) is an anti-communist political and paramilitary organization that was established on 21 October 1998 by Chhun Yasith at Poipet near the Cambodian-Thai border. Their headquarters are in Long Beach, California, United States. It was incorporated and registered at the Californian Secretary of State's office as a political organization in June 1999, and aims "to fight against communists to protect the interests of Cambodian people." The CFF claim to have 500 members in the United States and up to 20,000 supporters in the Kingdom of Cambodia. The group orchestrated a 2000 Cambodian coup d'état attempt.

== History and attacks ==
The military branch of the CFF emerged in November 1998, in the wake of political violence that saw many influential Cambodian leaders flee and the Cambodian People's Party assume power. With the objective of overthrowing the government, the group is led by a Cambodian-American, a former member of the opposition Sam Rainsy Party, includes Cambodian-Americans based in Thailand and the United States and former soldiers from the separatist Khmer Rouge, Royal Cambodian Armed Forces, and various conservative political factions. In the wake of the violence, more than 200 people, including Richard Kiri Kim, were arrested by the Cambodian police.

On 19 September 2000, a grenade was thrown by two men on a motorcycle at a phone booth. Four people were killed and nine injured in the attack. Although they did not claim the incident, the government saw the CFF as suspects.

On 24 November 2000, two attacks were registered eight people were killed and at least fourteen wounded when as many as seventy anti-government rebels stormed state offices and battled security forces in Phnom Penh, Cambodia. The rebels threw grenades and used AK-47's in an exchange of fire with soldiers and police outside the Ministry of Defense and Cabinet buildings, and ten men launched an assault on a military barracks approximately 15 kilometers (nine miles) west of the capital. There were no reports of casualties or damage. Police believed that the attacks were perpetrated by the anti-government group, the Cambodian Freedom Fighters.

After the attacks Cambodian courts have jailed several dozen people for their roles in the attacks in trials that have been widely criticized as unfair. During the arrests of CFF suspects after the November 2000 raids, Cambodian human rights groups and opposition political parties accused the Government of arbitrarily arresting and jailing several legitimate party figures on charges of being CFF members. In December 2000, Human Rights Watch reported that, within two weeks after the November attacks, over 200 people had been arrested all over Cambodia, most without a warrant (6 December 2000). "Many of those arrested or detained are affiliated with the royalist Funcinpec Party of the opposition Sam Rainsy Party (SRP)", Human Rights Watch reported (6 December 2000). In its 2002 annual report on human rights practices in Cambodia, Human Rights Watch stated that another 50 CFF suspects had been arrested in September 2001 in the provinces and Phnom Penh, and that "human rights groups expressed concern that the government's response to the CFF's November 2000 attack in Phnom Penh could be used as a pretext to intimidate opposition party members, particularly as the commune election campaign began to get underway".On 22 June 2001, the Cambodian Criminal Court handed down their verdict on the Cambodian Freedom Fighters’ attack of 24 November 2000. An Mao, Nou Saron, and three Cambodian-Americans (Richard Kiri Kim, Thong Samien, and Chhun Yasith) were sentenced to life in prison on charges of conspiring to commit terrorism. Chhun Yasith and Thong Samien were tried in absentia. Yasith was later sentenced to life in prison by a federal court in the United States.

A year later the 1 November 2001, a series of bombings that included four improvised explosive devices which detonated near the governor's office, other near a deputy governor's home and other more near in the provincial prison in Pursat, Pursat province, Cambodia. No one was injured and there was only minor damage as a result of the explosion. Authorities suspect the involvement of CFF.

Twenty-four other men and one woman were found guilty of various charges and given prison terms ranging from three to 20 years. Among them were two prominent former Khmer Rouge commanders, Seng Narin and Tumlap Mil, who each received 15 years in prison.

== Politics ==
The Cambodian Freedom Fighters have chosen not to participate in the election process in Cambodia because they state Prime Minister Hun Sen belonged to the ultra-left Khmer Rouge and he has rigged the election process in Cambodia. They have chosen to remove Hun Sen's government militarily because they believe he and his regime are guilty of corruption in the election process in collaboration with the Communist Vietnamese that placed Hun Sen in power in 1989.

In 2008, Chhun Yasith, founder of the Cambodian Freedom Fighters, was tried and convicted in the U.S., in relation to masterminding the 2000 coup attempt. CFF's exact strength is unknown, but totals probably never has exceeded 500 armed fighters. CFF operates in Northeastern Cambodia near the Thai border. Its U.S. based leadership collects funds from the Cambodian-American community.

== Finances ==
The Cambodian Freedom Fighters collect operating funds through active solicitation of donations from the Cambodian-American community in the United States and Cambodian refugees in Europe.

== See also ==
- 1997 clashes in Cambodia
- List of paramilitary organizations
- Vang Pao
