= El Shafee Elsheikh =

British-Sudanese convict

- الشافعي الشيخ
- Born: 16 July 1988 (age 38); Omdurman, Sudan
- Known for: A role in ISIL atrocities as a member of the "Jihadi Beatles"
- Status: Incarcerated at ADX Florence
- Convictions: Hostage taking resulting in death (18 U.S.C. § 1203) (4 counts); Conspiracy to commit hostage taking resulting in death (18 U.S.C. § 1203); Conspiracy to murder United States citizens abroad (18 U.S.C. §2339B); Conspiracy to provide material support to terrorists (18 U.S.C. § 2339A); Providing material support to a designated foreign terrorist organization (18 U.S.C. § 2339B)
- Penalty: Eight concurrent life sentences without the possibility of parole

El Shafee Elsheikh (Arabic: الشافعي الشيخ; born 16 July 1988), known as Jihadi Ringo, is a Sudanese terrorist who took part in atrocities of the Islamic State between 2012 and 2015 as one of the four so-called Jihadi Beatles. He was found guilty of eight charges of hostage taking and murder by an American court in 2022 and later sentenced to eight life sentences without the possibility of parole.

== Early life and family ==
Elsheikh was born in Omdurman, Sudan. Although his family was Muslim, they were not particularly devout. His family fled the country following a coup d'état led by Omar al-Bashir that overthrew the democratically elected government. Elsheikh and much of his extended family lived in Cairo, Egypt, for four years as political refugees, spending most of his time with aunts and younger cousins, describing the former as "second mothers". In 1994, an asylum application made by Elsheikh's father was approved by the United Nations, with Elsheikh, his parents, and his brother being relocated to the United Kingdom, while other relatives remained in Egypt.

Elsheikh spent his youth in White City, London. The Daily Telegraph reports he was a follower of a local football team, Queen's Park Rangers, and dreamed of joining the team when he grew up. A second brother was born in England before Elsheikh's parents divorced around 2000, with him and his siblings living with their mother. Elsheikh gained fluency in English in elementary school and after secondary school, he entered vocational training, where he completed plumbing, bricklaying, and mechanical trades. He studied mechanical engineering at Acton College and worked as a fairground ride maintenance worker. At age 19, Elsheikh was stabbed and injured in a fight with a gang member.

In 2009, Elsheikh began Islamic studies, after acquaintances with criminal pasts appeared to reform after dedicating themselves to religion. In 2010, while in Canada, Elsheikh married Dure Ahmed, a Canadian citizen of Ethiopian descent, but he was not allowed to bring her back to England. Between 2010 and 2011, Elsheikh became involved in an aid organisation, collecting clothes, food and medicine, after hearing about atrocities committed in Syria by the Assad government during peaceful protests.

== Terrorist activity ==
In 2011, Elsheikh took part in protests by the banned Islamist group Muslims Against Crusades. He was arrested at one such counter-rally to an English Defence League (EDL) march on 11 September 2011, alongside Alexanda Kotey, the later "Jihadi George". They were suspects in relation to a stabbing committed during the demonstration and released the same day without charge. In 2012, Elsheikh left the United Kingdom for Syria to fight government forces, joining Jabhat al-Nusra. As various jihadist factions had allied themselves against the Assad government, Elsheikh eventually joined the Islamic State.

In 2014 and 2015, IS held dozens of European and North American captives, and the brutal conditions of their detention were widely reported. Four English-speaking terrorists played a central role in the brutality. Their identities were initially either not known or security officials did not make their identities known to the public. Due to their British accents, their captives dubbed them The Beatles, with Mohammed Emwazi, the most well-known of the group, having been dubbed "Jihadi John". Elsheikh and Alexanda Kotey were identified as potential members of "the Beatles" around 2013, after hostages mentioned that they talked about their arrests at an EDL march in 2011, with their arrests and questioning having been recorded on video. Voice analysis showed a "very strong likelihood" that Elsheikh's voice was a match for the "Beatle" who acted as the main torturer for the group. Elsheikh was further linked to the group via a Telegram channel found on a mobile phone which was seized from his brother, who was arrested during the anti-gun crime initiative Operation Trident.

On 30 March 2017, Elsheikh and four other men were named as suspected terrorists, by the United States State Department, under Executive Order 13224. This Executive Order signed by US President George W. Bush, shortly after al-Qaeda's attacks on 9/11, allowed the State Department to bar US citizens, US financial institutions, and other US corporations, from having any financial transactions with designated individuals.

Syrian Democratic Forces (SDF) captured Elsheikh and Kotey, on 24 January 2018 near the Turkish border to Syria as they fled from the collapse of the short-lived Islamic State-claimed territories. The pair were reported to have been trying to blend in with genuine civilian refugees, fleeing the collapse of the last IS enclaves. While the pair were identified as "Jihadi Ringo" and "Jihadi George", there was uncertainty over who was which, with Elsheikh often being referred to by either name, though he has been consistently referred to as the former since 2025.

=== Wife ===
When Elsheikh moved to Syria, he travelled there with a second wife. His Canadian wife Dure Ahmed moved there to join them, where she then had children with Elsheikh. Ahmed was repatriated to Canada from Syria in April 2023, after joining a court case against the Government of Canada demanding that Canadian wives and children of ISIS terrorists be brought home. She was arrested upon her arrival, then released with strict bail conditions, facing further conditions and possible charges under a terrorism peace bond at hearings in October 2023.

== Prosecution ==
The Independent reported that the United Kingdom government was considering agreeing that Kotey and Elsheikh could be transferred to the Guantanamo Bay detention camp. Detention in Guantanamo could be indefinite detention, without charge, if transferred to US custody. For a civilian trial, it was anticipated that they would be incarcerated at the Supermax prison in Florence, Colorado, if they were convicted.

Another option under consideration was trial at the International Court in The Hague. According to The Independent, the UK government would first strip Kotey and Elsheikh of UK citizenship, prior to agreeing to transfer to The Hague.

The Guardian quoted Tobias Ellwood, the UK Minister of Defence, who argued that transfer to Guantanamo was inappropriate. In a face-to-face interview with Jenan Moussa of Al Aan TV in Kobanî, Syria, at the beginning of April 2018, Elsheikh said he was interviewed by US and SDF officials, but not by UK officials.

On 7 October 2020, Elsheikh and Alexanda Kotey were brought to the United States to face charges of beheading western hostages. Elsheikh denied being a member of "the Beatles" but admitted joining the IS terrorist group. On 14 April 2022, after a three-week trial, he was found guilty of lethal hostage taking and conspiracy to commit murder and on 19 August 2022, was sentenced to eight life sentences without the possibility of parole. Elsheikh immediately confirmed his intention to appeal his conviction.

On 24 September 2022, Elsheikh was transferred into the custody of the Federal Bureau of Prisons and designated to United States Penitentiary, Florence High. Some members of the victims of family expressed disappointment in the Bureau of Prisons for designating Elsheikh and Kotey to merely high-security penitentiaries instead of the federal supermax ADX Florence. David Spencer of the Center for Crime Prevention slammed the decision, claiming it was a "soft" punishment for the actions of Elsheikh and Kotey. On 3 March 2023, Elsheikh was transferred from Florence High to the adjacent ADX Florence. In August 2025, Elsheikh asked to be transferred to the United Kingdom, after Sebastian Gorka, U.S. Deputy Assistant to the President, called for foreign IS-affiliates in United States custody to be returned to their countries of origin. Robert Jenrick, Shadow Secretary of State for Justice, stated that the UK would not oblige the request since Elsheikh was no longer a British citizen and that a repatriation would have to go through Sudanese authorities.
