= Aine Davis =

British Islamic terrorist (born 1984)

Aine Lesley Davis
- Born: 11 February 1984 (age 42); London, England
- Status: Incarcerated
- Other names: Aine Leslie Rodrigues; Jihadi Paul; Hamza
- Spouse: Amal el-Wahabi
- Convictions: Being a member of a terrorist group (Turkey); Illegal firearm possession, financing terrorism (UK)
- Penalty: 7 years and 6 months in prison (Turkey); 8 years in prison, 2 on licence (United Kingdom)

Aine Lesley Davis (born 11 February 1984), also known as Jihadi Paul, is a British convert to Islam who was convicted in a Turkish court of being a member of a terrorist group while serving as a fighter for the ISIL.

== Personal life ==
Aine Davis was born in Hammersmith, London, on 11 February 1984. He is reported to have been a drug dealer, and is thought to have converted to Islam shortly after being jailed in 2006 for firearms offences.

Davis was married to Amal El-Wahabi, who was born in the United Kingdom to parents of Moroccan origin. She attended Holland Park Comprehensive. El-Wahabi and Davis met at her mosque's daycare, when they were 19 years old. The pair had two children together.

He is thought to have left the United Kingdom for Syria in July 2013.

=== Terrorism conviction of Amal El-Wahabi ===
In August 2014, El-Wahabi was convicted of funding terrorism for trying to send €20,000 to her husband, described in court as a fighter for ISIL.

After his departure El-Wahabi had asked a friend from Holland Park Comprehensive to smuggle the funds to Turkey in her underwear. The Mirror, and other newspapers reporting on the trial, described the friend as having been duped into smuggling the funds without realizing the funds were intended to support terrorism. The friend was later acquitted. Messages on El-Wahabi's mobile phone between herself and Davis, were used by the prosecution to argue that El-Wahabi should have realized Davis was involved in militancy, and that funds sent to Davis would be supporting terrorism. Citing text messages the pair exchanged on their mobile phones, the prosecution argued that El-Wahabi arranged the funds transfer to retain Davis's loyalty, because he had talked of taking a second wife.

In November 2014, El-Wahabi received a 28-month sentence, half of which she would have to serve in custody.

== Foreign captives ==
ISIL held some Western captives, and it was widely reported that they were tortured, subjected to mock executions, and some of them were ultimately beheaded. Four guards with British accents, dubbed "The Beatles", were alleged to have played a central role in their abuse. The most vocal, who appeared in several videos, issuing threats, was dubbed "Jihadi John". Davis, whose identity had not been established, was alleged to have been "Jihadi Paul". In July 2022, prosecutors in the United States, refusing to take over Davis's case, claimed that there were only three members of the cell and "Paul" did not exist.

== Prosecution ==
=== Turkish capture and conviction ===
Davis was captured by Turkish security officials, in Istanbul, on 12 November 2015. A Turkish court subsequently convicted him of being a member of a terrorist group and sentenced him to seven and a half years in jail.

At his trial in 2017, Davis denied being a member of Islamic State. He claimed to have been living in Gaziantep, Turkey and to have visited Syria on only two occasions to do "aid work". He further claimed to have travelled to Istanbul with the purpose of obtaining a fake passport as he was aware he was a "wanted man". He admitted being acquainted with Mohammed Emwazi, aka Jihadi John, having attended the same mosque, in London but denied encountering him in Syria. He claimed a photo of him, posing with armed fighters, dated to 2013, and he had taken it as a joke in Idlib and did not know who the gunmen were.

=== Call for trial in the United Kingdom ===
In February 2018, several captives who had endured abuse by the surviving members of "The Beatles", called for them to face prosecution in the United Kingdom.

=== Deportation to the United Kingdom and further terrorism charges ===
On 10 August 2022, Davis was deported from Turkey to the United Kingdom. Upon arrival at Luton Airport, he was arrested by the Metropolitan Police Counter Terrorism Command and taken into custody under various sections of the Terrorism Act 2000. On 11 August 2022, he was charged under sections 15, 17 and 57 of the Terrorism Act 2000 and remanded into custody.

On 10 March 2023, Davis appeared at the Old Bailey for his plea hearing on charges of possessing a firearm "for a purpose connected with the commission, preparation or instigation of acts of terrorism" and two charges of funding terrorism. Entering a plea of "not guilty", he was remanded into custody by Judge Mark Lucraft KC pending a further hearing on 18 April 2023.

On 16 October 2023, Davis appeared in court again, where he pleaded guilty to all three charges. On 13 November 2023, Davis was sentenced to 8 years in prison, consisting of 6 years for the firearms charge and 2 years for the fundraising charges. He was further sentenced to 2 years on licence once his prison term is up.
