= Norodom Chakrapong =

Cambodian prince (born 1945)

His Royal Highness Samdech Krom Preah Norodom Chakrapong
- សម្តេចក្រុមព្រះ នរោត្តម ចក្រពង្ស

Deputy Prime Minister of Cambodia
- In office January 1992 – June 1993
- Prime Minister: Hun Sen
- Preceded by: Bou Thang
- Succeeded by: Norodom Sirivudh; Sar Kheng

Member of the Senate of Cambodia
- In office January 2006 – November 2006
- President: Chea Sim

Vice President of the Norodom Ranariddh Party
- In office November 2006 – June 2007
- President: Norodom Ranariddh
- Preceded by: Position established
- Succeeded by: Chhim Siek Leng

Member of the Constitutional Council of Cambodia
- Incumbent
- Assumed office 2013
- President: Ek Som Ol, Im Chhun Lim

Personal details
- Born: 21 October 1945 (age 81) Phnom Penh, Cambodia, French Indochina
- Party: Funcinpec Party (1981–1991; 1999–2001; 2004–2006)
- Other political affiliations: Norodom Ranariddh Party (2006–2007); Khmer Soul Party (2002–2004); Cambodian People's Party (1991–1994)
- Spouse: Norodom Kachanipha Chakrapong
- Children: 13
- Parent(s): Norodom Sihanouk; Sisowath Pongsammoni
- Website: Norodom Racvivong Foundation

Military service
- Allegiance: Cambodia
- Branch/service: Royal Cambodian Armed Forces
- Years of service: 1963–1970; 1981–1991 (Armée Nationale Sihanoukiste); 1993–1994
- Rank: Major-General

Norodom Chakrapong (born 21 October 1945) is a Cambodian politician, businessman and former major-general of the Royal Cambodian Armed Forces. He is the fourth son of Norodom Sihanouk of Cambodia and also a half-brother of the current king, Norodom Sihamoni. Chakrapong started his career as a military pilot in 1963. After Sihanouk was overthrown in 1970, Chakrapong spent time under house arrest, then in Beijing as the Head of Protocol of then-Prince Sihanouk, afterwards living overseas before he joined the Funcinpec in 1981 and fought against Vietnamese occupation as a commander of the Armée Nationale Sihanoukiste. In 1991, Chakrapong left Funcinpec to join the Cambodian People's Party (CPP) and served as the Deputy Prime Minister of Cambodia between 1992 and 1993. When the CPP lost the 1993 general elections, Chakrapong led a secession attempt in 1993. In 1994, he was accused of joining a failed coup attempt (which he denied) which led him to be sent into exile. After Chakrapong was pardoned in 1998, he founded a private airline company, Royal Phnom Penh Airways. The airlines later stopped all operations in early 2006.

In 2002, Chakrapong established a royalist party, the Khmer Soul Party. When the Khmer Soul Party failed to win a single parliamentary seat in the 2003 general elections, Charkapong rejoined Funcinpec and briefly served as Senator in 2005. In 2006, Chakrapong was expelled from Funcinpec and joined the Norodom Ranariddh Party. When the Cambodian government pursued legal investigations on the debts Chakrapong accumulated from his airlines, Chakrapong quit politics in 2007. Chakrapong, who was already a privy councillor to the Supreme Privy Council, then dedicated himself to humanitarian work and supporting royal activities. In 2013, Chakrapong was appointed member of the Constitutional Council of Cambodia by the King.

== Early life ==
Norodom Chakrapong was born at the Khemarin Palace in Phnom Penh, Cambodia to Norodom Sihanouk and Sisowath Pongsanmoni. As a young boy, Chakrapong was trained as a ballet dancer at the Royal Ballet of Cambodia, and performed at several state functions when Sihanouk attended or hosted foreign dignitaries when he was Prime Minister. In 1958, Chakrapong was sent with his half-brother Ranariddh to Marseille, France, where they attended high school. After graduating in 1963, Chakrapong returned to Cambodia and became an officer cadet with the Royal Cambodian Air Force where he graduated at the top of his class. After completing his cadet course, Chakrapong was sent back to France for a year where he received extensive training in flying MiG-21 jets. He returned in 1967 and was later commissioned as a lieutenant. When Lon Nol launched a coup against Sihanouk in March 1970, Chakrapong was arrested and kept under house arrest until November 1973. After his release, Chakrapong went to Beijing, China, where he joined his father and served as his father's Chief of Protocol between 1973 and 1975. In 1975, Chakrapong travelled to Yugoslavia at the invitation of Josip Broz Tito. He spent a year at the Yugoslav Air Force Staff College, before he moved to France with his family as political refugees in 1976. Chakrapong settled in Créteil until 1981. During this time, Chakrapong ran a small enterprise to provide a source of income for his family.

== Political career ==
=== First time in Funcinpec ===
Chakrapong joined Sihanouk in helping to form the Funcinpec in March 1981. He was appointed a commander of the Armee Nationale Sihanoukiste (ANS, informally known as the Funcinpec army). The following year, Chakrapong was made GCKD Minister of Health and Social Affairs for the party, a position that he held until 1984. In March 1985, Chakrapong became the deputy Chief of Staff of ANS. During this time, Chakrapong defended ANS military bases against Vietnamese incursions. In 1989, Ranariddh made Chakrapong to represent Funcinpec in negotiations leading to the 1991 Paris Peace Accords. Chakrapong was against the decision to co-opt the Khmer Rouge into playing any role in future Cambodian governments, a stand that came into conflict with Ranariddh and other senior Funcinpec leaders. Chakrapong was a leading figure of the guerilla war against the Vietnamese occupation, spending most of the time in the jungle at the Cambodia-Thailand border.

=== Cambodia People's Party, secession and coup attempt ===
In late 1991, Chakrapong quit Funcinpec to join the CPP at Hun Sen's invitation. He was given a seat in the party's politburo, and in January 1992 Chakrapong was appointed Deputy Prime Minister in charge of civil aviation, tourism, industry, culture, education, and social welfare affairs. Shortly after he was appointed to the post, Chakrapong was appointed director of Kampuchea Airlines. He also encouraged foreign investment in Cambodia and provided support to investors that established financial institutions and enterprises in the country.

When the 1993 general elections were held, Chakrapong campaigned for a Presidential system of government for Cambodia with Sihanouk as president. On 10 June, Chakrapong led a few senior CPP allies, including Sin Song and Bou Thang, to declare the secession of seven eastern Cambodian provinces bordering Vietnam from control by the United Nations Transitional Authority in Cambodia (UNTAC). The region was renamed the "Samdech Euv Autonomous Zone". UNTAC staff personnel were ordered to leave, and Chakrapong issued orders to soldiers under his command to ransack UNTAC and Funcinpec offices in these provinces. Three days later, Ranariddh returned to Cambodia to preside over an emergency parliamentary meeting to reinstate Sihanouk as the country's Head of State. At the same time, Tea Banh issued a directive to the Royal Cambodian Armed Forces to restore order in the seven eastern provinces. When Chakrapong received news of these developments, he fled across the border to Vietnam on 15 June. Sihanouk made a formal request for Chakrapong to drop his secessionist movement and return to Phnom Penh. Chakrapong obeyed his father's request to return and was awarded the military rank of Major-General for the Royal Cambodian Armed Forces.

After a permanent government was formed in September 1993, Chakrapong and Sin Song appealed to the CPP politburo to be reinstated as Members of Parliament. The CPP made several motions for this purpose, but faced strong opposition from Funcinpec members of parliament under Ranariddh's instructions. In May 1994, the CPP was able to secure support from Funcinpec to outlaw the Khmer Rouge in exchange for an agreement not to pursue any further motions to reinstate Chakrapong and Sin Song as Members of Parliament. In July, Chakrapong was accused of participating to a failed coup attempt by Gen. Sin Song. He has always denied his involvement.

Hun Sen ordered soldiers to arrest Sin Song, Sin Sen, and Chakrapong. When Chakrapong heard that Sin Song was arrested, he became worried for his life and safety, and sought refuge at Regent Hotel in Phnom Penh on 3 July. Chakrapong called American journalist Nate Thayer for help, who assisted him to negotiate with government ministers and diplomats for safe passage out of Cambodia. Thayer had initially to sought asylum in the United States but was unsuccessful in contacting US Ambassador Charles Twining. After several hours of negotiations, the government allowed Chakrapong to leave Cambodia for Malaysia. Chakrapong issued a statement to deny his involvement in the coup attempt, and sent a letter to then-Malaysian Deputy Prime Minister Anwar Ibrahim for long-term asylum in Malaysia. Anwar turned down Chakrapong's request after Ranariddh expressed disapproval, and Chakrapong subsequently sought long-term refuge in France where he was to stay for the next four years.

=== Subsequent political career ===
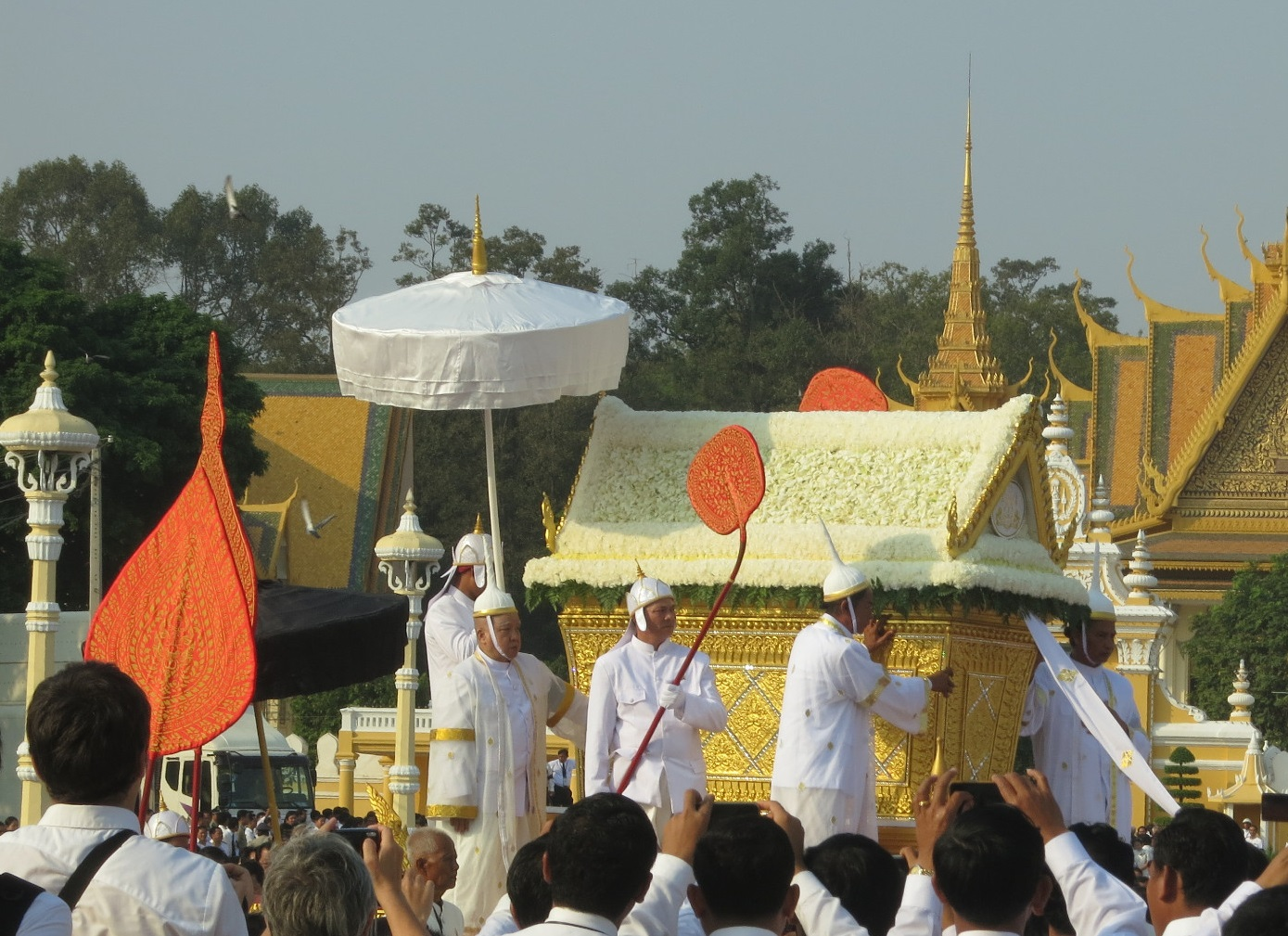
Chakrapong accompanying Sihanouk's hearse at his father's funeral in February 2013.

Chakrapong received a royal pardon from Sihanouk in November 1998 and returned to Cambodia in early 1999. He subsequently rejoined Funcinpec as an ordinary member in March 1999 at Ranariddh's invitation. Chakrapong abstained from playing an active role in the party to avoid renewing tensions with his brother, and focused on his business career. In April 2001, Chakrapong shared the idea of forming a new party with Funcinpec party members. In May 2002, Chakrapong launched the Khmer Soul Party. After the Khmer Soul Party failed to win any seats in the 2003 general elections, Chakrapong dissolved the party and returned to Funcinpec in March 2004. In May 2005, Chakrapong was appointed to the newly minted party post of general-inspector. In January 2006, Chakrapong was elected senator for Prey Veng Province. Two months later, Ranariddh appointed him secretary-general, but faced opposition from some senior party members such as Nhek Bun Chhay and Lu Laysreng. Within a week of Chakrapong's nomination, the finance ministry issued a bill calling for him to pay up due taxes from a failed airline business venture, prompting Chakrapong to withdraw from the secretary-general post.

In May 2006, an anonymous letter from the Ministry of Information was circulated within the party, stating Ranariddh's purported intention to form a new royalist party. Nhek Bun Chhay followed the issue closely and provided a list of party members who were planning to defect from Funcinpec, which included Serey Kosal and Chakrapong. At the same time, Nhek Bun Chhay appointed Nouv Sovathero party spokesman, while re-designating the then-incumbent party spokesman Chea Chanboribo the personal spokesman for Ranariddh. The cascade of incidents from Nhek Bun Chhay stoked anger from Serey Kosal and Chakrapong who threatened to sue him. When Ranariddh was fired from his position as the president of Funcinpec in October 2006, Chakrapong was also expelled from the party and senate the following month.

Within days after his expulsion, Chakrapong joined Ranariddh to form the Norodom Ranariddh Party (NRP), and was in turn appointed the party's vice president. Ranariddh had been issued two lawsuits over embezzlement of property and adultery, and Chakrapong publicly defended Ranariddh, saying that the lawsuits were politically motivated. After Ranariddh sought exile in Malaysia in March 2007 following his conviction over his embezzlement charges, Chakrapong served as the party's acting president. In the same month, Hun Sen reopened the case on Chakrapong's debts and filed legal charges against him. When the commune elections were held in April 2007, Chakrapong led the NRP to secure 472 out of 11,459 commune councilor seats available. Following the commune elections, Chakrapong resigned from the NRP in June 2007.

== Business career ==
In October 1999, Chakrapong founded Royal Phnom Penh Airways. Chakrapong raised US$2 million from personal savings and bank loans, which he used to acquire one 52-seater Antonov-24 and another 100-seater Yakovlev Yak-42 airplanes. The airlines flew domestic routes within the first year of operations and most of its customers were Chinese, Taiwanese, and Japanese tourists. By May 2001, Royal Phnom Penh Airways secured three authorizations to fly between Phnom Penh–Bangkok, Phnom Penh–Ho Chi Minh City as well as Ho Chi Minh City–Siem Reap. The airlines attempted to secure two additional routes from the Cambodian government—Bangkok-Siem Reap in August 2001 and Siem Reap-Bangkok in August 2002—but lost both bids to other airlines. Chakrapong accused the government political bias in awarding the deals due to his political affiliations. In October 2003, the director of Battambang Airport, Prum Chantha, reported that Royal Phnom Penh Airways had accumulated $1 million in unpaid taxes. Chakrapong suspended domestic flights between Phnom Penh and Battambang as foreign tourists opted for land transport options to provincial capitals which were cheaper than air transport. Royal Phnom Penh Airways had already become bankrupt by March 2006 when the government presented Chakrapong a bill of $1.36 million in unpaid taxes, navigation, and landing fees. When Chakrapong failed to repay the taxes to the government, Hun Sen issued a lawsuit in March 2007 against him.

== Palace relations ==
=== Awards and appointments ===
Chakrapong was bestowed the title of Sdech Krom Khun in February 1994, which translates as "The Great Prince". Chakrapong was given the royal title of Samdech Preah Mohessara in August 2004 by Sihanouk shortly before the latter handed over the throne to Sihamoni. Chakrapong was appointed as a privy councilor of the Supreme Privy Council of Cambodia with the rank equivalent to Deputy Prime Minister. He also established a foundation named after his older brother, the Norodom Racvivong Foundation, to support charitable and humanitarian initiatives for the poor. In 2013, Prince Chakrapong was appointed member of the Constitutional Council, as one of the three members representing the King (out of 9 members).

=== Succession debates to the throne ===
In the 1990s, a public debate on ensued in Cambodia over the succession to the royal throne after Sihanouk was diagnosed with multiple health problems. Unlike Ranariddh or Sihamoni, Chakrapong was not a popular candidate, and a poll in 1995 by the Khmer Journalists' Association showed that only 6% out of 700 respondents supported Chakrapong's candidacy to the throne. Julio Jeldres, Sihanouk's official biographer, expressed in 1999 that Chakrapong had little chance of becoming the next king due to his alleged involvement in the 1994 coup attempt. In August 2002, Chakrapong raised the idea of holding national elections to choose a successor, and expressed concern over political interference in the Cambodian throne council. Chakrapong's proposal had the support of Jeldres and Son Chhay, an opposition member of parliament who expressed similar concerns, but was opposed by Hun Sen.

== Family ==
Chakrapong's mother, Sisowath Pongsanmoni, was the younger half-sister of Sisowath Kossamak, mother of Sihanouk. Both Pongsanmoni and Kossamak had the same father, Sisowath Monivong. Pongsanmoni died in 1974. Chakrapong has six full siblings, consisting of three brothers (Yuvaneath, Rachvivong and Khemanourak) and three younger sisters (Sorya Roeungsi, Kantha Bopha and Botum Bopha). Khemanourak, Sorya Roeungsi and Botum Bopha were killed by the Khmer Rouge, while Rachvivong and Kantha Bopha died young of illness. Yuvaneath is Chakrapong's sole surviving full sibling, and Chakrapong has six other half-siblings by Sihanouk's unions with different wives.

Chakrapong has had seven wives and has thirteen children. His past wives include Hun Soeun, Kethy Tioulong (daughter of Nhiek Tioulong), Duong Diyath, Duong Yany, Charuwan Duangjan (a Thai national), and Moniren. Following his separation from Moniren, Chakrapong took Princess Norodom Kachanipha Chakrapong as his wife and she remains his spouse until today.

His children include Princess Norodom Pongsoriya.

=== Grandchildren ===
1. Princess Norodom Jenna (born 2012, by Bophary)

== Bibliography ==
- Mehta, Harish C. & Julie B. (2013). Strongman: The Extraordinary Life of Hun Sen: The Extraordinary Life of Hun Sen. Singapore: Marshall Cavendish International Asia Pte Ltd. ISBN 978-9814484602.
- Mehta, Harish C. (2001). Warrior Prince: Norodom Ranariddh, Son of King Sihanouk of Cambodia. Singapore: Graham Brash. ISBN 9812180869.
- Narong, Men S. (2005). Who's Who in Cambodia: Special Focus on the Royal Family 2005-2006. Phnom Penh Cambodia: Media Business Networks. ISBN 2951352409.
