= Samdech Euv Autonomous Zone =

Cambodian secessionist area in 1993

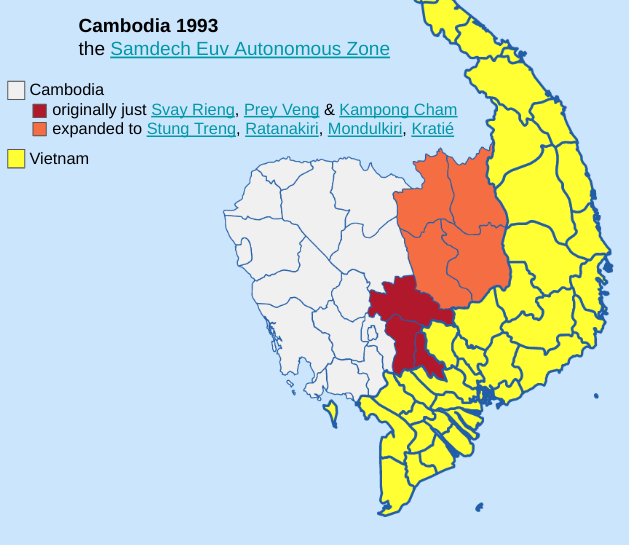
Cambodia 1993 the Samdech Euv Autonomous Zone

The Samdech Euv Autonomous Zone was a short-lived secessionist entity which existed in seven eastern Cambodian provinces between 10 June and 15 June 1993. The zone was announced by Norodom Chakrapong of the Cambodian People's Party as a response to the victory of FUNCINPEC in the 1993 Cambodian election.

The zone originally covered just the three provinces of Svay Rieng, Prey Veng and Kampong Cham before being expanded to cover Stung Treng, Ratanakiri, Mondulkiri, Kratié.
