= The Beatles (terrorist cell) =

Terrorist cell affiliated with the Islamic State of Iraq and the Levant

"The Beatles" was the nickname for an Islamic State cell composed of four British militants. The terrorist group was named by their hostages after the English rock group The Beatles, referring to the members as "John", "Paul", "George", and "Ringo".

The group was known for carrying out the 2014 beheadings in Iraq and Syria of American journalists James Foley and Steven Sotloff and British aid workers David Haines and Alan Henning. The group also held more than 20 Western hostages of ISIS in Western Raqqa, Syria. They were reportedly harsher compared to other ISIS guards, torturing captives with electroshock weapons and subjecting them to mock executions (including a crucifixion) and waterboarding.

In November 2015, one of the militants was killed and one was arrested and imprisoned in Turkey. Two were captured in early 2018, transferred to U.S. military custody, and sentenced to life imprisonment in the U.S. in 2022.

== Activities ==
The group consisted of three or four British Muslims fighting for the extremist, jihadist Islamic State of Iraq and the Levant. The group's nickname, and those of its members – "John", "Paul", "George", and "Ringo" – were used by the hostages in ironic reference to the regional English accents of the musicians. The nickname was condemned by former Beatle Ringo Starr, saying: "It's bullshit. What they are doing out there is against everything The Beatles stood for ... [we] absolutely stood for peace and love." Fans of the band were also outraged.

The terrorists took Western hostages for ISIL and held more than 20 in cramped cells in Western Raqqa, Syria, beheaded hostages, and made and published videos of their beheadings. They always kept their faces hidden.

They were assigned responsibility for guarding foreign hostages by ISIL commanders, and were reportedly harsher than other ISIL guards. One source said, "Whenever the Beatles showed up, there was some kind of physical beating or torture." According to a freed French hostage, they were the most feared of the jihadists because of their propensity to beat the captives, and their taste for the macabre, which included use of electric shock taser guns, mock executions (including a crucifixion of Foley), and waterboarding.

At one point, they were temporarily removed from their guard duties by ISIL because of their excessive brutality. Their cell held at least 23 foreign hostages, all of whom were either ransomed or killed.

The group sought to obtain ransoms for their hostages. A former hostage reported that they bragged that they had been paid millions of dollars in ransoms by certain European countries, enough to retire to Kuwait or Qatar. The group contacted families of some UK hostages, and are believed to have maintained links with their associates and friends in the UK. James Foley's mother Diane said in an interview, "Their requests were impossible for us, 100 million Euros, or all Muslim prisoners to be freed. The requests from the terrorists were totally directed towards the government, really. And yet we as an American family had to figure out how to answer them."

== 2014–2015 beheadings ==
Between the period of August 2014 to January 2015, "Jihadi John" was involved in the beheadings of American journalists James Foley and Steven Sotloff, British humanitarian aid workers David Haines and Alan Henning, American aid worker Peter Kassig, Japanese private military contractor Haruna Yukawa, Japanese journalist Kenji Goto, and 22 members of the Syrian Armed Forces.

A former ISIS member said that using a British man to carry out the beheadings was likely a deliberate effort by ISIS to "project the image that a European, or a Western person, killed an American so that they can ... appeal to others outside Syria, and make them feel that they belong to the same cause."

== Members ==
=== "John" ===
The jihadist known as "John", the leader of the group and usually referred to as "Jihadi John", was identified by The Washington Post, in February 2015, as Mohammed Emwazi, and appears in a video as Foley's killer. His identity was known to UK and US intelligence agencies in September 2014, but was not released for reasons of operational security. On 12 November 2015, a United States drone aircraft reportedly conducted an airstrike in Raqqa that targeted Emwazi as he left a building and entered a vehicle. US officials said that he was thought to have been killed in what was described as a "flawless" and "clean hit" with no collateral damage, but his death had not been confirmed. In January 2016, ISIL confirmed his death.

=== "George" and "Ringo" ===
"George" often spent time repeating sections of the Quran and promoting ISIL's extremist views publicly. He used the nom-de-guerre of "Abu Muhareb", which means "Fighter" in Arabic. The Daily Telegraph erroneously speculated that "George" was the West London jihadist Abdel-Majed Abdel Bary who may have travelled to Syria with fellow jihadist Mohammed Emwazi.

In 2016, Alexanda Kotey, a 32-year-old convert from West London, was identified as a member of the group by The Washington Post and BuzzFeed News. They were uncertain whether he was "George" or "Ringo".

A few months later, another joint investigation by the Washington Post and BuzzFeed identified the last member of the group. El Shafee Elsheikh, a British citizen whose family fled Sudan in the 1990s, was a Londoner who had travelled to Syria in 2012. They were still uncertain whether Elsheikh or Kotey was "George".

In early January 2017, the US State Department froze the assets of Alexanda Kotey but did not confirm he was "George". In late March 2017, the US State Department froze the assets of El Shafee Elsheikh but did not confirm he was "George", either. In early 2018, Kurdish fighters caught both Kotey and Elsheikh in Syria near the border with Iraq, and handed them over to American officials who confirmed their identities by biometrics and finger prints. The British citizenship of both men was revoked. In 2021 in U.S. Federal Court, Kotey pleaded guilty to "hostage-taking resulting in death and providing material support to the Islamic State group from 2012 to 2015".

According to a former hostage, Elsheikh was "George". However, according to prosecutors in Elsheikh's trial, Elsheikh was "Ringo".

=== "Paul" ===
"Paul" played a smaller role in the group and did not appear until later in the detention of some of those held by the Islamic State. Aine Lesley Davis is reported to have been one of the British Islamists assigned to guard Western hostages. In July 2022, prosecutors in the United States, refusing to take over Davis's case, claimed that there were only three members of the cell and "Paul" did not exist.

== Manhunt ==
A significant force of the British Special Air Service was deployed to Northern Iraq in late August 2014, and according to former MI6 employee Richard Barrett would be sent to Syria, tasked with trying to track down the group using a range of high-tech equipment and potentially freeing other hostages. As of September 2014, British intelligence and security agencies, including MI5 and Scotland Yard, aided by GCHQ communication monitoring, were working with the US intelligence and security agencies, including the CIA and FBI, in addition to field teams from MI6 and the CIA in Northern Syria, to identify and locate the group. British and US electronic eavesdropping agencies intercepted communications by the group.

== Trials ==
=== Elsheikh and Kotey (in the US) ===
Elsheikh and Kotey were captured on January 24, 2018 and placed in US custody in Iraq, and later transferred to the US. They were stripped of their British nationality in 2018. The possibility of indefinite detention without charge in the Guantanamo Bay detention camp was being considered by US authorities as an alternative to a civilian trial. Another option under consideration was trial at the International Court of Justice in the Hague.

Input into the case against the two men from the UK government was critical to securing a conviction. The UK legal system does not permit assistance in foreign legal cases where a death sentence is possible, but nevertheless Home Secretary Sajid Javid initially agreed to assist the US legally without getting assurances that Kotey and Elsheikh would not face the death penalty, "in large part because of anticipated outrage among political appointments in the Trump administration". However, a UK court ruling blocked the sharing of evidence with American authorities unless the death penalty was ruled out. On 18 August 2020 the US government assured the UK government that it would not seek the death penalty.

On 7 October 2020, Kotey and Elsheikh were brought to the United States to face charges of conspiracy and hostage taking resulting in death. On 2 September 2021, Kotey pleaded guilty in a US court to charges of conspiring to murder four American hostages. On 14 April 2022, Elsheikh was convicted by a federal jury on eight felony charges for his role in the terrorist cell. Elsheikh and Kotey were later sentenced to eight concurrent life sentences without the possibility of parole. Both are currently imprisoned at ADX Florence, a supermax prison located in Florence, Colorado.

=== Davis (in Turkey and the UK) ===
Aine Lesley Davis was arrested in Turkey on 13 November 2015 and tried in 2016, accused of plotting a terror attack there. On 9 May 2017, he was convicted of terrorism offences by a Turkish court and sentenced to seven and a half years in prison. In August 2022 Aine was deported from Turkey and arrested on arrival in the UK. He was charged under the Terrorism Act 2000 provisions of providing money to support terrorism and possessing a firearm for terrorism, and remanded in custody. He pleaded guilty to the charges of 16 October 2023. On 13 November that year, he was sentenced to 8 years in prison consisting of 6 years for the firearms charge and 2 for financing terrorism, with a further 2 years to be spent on license after his prison term.

== See also ==
- John Cantlie
- Decapitation in Islam
- United Kingdom and the Islamic State
- United Nations (gang)
