= Hostage Taking Act =

United States federal criminal law prohibiting hostage-taking

The United States makes hostage-taking a criminal offense pursuant to 18 U.S.C. § 1203. Generally, the Act applies to conduct occurring within the territory of the United States. However, under Subsection B, an offender may be indicted under the Act even if the hostage-taking occurred outside the territory of the United States if the "offender or the person seized or detained is a national of the United States; the offender is found in the United States; or the governmental organization sought to be compelled is the Government of the United States." These provisions are consistent with the fundamental principles of international criminal law, specifically active nationality principle, universal principle, and the effects principle, respectively.

== 18 USC 1203: Hostage Taking Act ==
(a) Except as provided in subsection (b) of this section, whoever, whether inside or outside the United States, seizes or detains and threatens to kill, to injure, or to continue to detain another person in order to compel a third person or a governmental organization to do or abstain from doing any act as an explicit or implicit condition for the release of the person detained, or attempts or conspires to do so, shall be punished by imprisonment for any term of years or for life and, if the death of any person results, shall be punished by death or life imprisonment.

(b) It is not an offense under this section:

(1) If the conduct required for the offense occurred outside the United States unless—

(A) the offender or the person seized or detained is a national of the United States;
(B) the offender is found in the United States; or
(C) the governmental organization sought to be compelled is the Government of the United States.

(2) If the conduct required for the offense occurred inside the United States, each alleged offender and each person seized or detained are nationals of the United States, and each alleged offender is found in the United States, unless the governmental organization sought to be compelled is the Government of the United States.

(c) As used in this section, the term "national of the United States" has the meaning given such term in section 101(a)(22) of the Immigration and Nationality Act (8 U.S.C. § 1101 (a)(22)).

The hostage taking act is a subsection of the 1979 United Nations General Assembly Sixth Committee's treaty, International Convention Against the Taking of Hostages. It became enforceable in the United States on January 6, 1985.
