= List of current inmates at ADX Florence =

This is a list of notable inmates held at ADX Florence.

== Foreign terrorists ==
This list contains foreign citizens who committed or attempted to commit terrorist attacks against United States citizens and interests. All sentences are without parole.

Inmate name	Register number	Photo	Citizenship	Status	Details
Zacarias Moussaoui	51427-054		France	Serving six consecutive life sentences.	French citizen and al-Qaeda operative, pleaded guilty to terrorism conspiracy charges in 2005 for playing a key role in planning the September 11 attacks by helping the hijackers obtain flight lessons, money, and material used in the attacks.
Ramzi Yousef	03911-000		Pakistan	Serving a life sentence plus 240 years.	Convicted in 1994 of terrorism conspiracy and other charges in connection with the 1993 World Trade Center bombing, which killed six people and injured more than 1,000. Yousef was also convicted in 1996 of planning Project Bojinka, a foiled plot conceived by his uncle and senior al-Qaeda member Khalid Sheikh Mohammed to assassinate Pope John Paul II and bomb twelve planes in a 48-hour period.
Abu Hamza al-Masri	67495-054		Egypt	Serving a life sentence under the name Mostafa Kamel Mostafa.	Egyptian cleric and former associate of the late al-Qaeda leader Osama bin Laden; extradited from the UK in 2012; convicted in 2014 of masterminding the 1998 kidnapping of Westerners in Yemen and conspiring to establish a terrorist training camp in Oregon in 1999.
Richard Reid	24079-038		United Kingdom	Serving three consecutive life sentences plus 110 years.	British national who became an al-Qaeda operative; pleaded guilty in 2002 to attempted use of a weapon of mass destruction in connection with his 2001 attempt to detonate explosive devices hidden in his shoes on a Boeing 767 traveling from Paris to Miami; known as the "Shoe Bomber".
Umar Abdulmutallab	44107-039		Nigeria	Serving four consecutive life sentences plus 50 years.	A Nigerian national and al-Qaeda in the Arabian Peninsula operative, follower of the late militant cleric Anwar al-Awlaki; pleaded guilty in 2011 to attempted use of a weapon of mass destruction in an attempt to blow up Northwest Airlines Flight 253 from Amsterdam to Detroit on Christmas Day 2009. He was nicknamed the "Underwear Bomber" as the bomb was sewn into his underwear.
Ahmed Ressam	29638-086		Algeria	Serving a 37-year sentence; scheduled for release on July 1, 2032.	Algerian national convicted in 2001 of terrorism conspiracy for planning to bomb Los Angeles International Airport on December 31, 1999, in what is known as one of the 2000 millennium attack plots.
Simón Trinidad	27896-016		Colombia	Serving a 60-year sentence under the name Juvenal Ovidio Palmera Pineda; scheduled for release on February 17, 2055.	Member of the Revolutionary Armed Forces of Colombia (FARC), a guerrilla group on the U.S. State Department list of Terrorist Organizations; convicted in 2007 of terrorism conspiracy for his involvement in the 2003 kidnapping of three American military contractors.
Sulaiman Abu Ghaith	91969-054		Kuwait	Serving a life sentence.	Al-Qaeda spokesman and son-in-law to Osama bin Laden. Convicted in March 2014 for conspiring to kill Americans and providing material support to terrorists.
Mamdouh Mahmud Salim	42426-054		Sudan	Serving a life sentence.	Al-Qaeda co-founder and advisor to Osama bin Laden. Extradited in 1998 for participating in the U.S. Embassy bombings and sentenced to life in prison for attempted murder during an escape attempt in 2000.
Mahmud Abouhalima	28064-054		Egypt	Serving a 78-year and four-month sentence (sentence shortened by 30 years from 108 years and four months, which was shortened from an initial 240-year sentence); scheduled for release on March 8, 2060.	Egyptian terrorist who was one of the men convicted in the 1993 World Trade Center bombing. In 1988 he traveled to Afghanistan to receive combat training. He also assisted El Sayyid Nosair in the assassination of far-right rabbi Meir Kahane, acting as the getaway driver.
Mohammed Jabarah	06909-091		Canada	Serving a life sentence.	Canadian citizen convicted of plotting to bomb U.S. embassies in Singapore and the Philippines, he was turned over to U.S. authorities after agreeing to assist them with terror investigations. He was sentenced to life in federal prison in 2008 as a result of violating the terms of his release.
Amor Ftouhi	55707-039		Canada; Tunisia; France	Serving a life sentence.	Perpetrator of the Bishop International Airport attack in Flint, Michigan in 2017, during which he stabbed an Airport Police Lieutenant in the neck; convicted in 2018 of committing an act of terrorism transcending national boundaries.
Abdulrahman El Bahnasawy	75868-054		Canada	Serving a 90-year sentence; scheduled for release on April 19, 2094.	Plotted to carry out bombing attacks at Times Square and on the New York City Subway. Convicted of material support and conspiracy to commit terror acts transcending national boundaries in 2016 and sentenced to 40 years in federal prison in 2018. El Bahnasawy was sent to ADX after he committed the stabbing of corrections officer Dale Franquet Jr at United States Penitentiary, Allenwood on December 7, 2020. Franquet lost an eye in the attack. In October 2026, he was sentenced to 50 years in prison for the attack, to run consecutively with his 40 years, increasing his overall sentence to 90 years in prison.
Akayed Ullah	79827-054		Bangladesh	Serving a life sentence plus 30 years.	Bangladeshi national who partially detonated a pipe bomb between the Times Square–42nd Street and 42nd Street–Port Authority Bus Terminal stations of the New York City Subway. The blast injured three bystanders and the perpetrator. Ullah was convicted of possessing a criminal weapon, making terroristic threats, and supporting an act of terrorism in 2018 and sentenced to life in prison plus 30 years in 2021.
Ahmed Abu Khattala	33405-016		Libya	Serving a 28-year sentence; scheduled for release on May 21, 2038.	Libyan national and leader of Ansar al-Sharia, led the Benghazi attacks against two United States government facilities in September 2012. Ansar al-Sharia members attacked a diplomatic compound on September 11, 2012, that resulted in the deaths of the U.S. Ambassador to Libya J. Christopher Stevens, and U.S. Foreign Service Information Management Officer Sean Smith. Additionally, a mortar attack was carried out against a CIA annex that resulted in the death of two more U.S. diplomats. Abu Khatallah was convicted of conspiracy to provide material support for terrorism, maliciously destroying and injuring dwellings and property, and using and carrying a semi-automatic weapon during a crime of violence. Another participant in the attack, Mustafa al-Imam was also charged and convicted of offences related to the attack and was sentenced to 19 years in prison in 2020. In 2024, Khatallah's sentence was increased by 6 years.
Irek Hamidullin	84991-083		Russia	Serving a life sentence plus 30 years.	A former member of the Russian army, Hamidullin eventually traveled to Afghanistan where he was discovered fighting for the Taliban after he led insurgents to attack Camp Leyza, a military installation where U.S. and Afghan forces were stationed. Hamidullin was held in extrajudicial detention before being tried in federal court where he was convicted on 15 counts including material support, attempted murder of U.S. military personnel, conspiracy to use a weapon of mass destruction, and possession of a firearm in connection with a crime of violence.
Ibrahim Suleiman Adnan Harun	81678-053		Niger; France	Serving a life sentence under the name Adnan Ibrahi Harun A. Hausa.	Al-Qaeda operative from Niger who was convicted of conspiracy to murder American military personnel in Afghanistan, conspiracy to bomb the U.S. Embassy in Nigeria, and providing material support to terror organization. Harun was recruited into al-Qaeda in the weeks before the September 11 attacks and traveled to Afghanistan to train al-Qaeda camps. Harun was one of several al-Qaeda soldiers to ambush a U.S. Military patrol on April 25, 2003, killing servicemen Jerod Dennis and Raymond Losano. Harun was also ordered to commit a bombing attack against the U.S. Embassy in Nigeria by al-Qaeda leaders. Harun was sentenced to life in prison in February 2018.
Alexanda Amon Kotey	11685-509		United Kingdom; Sudan	Serving eight concurrent life sentences each.	Former British citizens and members of the 'ISIS Beatles' known as "Jihadi George" and "Jihadi Ringo" respectively, sentenced to eight concurrent life terms without the possibility of parole in April and August 2022 for charges of conspiracy to commit murder, lethal hostage taking, and material support. These charges stemmed from their participation in the beheadings of American, British, and Japanese citizens while active members of the Islamic State. Kotey and Elsheikh directly participated in the negotiations and killings of James Foley, Peter Kassig, Steven Sotloff, and Kayla Mueller.
El Shafee Elsheikh	11698-509		United Kingdom; Sudan	Serving eight concurrent life sentences each.	
Sayfullo Saipov	79715-054		Uzbekistan	Serving ten life sentences plus 260 years.	Uzbek national who perpetrated the 2017 New York City truck attack, in which he drove a pickup truck rented from Home Depot through the protected bike lane of Hudson River Park in Manhattan, killing eight people and injuring eleven others. The incident was considered the deadliest terrorist attack in New York City since the September 11 attacks of 2001. Saipov committed the attack in the name of Islamic State. The death penalty was sought for Saipov; however, he was sentenced to life imprisonment in May 2023, after a jury failed to reach a unanimous decision on the matter.

== Domestic terrorists ==
This list contains U.S. citizens, regardless of origin, who committed or attempted to commit terrorist attacks against United States citizens and interests.

Inmate name	Register number	Photo	Status	Details
Dzhokhar Tsarnaev	95079-038 (Archived)		Sentenced to death on June 24, 2015. Sentence vacated in July 2020, but then reimposed on March 4, 2022.	Dzhokhar, along with his older brother Tamerlan planted a pressure cooker bomb at the finish line of the 2013 Boston Marathon, killing three people and injuring over 250. Tamerlan died 82 hours later from injuries sustained in the brothers' shootout with police. Dzhokhar escaped, but was found and arrested later that day. He was sentenced to death. He was to be transferred to USP Terre Haute in Indiana when his execution date was set, but the death sentence was vacated in July 2020 due to inadequate screening for potential biases among jury pool. The death sentence was re-imposed by the Supreme Court of the United States on March 4, 2022.
Wadih el-Hage	42393-054		Serving a life sentence.	Lebanese and naturalized American-French citizen convicted in connection with the 1998 United States embassy bombings in Kenya and Tanzania, Africa, which were conceived by al-Qaeda leader Osama bin Laden. The bombings killed 224 people and injured more than 4,000.
Terry Nichols	08157-031 (Archived)		Serving 161 consecutive life sentences.	Co-conspirator in the 1995 Oklahoma City bombing of the Alfred P. Murrah Federal Building, which killed 168 people. Timothy McVeigh, who planned and carried out the bombing, was executed in 2001.
Eric Rudolph	18282-058 (Archived)		Serving four consecutive life sentences.	Member of the Christian extremist group Army of God; pleaded guilty in 2005 to carrying out four bombings between 1996 and 1998, including the Centennial Olympic Park bombing in Atlanta; he killed three people during the bombing spree.
Faisal Shahzad	63510-054 (Archived)		Serving a life sentence.	Tehrik-i-Taliban operative; pleaded guilty to attempting to use a weapon of mass destruction and other charges in connection with the 2010 Times Square car bombing attempt; received explosives training in 2009 from the terrorist organization Tehrik-i-Taliban in Pakistan.
Naser Jason Abdo	80882-280		Serving two consecutive life sentences plus 60 years.	U.S. Army private who refused to deploy to Afghanistan and went AWOL; convicted in 2012 of attempted use of a weapon of mass destruction for plotting to detonate a bomb in 2011 at a restaurant near Fort Hood in Killeen, Texas, when it was filled with soldiers.
Muhanad Mahmoud Al Farekh	85795-053		Serving a 45-year sentence; scheduled for release on August 5, 2053.	Houston man who was convicted of terrorism-related charges in 2017 after he attended an al-Qaeda training camp in Afghanistan. He was charged with material support of terrorism for a planning role in a 2009 attack on Forward Operating Base Chapman in Khost. He had reportedly been radicalized by Zarein Ahmedzay, one of the men charged with the 2009 New York City Subway bombing plot.
Ahmad Khan Rahimi	78312-054		Serving two consecutive life sentences.	American-Afghan man from Elizabeth, New Jersey, who was convicted in U.S. District Court and New Jersey state court for use of weapons of mass destruction, bombing a place of public use, attempted murder of law enforcement officers and various other charges. On September 17, 2016, Rahimi planted and detonated explosives in Seaside Park, New Jersey, and Manhattan, New York, that injured 35 people. Another explosive was discovered in a backpack in Elizabeth, New Jersey, two days later. After Linden police attempted to apprehend Rahimi, he engaged in a shootout with members of police and shot an officer in the abdomen. Additionally, as a pre-trial detainee at Metropolitan Correctional Center, New York, he was accused of distributing terrorist propaganda and bomb-making instructions to inmates alongside fellow would-be terrorist, Sajmir Alimehmeti. Rahimi was sentenced to life in prison in 2018 in a federal case. In 2020, Rahimi was sentenced to another life term for state convictions.
Glendon Scott Crawford	20658-052		Serving a 30-year sentence; scheduled for release on February 19, 2038.	Former U.S. Navy seaman, Ku Klux Klan member, and resident of Galway, New York. In 2015, he was the first U.S. citizen ever convicted of attempting to acquire a radiological weapon. Crawford and a co-defendant attempted to construct a radiation dispersal device to be used outside of Mosques, Islamic schools, and to kill former president Barack Obama.
Barry Croft	11796-509		Serving a 19-year and 7-month sentence; scheduled for release on June 15, 2037.	Barry Croft of Bear, Delaware was one of the masterminds of the Gretchen Whitmer kidnapping plot. Croft was affiliated with far-right militia groups and the Boogaloo movement. In late 2022, Croft was convicted of kidnapping conspiracy and conspiracy to use a weapon of mass destruction for plotting to kidnap Whitmer and violently overthrow the state government. Croft was also convicted for possessing an unregistered destructive device.
Frank Robert James	83999-053		Serving ten concurrent life sentences plus 10 years.	Perpetrator of the 2022 New York City Subway attack, in which 29 people were injured, including 10 by gunfire. James was reportedly motivated by black supremacist ideologies. James was convicted of committing a terrorist act on a mass transit system and discharging a firearm during the commission of a crime of violence.
Levar Washington	29205-112		Serving a 41-year sentence; scheduled for release on February 3, 2043.	Member of Jamiyyat Ul-Islam Is-Saheeh, a terror cell formed by former Folsom State Prison inmates. The cell plotted to bomb several military bases, a number of synagogues, and an Israeli consulate in California. Washington was sentenced to 22 years in prison in 2008 for weapons offences and levying war against the United States. He was also sentenced to additional terms of 6 years and 13 years after he committed the stabbing of an inmate at USP Allenwood and a correctional officer at USP Pollock.
Ruslan Maratovich Asainov	91782-053		Serving a life sentence plus 70 years.	Naturalized U.S. citizen of Kazakh descent who was convicted of multiple terrorism-related charges in 2023. In 2014, Asainov left his family in Bay Ridge, Brooklyn and travelled to Syria to join the Islamic State. Asainov fought in numerous battles between 2014 and 2019 and was a sniper and weapons instructor for ISIS.

== Espionage ==
Inmate name	Register number	Photo	Status	Details
Peter Debbins	05852-509		Serving a 15-year and eight-month sentence; scheduled for release on December 28, 2033.	Former United States Army Special Forces officer; convicted in 2021 of conspiring to provide Russian intelligence operatives with U.S. national defense information. Between 1996 and 2011, Debbins periodically travelled to Russia and supplied intelligence agents with the information.
Joshua Schulte	79471-054		Serving a 40-year sentence; scheduled for release on December 22, 2051.	Former Central Intelligence Agency (CIA) employee who was convicted of leaking classified documents to WikiLeaks and of receiving, sending, and possessing child pornography.
Kevin Patrick Mallory	91239-083		Serving a 20-year sentence; scheduled for release on July 8, 2033.	Former Central Intelligence Agency (CIA) officer convicted in 2018 of conspiracy to transmit national defense information under the Espionage Act after he attempted to sell classified information to an Intelligence Officer working for the People's Republic of China.
Jack Teixeira	54136-510		Serving a 15-year sentence; scheduled for release on January 22, 2036.	Former airman in the 102nd Intelligence Wing of the Massachusetts Air National Guard. In April 2023, an investigation by the FBI resulted in the removal and disclosure of hundreds of classified Pentagon documents. Subsequently, Teixeira was indicted and convicted in 2024 of unlawfully disclosing National Defence Information related to the leak.

== Organized crime figures ==
Inmate name	Register number	Photo	Status	Details
James Marcello	99076-012		Serving a life sentence.	"Street Boss" of the Chicago Outfit; convicted of racketeering, participating in 18 murders, and directing criminal activities including extortion, illegal gambling, loan sharking, and bribery.
Luis Felipe	14067-074		Serving a life sentence plus 45 years.	Leader of the New York chapter of the Latin Kings gang; convicted in 1996 of murder conspiracy and racketeering for running a criminal enterprise whose members engage in murder, assault, armed robbery, and drug trafficking; Felipe is known as "King Blood".
Tyler Bingham	03325-091		Serving a life sentence.	Aryan Brotherhood prison gang founder; was transferred to ADX in 2006 after being connected to violent gang activities in prison; convicted of murder, murder conspiracy, and racketeering for ordering the killing of two inmates at USP Lewisburg, Pennsylvania.
Jeff Fort	92298-024		Serving a 68-year sentence; scheduled for release on October 14, 2044.	Founder of the El-Rukn (Black P. Stones) gang in Chicago; convicted of drug trafficking in 1983; convicted of terrorism conspiracy in 1987 for plotting to commit attacks inside the U.S. in exchange for weapons and $2.5 million from Libya.
Gerald Rubalcaba	02552-748		Serving life sentences.	Leaders of the Nuestra Familia gang, which engages in drug trafficking, extortion, and murder inside and outside of prisons in California; arrested as part of Operation Black Widow in 2001; pleaded guilty to racketeering charges in 2004.
Joseph Hernandez	02837-748		Serving life sentences.	Leaders of the Nuestra Familia gang, which engages in drug trafficking, extortion, and murder inside and outside of prisons in California; arrested as part of Operation Black Widow in 2001; pleaded guilty to racketeering charges in 2004.
Omar Portee	30063-037		Serving a 50-year sentence; scheduled for release on May 23, 2044.	Founder of the United Blood Nation gang, also known as "O.G. Mack"; convicted in 2002 of racketeering and murder conspiracy, as well as narcotics and weapons charges.
Kaboni Savage	58232-066		Serving a life sentence, commuted from the death penalty. Originally sentenced to death on June 3, 2013.	Philadelphia drug kingpin; convicted in 2013 of 12 counts of murder in aid of racketeering for ordering six drug-related homicides, as well as fire bombing the home of a federal witness, which killed two adults and four children. Commuted from the death penalty by President Joe Biden on December 23, 2024.
Juan García Ábrego	09935-000		Serving 11 consecutive life sentences.	Mexican former drug lord who served as the leader of the Gulf Cartel along the Mexico-United States border. Added to the FBI Ten Most Wanted Fugitives list in 1995, where he was captured by Mexican authorities in January 1996 and was extradited to the United States. He was convicted of 22 counts of drug trafficking, money laundering, and racketeering.
Joaquín "El Chapo" Guzmán	89914-053		Serving a life sentence plus 30 years.	Former leader of the Sinaloa Cartel. Guzmán was extradited from Mexico to the United States in January 2017, where he pleaded not guilty to all counts in Brooklyn, New York. His charges included drug trafficking, money laundering, resisting arrest, two counts of attempted escape from a Mexican prison, felon with a firearm, and murder. His defense asserted that he was not the organized crime leader that the prosecution claimed. The trial, often characterized as a trial of the century, began on November 5, 2018, and lasted until February 12, 2019, when the jury found him guilty of all counts. He was sentenced on July 17, 2019, to life imprisonment without parole.
Alfredo "El Mochomo" Beltrán-Leyva	58525-007		Serving a life sentence plus 50 years.	Cousin and former business partner of Joaquin "El Chapo" Guzman, Beltran Leyva was the leader of the Beltran-Leyva Organization that operated out of Sinaloa, Mexico. Between the 1990s and 2000s, Beltran Leyva was responsible for the wholesale shipment of cocaine and methamphetamine between the United States, Mexico, and South America. On November 15, 2014, Beltran Leyva was extradited to the United States to face trial for shipping at least 27.9 tons of narcotics into the US. On February 23, 2016, Beltran Leyva pled guilty to charges of international narcotics trafficking conspiracy and was sentenced to life imprisonment plus 50 years in 2017. Beltran Leyva was also ordered to forfeit US$529 million in profits made from his organization.
James Baxton	33576-058		Serving a 20-year sentence, scheduled for release on November 6, 2038	High-ranking leader of the Nine Trey Gangsters Bloods gang. Convicted in 2018 of racketeering conspiracy charges for directing criminal operations while serving prior sentences inside the New York state prison system alongside Pedro Gutierrez.
Pedro Gutierrez	33580-058		Serving a 20-year sentence, scheduled for release on October 16, 2034.	Leader of the Nine Trey Gangsters Bloods gang in New York, convicted of racketeering conspiracy charges for controlling the gang from various New York state prisons.
Peter Rollock	12874-058		Serving a life sentence.	Peter Rollock, also known as "Pistol Pete", was sentenced to life in prison without the possibility of parole in 2000 for six murders he committed while operating the Sex Money Murda (S.M.M.) street gang in the Bronx, New York. The S.M.M. gang became one of the largest street gangs involved in drug-trafficking in the New York area during the mid-1990s.
Dairo Antonio Úsuga	99420-509		Serving a 45-year sentence; scheduled for release on February 27, 2059.	Former leader of the Gulf Clan, he was one of the most wanted drug lords in Colombia before he was captured on October 23, 2021, and later extradited to the United States in May 2022. He was convicted of drug trafficking and sentenced to 45 years in prison, and was fined $216 million. US attorney general Merrick Garland said Úsuga "ordered the reckless execution of Colombian police officers, soldiers, and civilians," during his time as leader of the Gulf Clan.
Fotios "Freddy" Geas	05244-748		Serving a life sentence.	Former mafia hitman for the Genovese crime family who operated out of Springfield, Massachusetts. In 2011, Geas was sentenced to life imprisonment for the murders of Gary Westerman and Adolfo Bruno, hits that were carried out on the orders of the Genovese family. In 2022, Geas was indicted for the murder of James "Whitey" Bulger, former leader of the Winter Hill Gang. Bulger was severely beaten in the early morning hours of October 30, 2018, at United States Penitentiary, Hazelton.
Rubén "El Menchito" Oseguera-González	35708-016		Serving a life sentence plus 30 years.	High-ranking member of Jalisco New Generation Cartel (CJNG), and the son of CJNG leader Nemesio "El Mencho" Oseguera Cervantes. Oseguera-Gonzalez was convicted of importing tonnes of cocaine and methamphetamine into the U.S. over a 7-year period. Additionally, Oseguera-Gonzalez directed the 2015 shooting of a Mexican military helicopter in Jalisco that resulted in 10 deaths.
Arturo Gallegos Castrellon	86139-080		Serving a life sentence.	Leader of the Barrio Azteca, ordered the murder of two U.S consulate employees. Gallegos targeted the American officials because he believed they had given visas to members of a rival gang.
Gustavo Colon	07984-424		Serving a life sentence.	Major figure of the Latin Kings gang who was convicted of assisting with cocaine trafficking.
Kenneth McGriff	26301-053		Serving a life sentence.	Founder and leader of the Supreme Team drug syndicate based in Queens, New York; Convicted in 2007 of racketeering, narcotics trafficking, and murder-for-hire. Transferred out of ADX in 2011, but has now returned in October 2026.

== Other crimes ==
Inmate	BOP number	Picture	Sentence	
Ryan Routh	35967-511		Serving a life sentence plus 7 years.	Roofer from Ka'a'awa, Hawaii who attempted to assassinate U.S. President Donald Trump with an SKS semi-automatic rifle outside the Trump International Golf Club in West Palm Beach, Florida on September 15, 2024.
Jessie Con-ui	04287-748		Serving a life sentence.	Already jailed for life for killing a gang rival in Arizona, Con-ui was convicted and sentenced to life imprisonment for the murder of corrections officer Eric Williams at United States Penitentiary, Canaan.
Dwight York	17911-054 (Archived)		Serving a 135-year sentence.	Founder and leader of the Nuwaubian Nation, a black supremacist cult. Convicted in 2004 of child molestation, racketeering and conspiracy, and fraud.
Paul Bergrin	16235-050		Serving a life sentence.	Attorney convicted of conspiracy to murder a witness and racketeering, cocaine, and prostitution offenses.
Dominick Maldonado	02071-122		Serving a 163-year state sentence.	Perpetrator of the 2005 Tacoma Mall shooting. Injured six in the mall before committing four armed kidnappings. Transferred out of ADX for a short period of time, but returned in May 2023.
Michael Swango	08352-424		Serving three consecutive life sentences.	Physician and serial killer; pleaded guilty in 2000 to fatally poisoning four patients; has been linked to scores of other deaths. Sent to ADX at his own request due to safety concerns.
Mikel Edward Brady II	43755-279		Sentenced to death in 2019.	Transferred to ADX in 2021 from North Carolina state custody after a botched escape attempt from Pasquotank Correctional Institution that resulted in the deaths of four prison employees. Brady was serving a 40-year sentence for shooting a state trooper in Durham, North Carolina.
Wisezah Buckman	02531-122		Sentenced to death in 2023.	Transferred to ADX in 2025 from North Carolina state custody after a botched escape attempt from Pasquotank Correctional Institution that resulted in the deaths of four prison employees. Buckman was serving a 32-year sentence for a 2014 murder in Charlotte, North Carolina.
Jonathan Monk	02530-122		Sentenced to death in 2025.	Transferred to ADX in 2025 from North Carolina state custody for a botched escape attempt from Pasquotank Correctional Institution that resulted in the deaths of four prison employees. Monk was a former specialist in U.S. Army who was previously serving a 13-year sentence for the attempted murder of an Army sergeant's wife after a work disagreement.
Seth Frazier	02532-122		Serving four consecutive life sentences.	Transferred to ADX in 2026 from USP Terre Haute after a botched escape attempt from Pasquotank Correctional Institution that resulted in the deaths of four prison employees. Frazier was previously serving 84 to 110 months for first-degree burglary, along with an additional term for firearm possession by a felon.
Genaro García Luna	59745-177		Serving a 38-year sentence. Scheduled for release in 2052.	Former Mexican Secretary of Public Security under the presidency of Felipe Calderon; arrested in 2019 and convicted in 2023 for accepting millions of dollars in bribes from the Sinaloa Cartel in exchange for protecting drug shipments entering the United States. He is the highest-ranking Mexican official ever convicted in the United States.
Len Davis	24325-034		Serving a life sentence.	Former New Orleans Police Department officer who was convicted of depriving civil rights through the 1994 murder of Kim Groves. Davis hired a local drug dealer to kill Groves after she witnessed him beating a 17-year old whom he suspected of shooting another police officer. Davis was originally sentenced to death in 1996, but his sentenced was commuted to life in prison by President Joe Biden in 2024.
