= Irek =

Irek (Russian: Ирек) may refer to

- Irek (given name)
- Irek, Belebeyevsky District, Republic of Bashkortostan, a village in Russia
- Irek, Chishminsky District, Republic of Bashkortostan, a village in Russia

== See also ==
- Irek Ismaren, Star Wars character
