= Murder of Eve Carson =

2008 crime in Chapel Hill, North Carolina

- Carson's university portrait
- Date: March 5, 2008
- Deaths: Eve Carson
- Convicted: Demario James Atwater; Laurence Alvin Lovette Jr.
- Charges: first-degree murder, first-degree kidnapping, armed robbery, possession of a firearm by a felon.
- Verdict: Guilty

On the morning of March 5, 2008, Eve Marie Carson was abducted, robbed and shot to death in Chapel Hill, North Carolina, United States where she was a student at the University of North Carolina at Chapel Hill. Carson had been studying in her student house when two men ambushed her, forced her into a car and stole $700 from her card. After taking the money, the perpetrators dragged her into the woods before shooting her several times with a handgun. When this did not kill Carson, one of the perpetrators murdered her with a fatal shot from a shotgun to the side of her head, before fleeing the scene.

Demario James Atwater and Laurence Alvin Lovette Jr. were charged with her murder.

On May 24, 2010, Atwater pleaded guilty to first degree murder, armed robbery, and kidnapping in a plea bargain agreement that will have him serve two sentences of life in prison without the possibility of parole.

In his December 2011 trial, Lovette pleaded not guilty but was convicted and, like Atwater, was sentenced to life in prison without the possibility of parole, a sentence that was reaffirmed in a 2013 resentencing. The event received national exposure when it was mentioned on American Idol by contestant Anoop Desai. A scholarship and a memorial garden have been created at UNC in Carson's honor.

== Eve Carson ==
Carson was born on November 19, 1985, in Athens, Georgia. She attended Clarke Central High School, where she was elected president of the student body and was class valedictorian. Carson was also a member of the school's Academic team and vice president of the school's National Honor Society. Carson spent time volunteering as a peer educator at the Athens Area Attention Home, a safe house for abused and runaway teenagers, served as a page in the U.S. House of Representatives and worked as a lab assistant in a stem-cell research laboratory at the University of Georgia.

Carson attended college at the University of North Carolina at Chapel Hill where she majored in political science and biology. Her academic achievements earned her membership in the Phi Beta Kappa honor society and allowed her to become a recipient of the Morehead-Cain Scholarship.

During college, Carson participated in and led numerous organizations and service projects. She was selected to be a North Carolina Fellow to take part in a four-year leadership development program. She served as the co-president of the Honors Program Student Executive Board and as co-chairwoman of UNC's chapter of Nourish International, a hunger relief organization. She also was a member of the Committee on Scholarships, Awards and Student Aide, the Academic Advising Program, the Chancellor's Committee for University Teaching Awards, the Chancellor Search Committee, UNC-Chapel Hill's Board of Trustees, the Carolina Leadership Development Board, and the Athletic Council and was an orientation counselor at Freshman Camp.

Carson was inaugurated as president of UNC's student body in April 2007, and her term was due to expire in April 2008. In this role, Carson served as a member of the university's board of trustees and many other committees, but viewed one of her most important roles as representing all UNC students. Carson was especially vocal about providing students more predictable increases in school tuition and fees, one of her major platform points when running for student body president. Her platform also included ideas to provide additional opportunities for all students, most notably the establishment of a prestigious scholarship for students in their junior year who showed outstanding commitment and service to the university, and the creation of an endowment to fund a big-name speaker series that would be free for all students.

Carson volunteered with children. She was an assistant coach for the Girls on the Run program. In addition to coaching, she taught science to elementary school students as part of UNC's Inspire Program and tutored middle school students.

Carson studied abroad, traveling to several different countries. She also traveled to different parts of the U.S. In 2004 she participated in a wilderness leadership course in Wyoming through the National Outdoor Leadership School. During the summer of 2005, Carson traveled to Ecuador where she volunteered in the rural countryside as a medical assistant, worked on a coffee farm, and taught computer skills to members of the Indigenous Siona community in the Amazon rainforest. In 2006, Carson studied abroad with UNC's Spring Semester in Havana, Cuba and spent the summer working with a U.S. Naval Medical Research Unit in Egypt. She also was a reflections leader for the A.P.P.L.E.S. (Assisting People in Planning Learning Experiences in Service) Program at UNC.

Carson was interested in scientific policy and planned to pursue higher education after graduating from UNC, either by attending graduate school and studying public health and/or public policy or by attending law school. Prior to her death, Carson accepted a job at McKinsey & Company as a management consultant.

Carson posthumously received the Chancellor's Award for most outstanding woman in the senior class and the General Alumni Association's Distinguished Young Alumnus Award.

== Murder ==
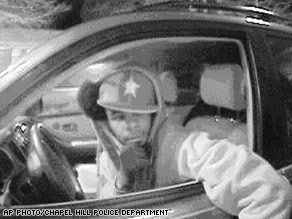
Laurence Alvin Lovette Jr. using Carson's ATM card

On the night of March 4, Lovette called his friend Jayson McNeil and asked him to drive him and his friend “Rio” to Chapel Hill where he wanted to rob someone. McNeil declined and Lovette instead drove his mother's car to Chapel Hill where he and Atwater searched for a victim.

Atwater and Lovette then saw Carson going towards her car. They forced their way into Carson's car with Lovette getting in the driver's seat and Atwater getting into the backseat. They forced Carson into the backseat where Atwater held her hostage with a gun to her head. The men threatened Carson and took her to several ATMs to rob her. At 3:55 AM they robbed her of $700 at an ATM at University Mall in Chapel Hill. They also tried to rob her at an ATM in Durham but were unable to withdraw money.

Lovette told a friend of his that during the crime, Carson tried to reason with her captors, telling them that they did not have to do what they were doing. She also begged for her life, telling them that they could take whatever they wanted and did not need to kill her. Lovette and Atwater decided to murder Carson because she had seen their faces. They took her to a densely wooded neighborhood around a mile from UNC to carry out the killing. When Carson realized that they would kill her, she asked them to pray with her.

Carson was shot five times. She first suffered shots in her right shoulder, right upper arm, right buttock, and right cheek from a .25 caliber handgun. Blood found in Carson's lungs during her autopsy indicates that she was still alive and breathing after being shot with the handgun. The fifth and fatal shot she suffered was from a sawed-off 12-gauge shotgun. It went through her right hand (indicating that she tried to shield herself) and into her right temple and brain. According to a forensic psychologist and criminal profiler, the manner in which Carson was shot showed a "complete lack of regard for another person."

According to a confidential informant, later revealed as prosecution witness Jayson McNeil, both Atwater and Lovette had shot Carson. Lovette told McNeil that he had shot Carson with the handgun while Atwater shot her with the shotgun. According to Lovette's confession, Carson was still alive and moving after being shot several times with the handgun. Atwater then stood over her and shot her again, killing her.

The medical examiner found no physical evidence that Carson had been sexually assaulted. However, Atwater touched her on different parts of her body and fiddled with her clothing.

== Perpetrators ==
Both Atwater and Lovette have extensive criminal histories. Lovette's criminal record includes convictions for drug possession, larceny, breaking and entering, and felony possession of a firearm. At the time of Carson's murder, he was on probation for breaking into a house. In a 2014 opinion, the Court of Appeals of North Carolina wrote that Lovette has “a lengthy juvenile record that exhibits a pattern of escalation of criminal activity”.

Atwater had previously been convicted of several crimes, including possession of marijuana with intent to sell, trespassing, robbery, and assault. In February 2005, he received three years' probation after being convicted of breaking into a home. In June 2006, a police officer investigating a burglary confiscated a handgun from him. He pleaded guilty to possessing a firearm while on probation and was sentenced to more time on probation. On February 20, 2008, Atwater was arrested for carrying a gun while on probation but was released on a $10,000 bond and was set to appear in court on March 3. The case was assigned to the wrong courtroom and the hearing was reassigned to March 31.

== Memorial and funeral ==
On March 6, 2008, at 3 p.m., UNC's Chancellor James Moeser spoke to the student body on the central quad, Polk Place, and at 7 p.m. students organized a candlelight vigil in the Pit, a sunken plaza near the student union building. The service included singing by three student a cappella groups and a slideshow of photos of Carson. Hundreds of people attended Carson's funeral in Athens on March 9, including Moeser, who said that Carson was "truly a gift to Chapel Hill."

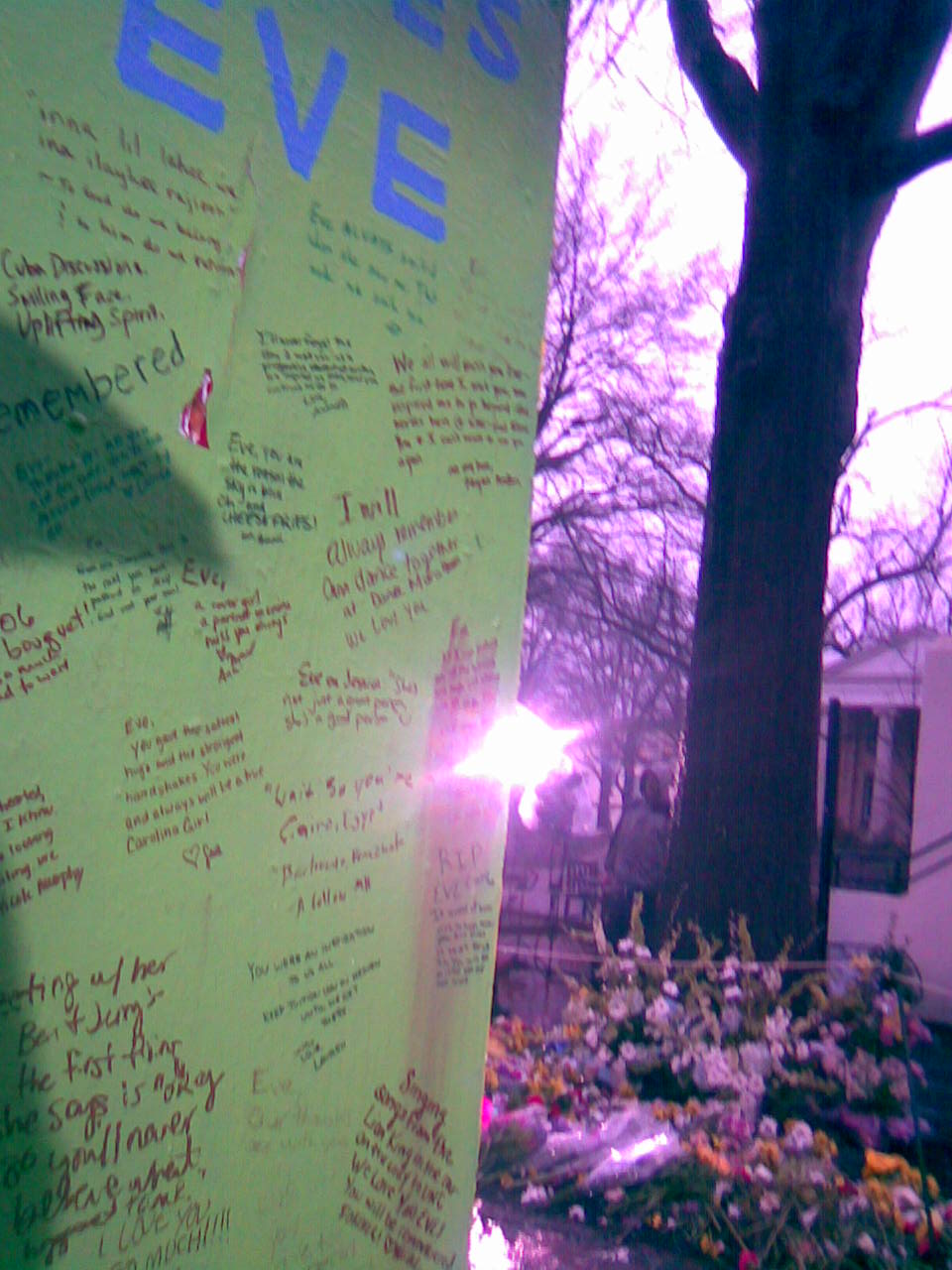
Temporary memorial on Polk Place

In honor of Carson, the North Carolina men's and women's basketball teams wore a black badge on their jersey that read "EVE" for the remainder of their seasons.

On March 8, 2008, before the start of the Carolina–Duke men's basketball game, there was a moment of silence in Carson's honor.

Carson's dual-major bachelor's degree was posthumously awarded—for the first time in the university's history—to her surviving family (parents and brother) at the May 2008 UNC graduation ceremony she would have attended had she lived. She was posthumously awarded the General Alumni Association of UNC's 2009 Distinguished Young Alumni Award.

== Investigation and prosecution ==
Carson's body was found at the intersection of Hillcrest Circle and Hillcrest Road in Chapel Hill at approximately 5 a.m. March 5, 2008, after police responded to reports of gunshots from a woman who lived in the area. The witness later testified that she had heard one gunshot, followed by a woman screaming “Ouch, hey, Ouch”, and then three more gunshots in rapid succession. Carson's body was tilted on her left hip with her right arm bent behind her head. Carson's roommates later identified her body.

Due to the high-profile nature of the case, records such as the autopsy report and search warrants were sealed from public view in the months after the murder.

On June 27, 2008, some information was released. Details in six warrants confirm that $1,400 was withdrawn from ATMs using Carson's card over a two-day period after the shooting. They also reveal that Atwater admitted to being the suspect attempting to use the ATM card in a security video taken in a local convenience store and that Lovette was indeed the person pictured in the original ATM surveillance photograph. The autopsy report was released on June 30, 2008.

=== State and federal charges ===
On March 12, 2008, first-degree murder charges were filed against Demario James Atwater, who was 21 years old at the time.

His accomplice, Laurence Alvin Lovette, Jr., who was 17 years old at the time, was arrested and similarly charged the following day.

On July 7, 2008, both suspects were indicted on additional charges of first-degree kidnapping and armed robbery along with felonious larceny and felonious stolen goods. Atwater was also indicted on possession of a firearm by a felon and possession of a weapon of mass destruction (based on the specifications of the shotgun used in the murder).

In October 2008, a federal grand jury indicted Atwater on one count of carjacking along with three firearms charges. Count one, which was carjacking resulting in death, carried a possible death penalty.

As a result of the Roper v. Simmons ruling, Lovette could not face the death penalty as he was under 18 at the time of the crimes.

=== Atwater's pleas and sentencing ===
On April 19, 2010, Atwater pleaded guilty to federal charges of carjacking, kidnapping, and weapons possession. Judge James A. Beaty of the United States District Court in Winston-Salem sentenced him to life in prison plus 30 years on September 23, 2010. Atwater was ordered to undergo substance abuse treatment and pay restitution of $212,947.10 should he ever be released, which Judge Beaty noted was "highly unlikely."

At the sentencing hearing, Atwater turned to Carson's parents and said, "I'm sorry for everything that's happened ... No matter what the court did today, it would be far from anything I should receive." Carson's parents declined to speak during the hearing.

On May 24, 2010, Atwater pled guilty to state charges of first-degree murder, first-degree kidnapping, armed robbery, possession of a firearm by a felon and possession of a weapon of mass destruction. In exchange for his plea, state prosecutors agreed not to pursue the death penalty. Judge Allen Baddour of Superior Court in Hillsborough subsequently sentenced him to life in prison without the possibility of parole for the murder charge, and also imposed a concurrent sentence of 23 to 29 years for the additional charges.

=== Lovette's trial, verdict, and sentencing ===
After pleading not guilty to state charges of first-degree murder, first-degree kidnapping, first-degree armed robbery, felonious larceny, and felonious possession of stolen goods, Lovette remained in custody while awaiting his trial, which began on December 6, 2011. Lovette declined to testify during the trial. On December 20, 2011, a jury found Lovette guilty on all charges. After the verdict, Judge Allen Baddour, the same judge who sentenced Atwater in 2010, stated, "The life that Ms. Carson led was too short, but I know that she continues to be an inspiration, not only for her family, but for thousands in this community and across this country."

Baddour subsequently sentenced Lovette to life in prison without the possibility of parole. Neither Lovette nor Carson's parents spoke before the sentence was handed down. On February 5, 2013, the North Carolina Court of Appeals vacated Lovette's life sentence and ordered a new sentencing hearing. The decision relied on Miller v. Alabama, where the Supreme Court ruled that a mandatory sentence of life in prison without parole for defendants under 18 at the time of a crime is cruel and unusual punishment. On June 3, a re-sentencing hearing was held. Prior to being sentenced Lovette said "you know, people make mistakes. Nobody's perfect. I'm not the monster that y'all made me out to be." After Baddour considered mitigating circumstances, Lovette was again sentenced to life without the possibility of parole. Orange County District Attorney Jim Woodall said that Lovette was a "predator" and that he did not care about the consequences of his actions or about other people. "He does not care about other people. He cares about one person. He cares about Laurence Lovette." Woodall also said that Lovette "should not be allowed to ever victimize another person." Lovette then appealed his sentence, arguing that his lawyers may have made different trial decisions had they known about the upcoming Miller ruling. He also argued that had he been aware of upcoming state laws prohibiting life without parole sentences for juveniles convicted of crimes other than first-degree murder, he might have conceded his guilt to underlying felonies and focused more on defending against premeditation and deliberation as a basis for the murder. Additionally, he argued that the sentencing process granted the judge too much discretion and that, because he was not irretrievably corrupt, his life sentence was cruel and unusual. In 2014 the North Carolina Court of Appeals upheld Lovette's sentence.

Prosecutors had also charged Lovette with the January 2008 murder of 29-year-old Duke University engineering student Abhijit Mahato but he was found not guilty in July 2014.

Lovette is currently serving his life sentence. He was previously incarcerated at Pasquotank Correctional Institution, a close and minimum custody prison in Elizabeth City, North Carolina. He was transferred there on April 8, 2021. During his incarceration, he has committed seventeen infractions. They include threatening to harm staff, disobeying orders, involvement with gangs, using profane language, and possessing substances and audio/video/image devices. Lovette was previously incarcerated at the Albemarle Correctional Institution. Lovett is currently incarcerated at Tabor Correctional Institution as of October 2026.

== Legacy ==
To honor her life, the University of North Carolina established the Eve Carson Scholarship (officially the Eve Marie Carson Memorial Junior-Year Merit Scholarship) in order to achieve Carson's goal of "reward[ing] students who had grown significantly in the areas of academics, social justice, and leadership since their college matriculation."

The scholarship is entirely student-run and is awarded annually to two juniors at the university. It includes a $5,000 stipend for a summer experience and half-cost of attendance for the student's senior year. The scholarship is intended to allow students to further give back to UNC by alleviating the financial burden of paying for college, upholding the scholarship's tagline of "Students Celebrating Students". The Morehead-Cain Scholarship also endowed a four-year, full merit scholarship in Carson's honor named the Eve Marie Carson Carolina Way Scholarship. The scholarship is expected to help attract qualified out-of-state students to the university and will provide recipients with additional programming and support during their undergraduate careers.

The case was brought to national attention again in 2009 after American Idol finalist Anoop Desai, who was a friend of Carson's, talked about her death on the show and how it motivated him to audition. On the second anniversary of her death, UNC dedicated the Eve Marie Carson Garden in honor of her and all students, past and future, who die before graduation. The garden is located near the Campus YMCA, an organization in which Carson was active, and contains a blue stone seat overlooking the campus's main quad. One feature of the garden is a wall of Georgia marble inscribed with her words: "Learn from every single being, experience, and moment. What joy it is to search for lessons and goodness and enthusiasm in others." Near the memorial garden is a Carolina blue butterfly-shaped bench.

The Pi Beta Phi and Phi Delta Theta chapters of UNC now host the annual Eve Carson Memorial 5K for Education in her honor. The race was established in 2008 and continues to grow each year. The money raised at the 5K benefits the Eve Carson Scholarship Fund, the Pi Beta Phi Literacy Fund, and CEO 4 Teens. The 2014 race, held on October 25, had over 1,600 registrants and raised over $116,000.

Finally, a distinguished lecture series created as part of Carson's student body president platform was renamed in her honor in the fall of 2010 by the university's Executive Branch of Student Government. The series aimed to bring big-name speakers to campus in order to challenge students and spark discussion. Speakers have included Elizabeth Edwards, Greg Mortenson, Fatou Bensouda, Mika Brzezinski, and most recently, former White House press secretary Robert Gibbs.

The North Carolina General Assembly took legislative action in the wake of Carson's murder, passing the North Carolina Street Gang Suppression Act in the summer of 2008. The law, which went into effect on December 1, imposes specific criminal procedures and additional and heightened penalties for offenders involved in criminal gang activity. It applies to crimes committed on or after its effective date.

In March 2012, controversy arose when an Indian consulting firm distributed advertising posters containing a copyrighted photo of Carson.

== See also ==
- List of kidnappings
