= Josh Block =

Josh Block may refer to:

- Joshua Block, internet personality associated with Jason Itzler
- Josh Block, co-founder of the Niles City Sound music studio
