= Irek (given name) =

Irek is a male given name in Central and Eastern Europe, both as an independent name and as a diminutive of Ireneus (Polish: Ireneusz, Czech: Irenej or Ireneus, Ukrainian: Іреней, Russian: Ириней). This name derives from the Ancient Greek Eirēnáios, from eirḗnē, meaning "peace, tranquility, harmony".

It is recently more often mistakenly considered a Tatar name due to its similarity to the Tatar word for freedom/liberty, but there are no sources indicating this alternative etymology.

Notable people with the name include:

- Irek Faizullin (born 1962), Russian statesman and politician
- Irek Gimayev (born 1957), Russian ice hockey defenceman
- Irek Ganiyev (born 1986), Russian football player
- Irek Hamidullin, Russian soldier
- Irek Kusmierczyk (born 1978), Canadian politician
- Irek Mukhamedov (born 1960), Soviet-born British ballet dancer of Tatar origin
- Irek Murtazin (born 1964), Russian journalist and blogger
- Irek Rizaev (born 1997), Russian BMX rider
- Irek Zaripov (born 1983), Russian biathlete and cross-country skier
- Irek Zinnurov (born 1969), Russian water polo player
