= Paul Bergrin =

American criminal and former lawyer

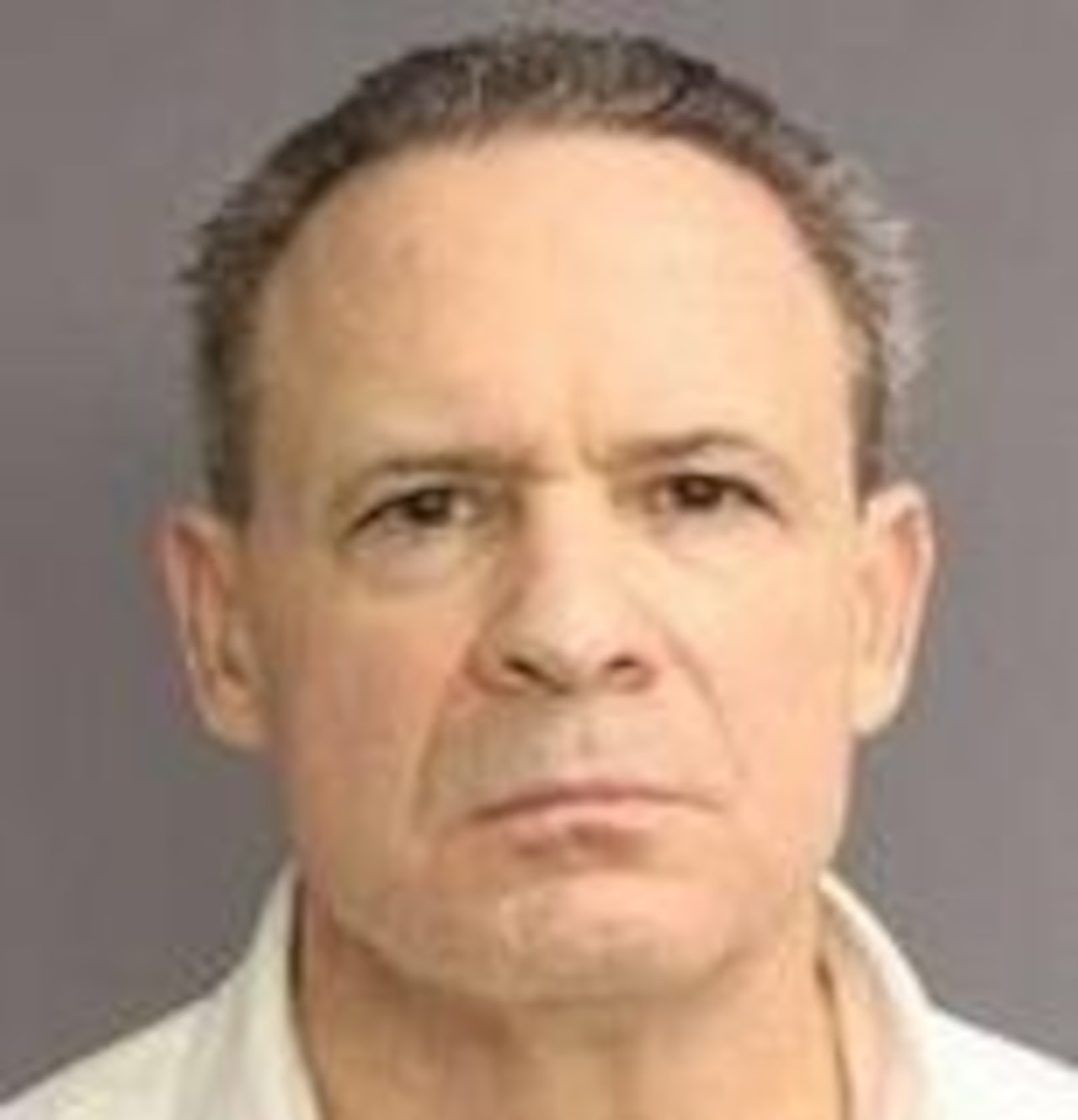
- Born: December 8, 1955 (age 70); New Jersey, United States
- Occupations: Prosecutor, defense attorney
- Spouse: Barbara Bergrin (divorced)
- Criminal charges: Conspiracy to murder a witness Bribery; Fraud; Racketeering, drug dealing, prostitution
- Penalty: 6 concurrent life sentences

Details
- Imprisoned at: ADX Florence

Paul Bergrin (born December 8, 1955) is an American convicted felon and former criminal defense lawyer who practiced law in Newark, New Jersey. Prior to his conviction, he was known for defending a range of famous and notorious clients. He was convicted of conspiracy to murder a witness and other racketeering, cocaine and prostitution offenses, and sentenced to six concurrent life terms in federal prison in 2013. He was disbarred by the Supreme Court of New Jersey in 2016. A veteran lawyer from the area said that the crimes alleged in the federal indictment would make Bergrin "the craziest, most evil lawyer in the history of New Jersey," and "that is saying something", and a federal court has likened Bergrin's downfall to the plot of a drama by Sophocles or Martin Scorsese.

== Early life and legal career ==
Bergrin grew up in Far Rockaway, Queens, then a middle-class neighborhood. He attended Brooklyn College and studied law at the Shepard Broad College of Law. Bergrin joined the U.S. Army in 1979, serving as a major in the 75th Ranger Regiment. Bergrin was admitted to the Florida bar and the New Jersey bar in 1980, and the New York bar in 1986. After his discharge from the Army, Bergrin held posts as a prosecutor in Essex County, New Jersey and, starting in 1987, for the U.S. Government as an assistant U.S. Attorney, where he served under both Samuel Alito and Michael Chertoff.

In November 1989, Bergrin testified as a character witness on behalf of two investigators for the Essex County prosecutor's office who were charged with protecting a Newark drug dealer in exchange for cocaine and money. Bergrin called the defendants "upstanding individuals who would never put their careers or jobs in jeopardy by stating anything other than the truth." Although Alito assured Bergrin before his court appearance that his job would not be affected by his testimony, Bergrin said afterwards that he felt a "coolness and aloofness" towards him from his fellow prosecutors. Several months after his testimony, Bergrin decided to resign from the U.S. attorney's office and become a defense lawyer.

From 1990 to 2005, he was a partner at Pope, Bergrin & Verdesco. Bergrin's clients included gang leaders, drug dealers, and celebrities, including drug kingpin Hakeem "E.T. Hak" Curry, Angelo "The Horn" Prisco, Queen Latifah, Naughty by Nature and Lil' Kim. He also represented Heather "Hedy" DiCarlo, a former Mrs. New Jersey accused of bouncing more than $70,000 in checks. He defended Javal Davis (charged along with Lynndie England), an Army reservist from Roselle, New Jersey who in 2005 admitted abusing detainees at the Abu Ghraib prison in Iraq, as well as PFC Corey R. Clagett, who was convicted in the Iron Triangle Murders.

Among his last cases prior to his arrest was a national multi-defendant OxyContin racketeering (RICO) case, in which his client Enin Martin pleaded guilty in February 2009 to racketeering, facing 17 years in prison.

== Criminal career ==
=== Velez perjury ===
In 2001, after Marilu Bruno-Velez dropped off her nine-year-old daughter, Carolyn Velez, at school, her husband Norberto Velez, from whom she was in the process of getting a divorce, approached her car and asked to speak with her. Carolyn was living with her father at the time under a joint custody agreement and had just spent three days with her mother, and Velez became angry that she had not returned sooner. They began arguing over custody of their daughter, and Velez stabbed his wife eight or nine times with a steak knife. A number of other parents outside the school who witnessed the stabbing called the police, and Velez was arrested and charged with attempted murder. Velez was represented by Bergrin, who argued that his client was acting in self-defense and temporarily insane. On July 8, 2003, Velez was acquitted of attempted murder, second-degree aggravated assault, and third-degree aggravated assault on the grounds of self-defense, and acquitted of fourth-degree aggravated assault with a deadly weapon on the grounds that he was temporarily insane.

Bergrin alleged that Bruno-Velez abused both Velez and his children, and "led him into deep depression and psychosis." Velez was 40 years old when the trial began and had never been arrested before, and Bergrin suggested that "something had to happen" on account of his wife's "repeated threats to remove his children and not allow him to ever see them again." Bergrin elicited testimony from Carolyn Velez that her mother had taken the steak knife used in the stabbing from her father's home, and argued that Bruno-Velez had brought it to the scene and used it to attack Velez, who Bergrin said had defensive wounds on his hands. Bergrin said that Carolyn Velez would not lie for her father's sake, as she would fear being beaten by her mother, which he said had been going on for some time. After the acquittal, Bergrin said that he had a pretty good chance of winning Velez full custody of his children. Velez faced another trial for witness tampering stemming from an allegation by his wife that he threatened to kill himself if she did not drop the charges, and was acquitted in that trial as well.

After Velez told Carolyn he had been acquitted, she told her mother that Velez, Bergrin, and Bergrin's girlfriend, Yolanda Jauregui, had coached her to lie under oath. On July 9, Bruno-Velez took Carolyn to the Essex County Prosecutor's Office, where she made a 90-minute video-recorded statement that she had been coached to lie. Velez later testified that Bergrin told her he needed her help to keep her father out of prison, and that "this is the kind of case where you can't tell the truth." She said that Bergrin told her to falsely claim that her mother "was mean and nasty and threw me down the stairs and beat me with hangers," and to falsely tell investigators that Bruno-Velez had grabbed a kitchen knife when she and Carolyn had stopped at his house to pick up her book bag on the way to school. Velez also recalled trips to New York toy stores, restaurants, and movies, as well as the gift of an autographed photo from one of Bergrin's other clients, Queen Latifah, which prosecutors characterized as bribes. She testified that she lied in statements to investigators and as a witness at a bail hearing, an evidence-suppression hearing, and her father's trials, and that after her father found out she had told the truth at one session, her father picked her up screaming, grabbed her by the neck, pushed her, and told her he would go to jail, after which she reverted to her rehearsed story, telling investigators that she was afraid of her mother because her mother had hit her and told her what to say. Bergrin suggested in his own trial that after the acquittal, Velez' mother, grandparents, aunt, uncle, and cousins had put her up to changing her story, and pointed out that Velez said in the video-recorded statement that she did not want to see her father again because he needed "anger management," questioning how such a young girl could know what "anger management" was. Bergrin also induced Velez to concede on the stand that she had told investigators Bergrin never coerced her, and she only testified the way she did because her father threatened her.

=== Murder of DeShawn McCray ===
As the attorney for Hakeem Curry, Bergrin was retained to represent a number of members of Curry's drug-trafficking organization, including Curry's cousin, William Baskerville. When Baskerville was arrested in November 2003, Bergrin spoke to him in jail and learned that Baskerville suspected the source of the government's evidence against him was DeShawn McCray, also known as Kemo. In a phone call to Curry which was intercepted by FBI agents, who were wiretapping Curry's cell phone, Bergrin said, "I got a chance to speak to William, and he said the informant is a guy by the name of K-Mo." Anthony Young later testified that about a week after Baskerville's arrest, he and other Curry organization members met with Bergrin, who told them that if McCray testified against Baskerville, Baskerville would "never see the streets again," but that Bergrin could get Baskerville out if McCray did not testify. Young testified that Bergrin told them, "no Kemo, no case," and as he left, he pointed his finger at the group and repeated once more, "no Kemo, no case."

Alberto Castro, a drug dealer also represented by Bergrin, later testified that Bergrin offered him $10,000 to "put a hit on" McCray. Castro said that as he was making $20,000 to $25,000 a week selling drugs at the time, he did not need the money, and he refused the offer. On March 2, 2004, while McCray was walking with another person on a busy Newark street, a heavyset black male with dreadlocks confronted the pair, shot McCray three or four times, and then fled in a car. McCray was pronounced dead at the scene.

The U.S. Attorney's Office moved to have Bergrin removed from Baskerville's case because of his disclosure of the informant's identity, fearing that Bergrin's counsel would be a potential ground for appeal after Baskerville was convicted. Bergrin said that although the informant's name was withheld in the complaint against Baskerville, the details included of the dates and quantities of his drug purchases as well as the date he was arrested made his identity clear, and that he had passed on McCray's name pursuant to his duty to evaluate evidence against his client, including the credibility of witnesses. Bergrin denied that he, Curry, and Baskerville had anything to do with McCray's death, saying that McCray was informing on several drug dealers and many people had a motive to kill him, and also suggested that the real reason for the motion to remove him from the case was retaliation for his vigorous defense of his clients, saying, "when you're constantly battling prosecutors and law enforcement officers who are your adversaries, sometimes you make enemies." Bergrin withdrew from the case in December; federal prosecutors charged Baskerville with conspiracy to murder McCray in March 2005, but Bergrin was not yet charged with a crime.

=== Pozo and Esteves murder plots ===
Richard Pozo, a large-scale cocaine trafficker, retained Bergrin to represent him after he was indicted in February 2004. Bergrin determined that Pozo's co-defendant, Pedro Ramos, was cooperating with the government against Pozo. Pozo later testified that Bergrin asked him if he knew where Ramos lived, and said, "if we know where he is, we can take him out and all our headaches will go away," to which Pozo responded, "are you nuts?" Pozo retained new counsel.

Vicente Esteves, another drug trafficker, was arrested by federal agents in 2008, and retained Bergrin on the advice of a fellow inmate. Esteves later testified that Bergrin advised him to kill the witnesses, quoting Bergrin as saying, "there's no witnesses, there's no case." Esteves also testified that Bergrin helped him compile tax returns that would make his drug revenues look like legal income so he could use it to pay his bail, and arranged for Esteves' co-defendants to be represented by attorneys who were tasked with informing Bergrin if anyone decided to cooperate with the prosecution. Esteves said that Bergrin told him "it wasn't his first time." In conversations with Oscar Cordova, a federal informant who posed as a hit man while secretly recording their conversations, Bergrin told Cordova to kill an associate of Esteves called Junior the Panamanian, saying, "we gotta make it look like a robbery. It cannot under any circumstances look like a hit. ... We have to make it look like a home invasion robbery." Bergrin later claimed in court that he knew all along that Cordova was an informant, and was "role-playing" in these conversations.

=== Prostitution ring ===
In 2001, Bergrin met Jason Itzler, who called him after being arrested at Newark Liberty International Airport for trying to smuggle ecstasy into the United States. Itzler served seven months in jail for the drug charge and was released on parole in 2003, after which he founded a prostitution ring in Manhattan called NY Confidential. Itzler, though not a practicing attorney, had attended the same law school as Bergrin, and Bergrin helped Itzler meet the conditions of his parole, which required him to maintain legitimate employment, by fraudulently listing him as a paralegal in his office. Bergrin was paid as much as $5,000 a week in cash to launder the business' earnings through two shell companies, and enjoyed the prostitutes' services at the brothel's expense.

In 2005, authorities arrested Itzler, who pleaded guilty to money laundering and promoting prostitution in 2006, and was sentenced to 18 months in prison. Bergrin then took over the business for two months. During this time, authorities allege that Bergrin grossed $50,000 to $80,000, before payroll and other expenses. In 2007, Bergrin was arrested and charged with money laundering, conspiracy, promoting prostitution, and misconduct by an attorney, with the possibility of up to 25 years in prison. Bergrin's attorney suggested that he was the victim of retaliation from prosecutors on account of his work in criminal defense. An associate of Bergrin's firm later testified that he accompanied Bergrin as he appealed to the heads of several American and Sicilian Mafia families to "send a very strong message" to a potential witness who had damaging information about his role in the prostitution ring.

On May 4, 2009, he pleaded guilty to misdemeanor charges, and he was sentenced in September to time served (amounting to several hours awaiting processing), 3 years probation, and forfeiture of $50,000.

== Criminal indictments ==
In May 2009, Bergrin was arrested for conspiring to murder an informant in March 2004 to prevent his testimony against one of Bergrin's clients. From the time of this arrest until November 2009, Bergrin was held in a Special Housing Unit (SHU) by the U.S. Bureau of Prisons. A federal judge ordered his release into the general population (the main body of inmates).

On April 12, 2011, the Third Circuit Court of Appeals reinstated "RICO" racketeering charges against Bergrin, which had been dismissed by the trial court.

On June 6, 2011, Bergrin was charged with a multitude of federal criminal charges: a federal grand jury returned a 138-page, second superseding indictment against Bergrin, previously accused of heading a crime syndicate involved in bribery, mortgage fraud and murder of a witness, now adding racketeering charges.

Bergrin's first trial in 2011, on a portion of the charges, ended in a hung jury. The trial judge was William J. Martini, Bergrin was represented by Larry Lustberg of Gibbons P.C. Robert A. Mintz, of the Newark firm McCarter & English was appointed receiver for Bergrin's law practice. In 2012, the Third Circuit permitted the government to introduce evidence of another occasion when Bergrin had allegedly plotted the murder of a witness, who planned to testify against Richard Pozo.

On March 18, 2013, a jury convicted attorney Bergrin of all 23 counts on which he was tried, including conspiracy to murder a witness and other racketeering, cocaine and prostitution offenses. The U.S. Attorney for New Jersey, Paul J. Fishman, announced the verdict. "Bergrin's conduct was a stunning violation of his role as an officer of the court and a betrayal of his roots as a member of law enforcement", said U.S. Attorney Fishman. "Today, the jury returned the verdict compelled by the evidence and imposed the justice he deserved. We take no joy from his tragic fall, but I am extremely proud of the work done by those in my office and agents from the FBI, IRS and DEA that led to this just result."

Bergrin received a life sentence on September 23, 2013. On December 18, 2014, his convictions and sentences were upheld by a three-judge federal appeals panel. Bergrin was disbarred in New York in 2010, and in New Jersey in 2016.
