= Irek, Chishminsky District, Republic of Bashkortostan =

Irek Ирек
- Village
- Location within Bashkortostan Location within Russia
- Coordinates: 54°37′N 55°22′E
- Country: Russia
- Region: Bashkortostan
- District: Chishminsky District
- Time zone: UTC+5:00

Irek (Russian: Ирек; Bashkir: Ирек, İrek) is a rural locality (a village) in Arslanovsky Selsoviet, Chishminsky District, Bashkortostan, Russia. The population was 125 as of 2010. There is 1 street.

== Geography ==
Irek is located 5 km north of Chishmy, the district's administrative seat. Chishmy is the nearest rural locality.
