= Ibrahim Suleiman Adnan Adam Harun =

Nigerien convicted murderer

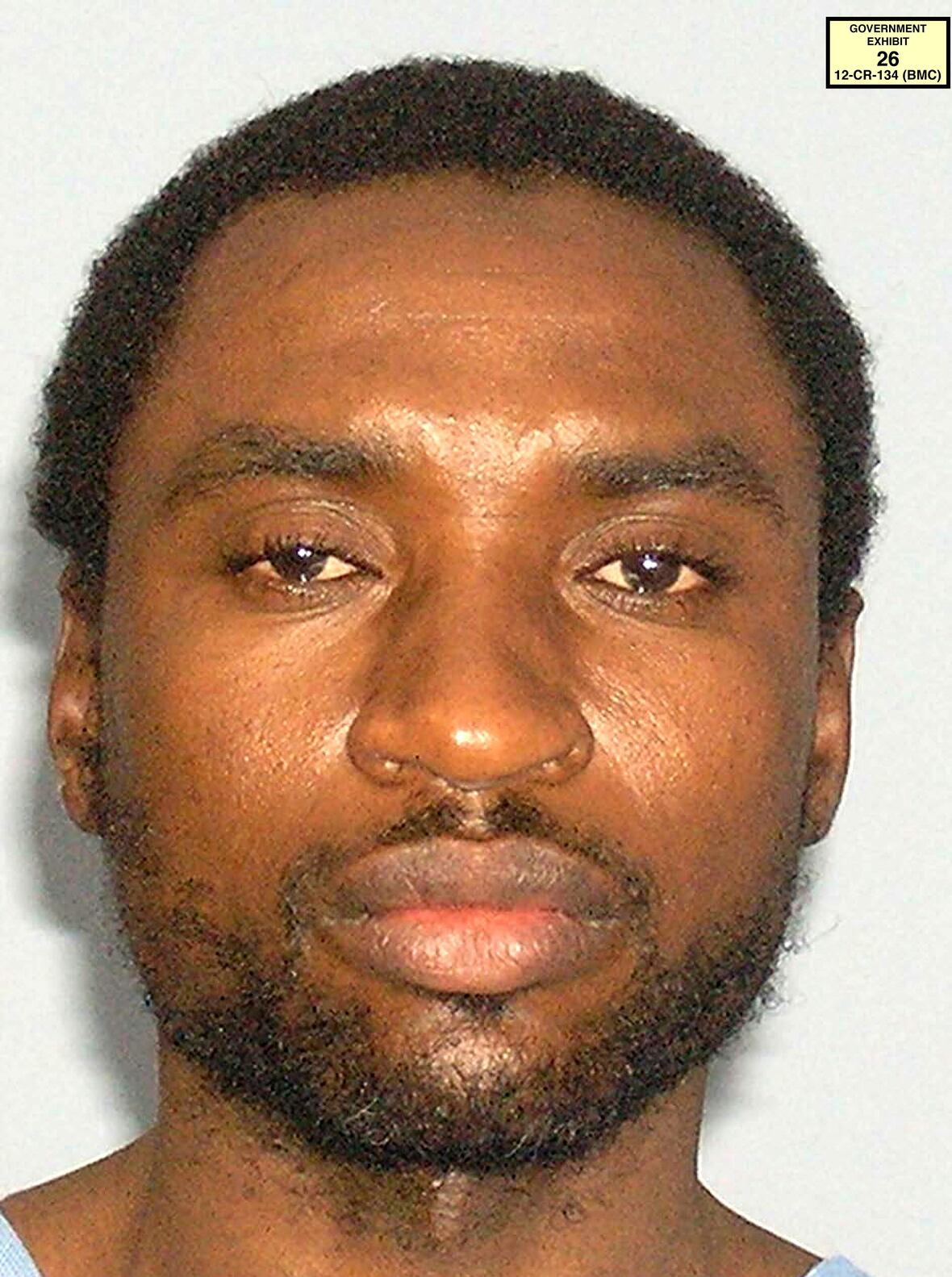
- Born: 1971 (age 54–55); Saudi Arabia
- Arrested: January 2005 (first); June 24, 2011 (second); Libya (first); Italy (second)
- Citizenship: Niger
- Detained at: ADX Florence, Colorado, US
- Other name: Spin Ghul (Note: His nom de guerre means "white rose" in Pashto, and is an ironic or racist reference to his African origin and dark skin.)
- Alleged to be a member of: Al-Qaeda
- Charges: conspiracy to murder U.S. nationals; conspiracy to bomb a U.S. government facility; conspiracy to provide material support to a foreign terrorist organization, al-Qaeda; providing and attempting to provide material support to al-Qaeda; use of explosives in connection with a felony offense.
- Penalty: Life imprisonment

Ibrahim Suleiman Adnan Adam Harun, also known as Spin Ghul, is a Saudi-born citizen of Niger who was convicted for his role in the death of two U.S. soldiers in 2003.

== Early life in Saudi Arabia ==
Harun was born in Saudi Arabia to foreign workers from Niger. It was in Saudi Arabia that he formed his support for jihadism, and from where he is reported to have left to undertake military training at a training camp in Afghanistan. He is reported to have arrived in Afghanistan shortly before al-Qaeda perpetrated the September 11 attacks in 2001.

== 2003 firefight ==
Harun was said to have been part of a force that ambushed a group of American soldiers that included Jerod Dennis and Ray Losano, and wounded three other men. Harun was said to have been wounded, during the attack, but was able to escape to Pakistan.

== Contact with al-Qaeda leaders ==
Harun met with Abu Faraj al-Libi and Abdul Hadi al-Iraqi – two senior al-Qaeda leaders. It was at this point that he joined al-Qaeda and swore an oath – bayat – to obey Osama bin Laden. They delegated him to travel to Nigeria to lead an attack on the United States Embassy in Abuja. According to Tom Hays, reporting for the Associated Press, Harun then traveled to Africa, where he had some involvement in a plot to bomb a U.S. embassy.

Harun was first tied to the deaths of the American soldiers when a copy of the Quran a surviving GI found on the battlefield, and kept, as a souvenir, was found to contain Harun's fingerprints.

== Arrest and legal battle ==
The DOJ describes Harun fleeing Nigeria when one of his contacts was apprehended, and he believed the plot's secrecy was compromised. They assert he fled to Libya, from where he planned to travel to Europe. Libyan security officials however arrested Harun first, in January 2005, and held him until June 2011, when the Muammar Gaddafi regime was overthrown.

Harun then fled Libya immediately, boarding refugee ship Excelsior which carried 1200 North African refugees from an island on the Mediterranean Sea to Taranto, Italy on June 24, 2011. On board, he proclaimed himself to be an al-Qaeda member, attacked law enforcement officers and was arrested. In Italy, the government conducted three days of audio-recorded interviews in the presence of an Italian judge and defense counsel. Tom Hays, of the Associated Press, reported that Harun confessed to playing a role in the 2003 firefight when he was in Italian custody.

Harun was indicted in the United States on February 21, 2012. On July 5, 2012, the Naples Court of Appeals found the defendant extraditable, pursuant to the bilateral extradition treaty between the United States and Italy. The Italian Minister of Justice ordered his extradition on September 14, 2012, to face the charges in the Eastern District of New York. He was extradited to US on October 4, 2012, and arrainged in federal court in Brooklyn the next day.

There was concern over Harun's sanity, but experts in mental health testified that he had the basic mental competency to stand trial. Nevertheless, he is reported to have insisted he was a "warrior", and tried to insist he should be tried in the Guantanamo military commission system. He is reported to have refused to appear in court or discuss his case with his lawyers, because he was not being tried in Guantanamo.

His trial lasted two weeks, but it only took his jury two hours to reach their verdict and found him guilty on March 16, 2017. Harun was convicted of all five counts, which included conspiracy to murder U.S. nationals; conspiracy to bomb a U.S. government facility; conspiracy to provide material support to a foreign terrorist organization, al-Qaeda; providing and attempting to provide material support to al-Qaeda; and use of explosives in connection with a felony offense.

He was sentenced to life in prison on February 16, 2018. As of 2026, Harun is serving his life sentence at ADX Florence, a federal supermax prison near Florence, Colorado.

Law Professor Karen Greenberg, the author of several books on Guantanamo, described Harun's case as significant, as it showed how trials in civilian courts could be successful, in contrast to the long delays, and confusion, when suspects were tried, in Guantanamo military commissions.
