= 2017 Pasquotank County prison murders =

Prison escape and murders in North Carolina, U.S.

- Date: October 12, 2017
- Location: Pasquotank Correctional Institution Pasquotank County, North Carolina, U.S.; 36.36156°N 76.31079°W
- Type: Prison escape attempt and mass murder by stabbing and bludgeoning
- Deaths: Justin Smith, 35; Veronica Darden, 50; Wendy Shannon, 49; Geoffrey Howe, 31
- Injuries: 12
- Convicted: Mikel Brady, 28; Wisezah Buckman, 29; Jonathan Monk, 30; Seth Frazier, 33
- Verdict: Guilty
- Convictions: First degree murder (all 4)
- Sentence: Brady; Death (2019); Buckman; Death (2023); Monk; Death (2025); Frazier; 4 consecutive life sentences without possibility of parole (2025)

On October 12, 2017, a group of four inmates attempted to escape from the Pasquotank Correctional Institution in Pasquotank County, North Carolina, United States, which resulted in the murders of two correctional officers and two prison employees. The four accused – Wisezah Buckman, Jonathan Monk, Seth Frazier, and Mikel Brady – were all arrested and charged with multiple counts of first degree murder.

Brady, who masterminded the escape attempt, was found guilty and sentenced to death in 2019. Buckman and Monk were both convicted for their respective roles in the quadruple murder and sentenced to death in 2023 and 2025 respectively. Frazier was sentenced to life in prison without parole, after pleading guilty to the murders in 2025.

== Prison escape and murder ==
On October 12, 2017, four inmates detained at the Pasquotank Correctional Institution attempted to conduct a prison escape, which led to the murders of four prison staff members and many others injured.

On that day at 3pm, at the prison's sewing plant, the four perpetrators set a fire as a diversion, and using tools gathered from the prison's sewing factory, the four inmates attacked several prison staff members and their fellow prisoners by stabbing and beating them, before their escape attempt failed. As a result of the attack, two prison staff members, 35-year-old Corrections Officer Justin Smith and 50-year-old correction enterprises manager Veronica Darden, were mortally wounded and died on the day of the incident. Another four prisoners and ten prison staff members were injured during the attack, with three of the prison employees being hospitalized while in critical condition.

As a result of the attack, the prison compound and nearby schools were placed on lockdown while searches were conducted for possible prison escapees, before it was confirmed that none of the prisoners had successfully escaped. At the time of the prison attack, 729 inmates were detained in Pasquotank Correctional Institution.

On October 30, 2017, 49-year-old Correctional Officer Wendy Shannon succumbed to her injuries and died in the hospital, therefore becoming the third fatality of the prison attack.

On November 3, 2017, 31-year-old Geoffrey Howe, the prison's maintenance mechanic, died at Sentara Norfolk General Hospital, and was thus the fourth and final victim to die in this case.

Autopsy reports revealed that all the four deceased victims suffered from multiple stab wounds and blunt force injuries. Smith was reportedly stabbed 67 times (including 45 stab wounds to his body) and sustained a total of 32 blunt force injuries to his head and neck. Shannon died from an anoxic brain injury caused by the blunt force trauma to her head. Howe himself died due to extensive brain and skull injuries, and also lost his left eye due to the brutality of the attack. Darden, who died due to a fatal slicing wound on her neck, also had 13 blunt force injuries to her head.

== Charges ==
On October 20, 2017, a week after the prison attack, the four prisoners – 28-year-old Mikel Brady, 29-year-old Wisezah Buckman, 30-year-old Jonathan Monk and 33-year-old Seth Frazier – were charged with murder for the killings they committed throughout the attack.

In June 2018, it was confirmed that all the four accused would undergo separate trials for the 2017 prison murders.

On October 13, 2018, District Attorney Andrew Womble confirmed that he would seek the death penalty for all the four inmates. Under North Carolina state law, the death penalty was the maximum sentence for first degree murder.

== Perpetrators ==
=== Mikel Brady ===
Mikel Edward Brady II (born March 11, 1989), the ringleader of the prison escape and murders, originally came from Randolph, Vermont, where he was born and raised. Brady reportedly had an unhappy childhood marred by abuse. He was born to a teenage mother and raised by a physically abusive father. From an early age, Brady suffered from developmental issues and was later diagnosed with bipolar disorder and post-traumatic stress disorder (PTSD). Despite these diagnoses, Brady's father was reportedly against him taking prescribed medications, preventing him from receiving proper treatment during his formative years.

Brady's descent into criminal behavior began during his teenage years. He became involved in a drug and burglary ring responsible for numerous break-ins in the Randolph area. In 2008, he was arrested for stealing 209 sticks of dynamite from a quarry in Bethel, Vermont. The following year, in 2009, he was charged in connection with a violent home invasion in South Royalton that left the victim with a severe brain injury. Attempting to evade the law, Brady fled to Mexico, but he was eventually captured, extradited, and imprisoned in Vermont.

After serving the minimum sentence and demonstrating good behavior behind bars, Brady was released in 2012. For a brief period, it seemed as though he was turning his life around. He found employment at a butcher shop in Randolph, joined a local softball league, and began taking his medications consistently. During this time, his girlfriend became pregnant, and the couple welcomed a son.

However, this period of stability did not last. In 2013, Brady was caught attempting to poach deer. Instead of facing the consequences, he fled Vermont while still on furlough, violating the terms of his release. He eventually settled in North Carolina. In February of that year, Brady was pulled over for a seatbelt violation and responded by shooting State Trooper Michael Potts four times. The officer survived, but the attack led to Brady receiving a 24-year prison sentence at the Pasquotank Correctional Institution for state charges of attempted murder. Additionally, Brady was convicted of federal charges of felony possession of firearms for the same shooting incident, and he was sentenced to 40 years in federal prison by Chief United States District Judge William Lindsay Osteen Jr., although he remained in North Carolina serving his sentence for the state charges for which he was convicted.

=== Wisezah Buckman ===
Wisezah Datawn Buckman (born November 12, 1987) was a resident of Elizabeth City, North Carolina. Although details of his life before the murders were sparse, Buckman was said to have come from a dysfunctional family background, which purportedly caused him to suffer from cognitive impairments in later life. Buckman was also married with three young children prior to his incarceration.

The 2017 prison murders were not the first time Buckman had committed murder. Three years prior, in 2014, Buckman was charged with first degree murder for the fatal shooting of 36-year-old Thurmont Deant Davis, for which he originally faced a maximum sentence of life without parole. Due to a plea agreement in 2015, Buckman was convicted of a lesser charge of second degree murder and sentenced to a prison term of 26 to 32 years in the Pasquotank Correctional Institution.

=== Jonathan Monk ===
Jonathan Michael Monk (born February 2, 1987), originally from North Carolina, was born to an 18-year-old mother and 24-year-old father. From the beginning, Monk's home life was marked by instability and abuse. According to testimony, his mother was abused by his father, and after their eventual divorce, Monk's father left the family. Following the separation, Monk's mother, who was neglectful towards Monk and his siblings, frequently moved the family and had a series of boyfriends, at least one of whom was consistently abusive toward Monk, his mother, and his siblings. Despite the emotional instability, Monk experienced a brief period of emotional stability during his time in Terlingua, Texas, where a former teacher described him as becoming part of her family. He showed talent in gymnastics and formed close friendships that brought some normalcy to his youth.

Monk joined the U.S. Army at the age of 17, due to his family members previously serving in the military. He served two deployments in Afghanistan, where he experienced combat-related trauma. During his second deployment, he faced personal crises including a second divorce caused by his wife's infidelity and disciplinary action for violating military alcohol rules. His brother and others described a noticeable change in his behavior upon his return, marked by heavy drinking, poor sleep, and erratic behavior.

In 2011, Monk was convicted of attempted first degree murder for a brutal knife attack on Tabatha Dupree, the wife of a fellow soldier and friend named Justin Dupree. Though he claimed to have had a delusional episode triggered by PTSD and believed his children were in danger, Monk was sentenced to 13 years in prison, and was incarcerated at the Pasquotank Correctional Institution.

=== Seth Frazier ===
Seth Jameson Frazier (born May 20, 1984), the oldest of all the four perpetrators, was a registered sex offender who was incarcerated at the time of the murders. He had a prior conviction in 2008 related to 2006 sodomy and rape of a 14-year-old girl and served 24 months in prison. After his release, Frazier reoffended in 2011 and was convicted of burglary and attempted sexual assault of another 14-year-old girl in Onslow County, North Carolina. He received a sentence of 84 to 110 months for first degree burglary, along with an additional term of 17 to 21 months (consecutive) for firearm possession by a felon. Frazier was serving his sentence at the Pasquotank Correctional Institution at the time of the killings.

== Trials ==
=== Brady ===
In February 2019, the trial of Mikel Brady was scheduled for October 7, 2019, making Brady the first of the four set to stand trial for the 2017 prison attack.

On October 21, 2019, Brady was found guilty of all four counts of first degree murder and ten other lesser charges, including attempted escape, assault with a deadly weapon and arson. The offence of first degree murder carries a sentence of either life imprisonment without the possibility of parole or the death penalty under North Carolina state law.

During the sentencing trial, the defence argued for Brady to be sentenced to life imprisonment, citing the details of Brady's troubled childhood and past medical history of his psychiatric conditions. Brady's lawyer, Thomas Manning, summarized Brady's childhood into a poem, "As the twig is bent, so goes the tree". On the other hand, the prosecution sought the death penalty, with District Attorney Andrew Womble citing the brutality of the attack and aggravating factors in the case. Womble also quoted that if the jury settled on life imprisonment, "it will be open season on corrections officers in this state."

On October 28, 2019, 30-year-old Mikel Brady was sentenced to death upon the jury's unanimous recommendation for capital punishment, making Brady the 143rd inmate to be condemned to death row in North Carolina; a total of 142 inmates were held on death row in North Carolina at the time of Brady's sentencing.

After he was sentenced to death, Brady was at first held on death row at the Central Prison in Raleigh, North Carolina. On December 31, 2019, due to safety concerns, Brady was transferred to the USP Big Sandy, a federal prison in Kentucky. In 2021, Brady was transferred to ADX Florence, a supermax federal prison in Colorado. As of 2025, Brady remains incarcerated at Florence.

=== Buckman ===
Wisezah Buckman was the second out of the four to stand trial for the prison attack. Originally, Buckman was slated to be tried in 2020 for the murders, but due to the COVID-19 pandemic in the United States and other reasons, the trial was delayed multiple times until Buckman was finally put on trial in October 2023.

On October 19, 2023, Buckman was found guilty of all four counts of first degree murder and ten other felony charges.

On November 3, 2023, 35-year-old Wisezah Buckman was sentenced to death, after the jury unanimously recommended three death sentences for three of the murders, while they voted for life without parole for the murder of the fourth victim, Veronica Darden.

In 2025, Buckman was transferred from Central Prison to ADX Florence, the same federal prison where Brady is imprisoned.

=== Monk ===
On February 14, 2025, Jonathan Monk became the third offender of the case to stand trial for the 2017 Pasquotank County prison murders. Jury selection lasted from February to March 2025.

On March 18, 2025, the jury found Monk guilty of all 13 criminal charges, including four counts of first degree murder.

During the sentencing phase, the defence sought to seek mercy for Monk and implored the jury to sentence Monk to life without parole, on account of Monk's troubled childhood, caused by his mother's neglect and that his early exposure to abuse caused long-lasting psychological issues to him while growing up.

On March 27, 2025, 38-year-old Jonathan Monk was sentenced to death by Judge Jeffery B. Foster upon the jury's unanimous recommendation for capital punishment. Apart from the four death sentences, Monk also received 60 to 81 years in prison for attempted first degree murder, felony burning a public building, felony attempted escape, and felony riot. Monk was transferred into the Federal Bureau of Prisons system and was held at USP Lee briefly before joining Brady and Buckman at ADX Florence on December 23, 2025.

=== Frazier ===
On September 29, 2025, Seth Frazier, then 41 years old, pleaded guilty to four counts of first degree murder, one count of attempted first degree murder, six counts of assault with a deadly weapon with the intent to kill inflicting serious injury, and one count each of burning a public building, inciting riot, attempting escape and assault with a deadly weapon.

As a result of his plea of guilt, Frazier was spared the death sentence and instead sentenced to four consecutive life sentences without parole for all four murder charges, plus 93 to 116 years for all the lesser offences he admitted to. Similarly to his co-defendants, Frazier was transferred into the federal prison system and is currently at USP Terre Haute.

== Aftermath ==
In the aftermath of the incident, security protocols at the facility were strengthened, including tighter restrictions on tool access. The North Carolina prison system also improved safety by equipping guards with body armor and providing supervisors with tasers. On October 12, 2022—the fifth anniversary of the failed escape—staff at Pasquotank held a moment of silence and released balloons in remembrance.

== See also ==
- Capital punishment in North Carolina
- List of death row inmates in the United States § North Carolina
