= Bishop International Airport attack =

2017 stabbing in Flint, Michigan, US

Coordinates: 42.9736°N 83.7389°W

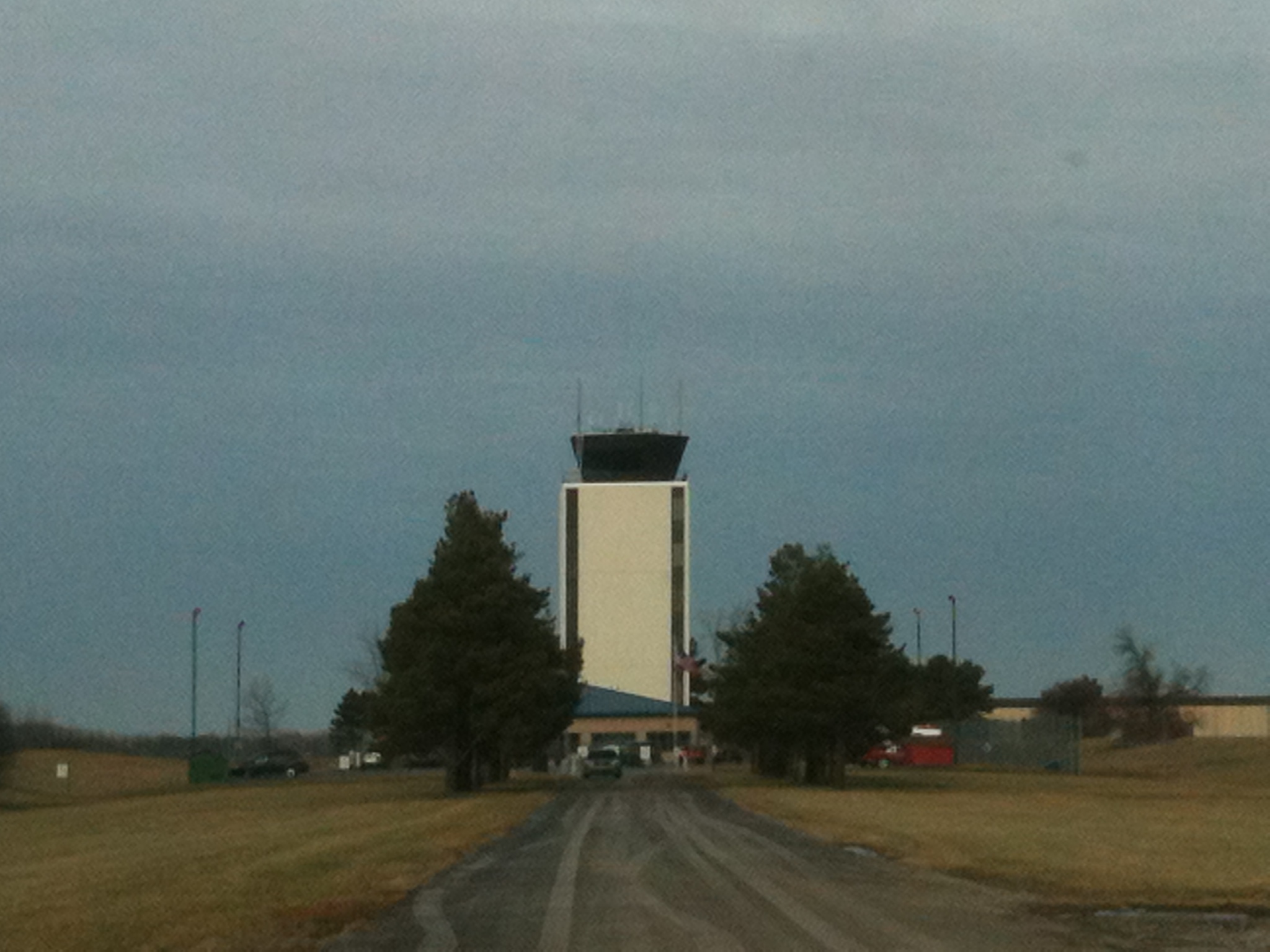
- Bishop International Airport Air Traffic Control Tower in 2012
- Location: Bishop International Airport; 3425 W. Bristol Rd. Flint, Michigan 48507
- Date: June 21, 2017; 9:45 am (Eastern)
- Attack type: Stabbing, terrorism
- Weapon: Knife
- Deaths: 0
- Injuries: 2
- Victims: Airport Police Lieutenant Jeff Neville; Airport Maintenance Worker Richard Krul
- Perpetrator: Amor Ftouhi
- Motive: See motives
- Verdict: Life in prison
- Convictions: Violence at an international airport Interfering with airport security Committing an act of terrorism transcending national boundaries

On June 21, 2017, airport police Lieutenant Jeff Neville was stabbed in the neck at Bishop International Airport in the city of Flint, Michigan, in the United States. The assailant, Amor Ftouhi, yelled, "Allahu akbar" during the attack. Ftouhi was travelling on a Canadian passport. Numerous law enforcement agencies responded and the airport was evacuated. Bomb sniffing dogs searched the evacuated airport for evidence of a larger-scale attack, but found nothing. Ftouhi was charged with committing violence at an international airport and interfering with airport security. He was later charged with committing an act of terrorism transcending national boundaries. He was found guilty of all three charges in November 2018, and was sentenced to life in federal prison in April 2019.

== Perpetrator ==
Amor M. Ftouhi, a truck driver born in Tunisia who lived in Montreal, Quebec, Canada, perpetrated the attack. Ftouhi entered the U.S. at the Champlain, New York port of entry five days before the attack. He is a dual citizen of Tunisia and Canada. Friends and associates described Ftouhi as "a quiet guy" and "a nice person" who was "socially positive".

== Investigation ==
Ftouhi cooperated with investigators. The weapon was described as a 12 inches (30 cm) knife that had an 8 inches (20 cm) serrated blade labelled as an "Amazon Survival Jungle". The FBI later told reporters Ftouhi twice tried and failed to buy a gun in Michigan, once on June 18, and then on the day of the attack.

Canadian law enforcement agencies also raided his apartment in Montreal and questioned three people there.

== Trial ==
On July 5, 2017, a federal grand jury indicted Ftouhi for interference with airport security.

On March 21, 2018, Ftouhi was charged with committing an act of terrorism transcending national boundaries.

Ftouhi's attorney had originally planned to present a mental-capacity defense, but before trial withdrew plans to offer this defense. Before trial, Ftouhi's lawyer filed a motion to change the trial location from Flint to Detroit due to their concern that pre-trial publicity would bias the potential jurors; the motion was denied.

Jury selection was completed on November 6, 2018 and opening statements began the next day.

Ftouhi was found guilty of all charges on November 13, 2018, following a five-day jury trial. He was sentenced to life in prison on April 18, 2019. Ftouhi is currently serving his sentence at ADX Florence, the federal supermax in Florence, Colorado.

== Motives ==
The FBI Agent in charge told reporters Ftouhi said something to the effect of, "You have killed people in Syria, Iraq, Afghanistan and we're all going to die." Ftouhi reportedly asked police why they didn't kill him. Court documents obtained by the media in 2017 say Ftouhi told investigators he had planned to kill a police officer and then take the officer's gun to kill more officers. The documents revealed Ftouhi subscribed to the ideology of Al-Qaeda founder Osama bin Laden and that he celebrated the attacks of September 11, 2001. He said that he considers the U.S. an enemy of Allah and that others like him would be coming to harm the country.

At trial however, federal prosecutors alleged Ftouhi plotted the attack because of financial difficulties and wanted to kill a police officer and then be killed to get into heaven. Investigators found a handwritten will and testament in a safe in an apartment closet in Montreal that said Ftouhi loved his wife and children, but he was struggling finding a job and was feeling shame, humiliation and remorse that he had a large amount of debt.

== Victims ==
Bishop International Airport Authority Police Lieutenant Jeff Neville (also a retired Genesee County Sheriff's deputy) was stabbed in the neck. After undergoing surgery, his condition was upgraded from critical to stable. On June 26, 2017 he was discharged from the hospital.

Airport maintenance worker Richard Krul was cut on the hand while attempting to subdue Ftouhi.

== Responses ==
U.S. Attorney General Jeff Sessions issued a statement about the incident: "I want to assure all our law enforcement across the nation, any attack on someone who serves and protects our citizens will be investigated and prosecuted to the fullest extent of the law. I am proud of the swift response from the F.B.I. and our federal prosecutors and their partnership with local police and the Canadian authorities. Our prayers are with the officer and his family for a full recovery."

Canadian Public Safety Minister Ralph Goodale called the incident a "heinous and cowardly attack".

Michigan Governor Rick Snyder reacted with a series of tweets: "Even with this attack, we must continue to balance our need for increased security with understanding and tolerance". "I want to thank all law enforcement officers and first responders who assisted at the scene today." "I am heartened to hear that Lieutenant Jeff Neville is expected to make a full recovery."

Lieutenant Neville was honored at the Fenton Fourth of July Parade where he spoke about the incident publicly for the first time, telling reporters, "That guy was up against more than what he thought he was up against, you know. Really. He picked the wrong airport."

The Flint Islamic Center gave Lieutenant Neville a check for $10,000 after a prayer service at the airport, while saying about Ftouhi, "He is against our Islam, against our principal, against all values that we hold."

Lieutenant Neville was also honored by the American Muslim Law Enforcement Officers of New York and New Jersey.

Airport maintenance worker Richard Krul, who helped restrain Ftouhi and was cut on the hand, was also given awards for his actions.

On March 12, 2018, the Genesee County Board of Commissioners honored Chief Christopher Miller, Lieutenant Dan Owen, Officer Chris Curnow, airport employee Richard Krul and Joe Garza for their efforts after the attack.

On March 24, 2018, airport firefighters Lieutenant Daniel Owen, Michael Chilson, and Christopher Tolan were named firefighters of the year by the Genesee County Association of Fire Chiefs for their lifesaving efforts after the attack.
