= Jason Itzler =

American businessman, pimp, and convicted criminal

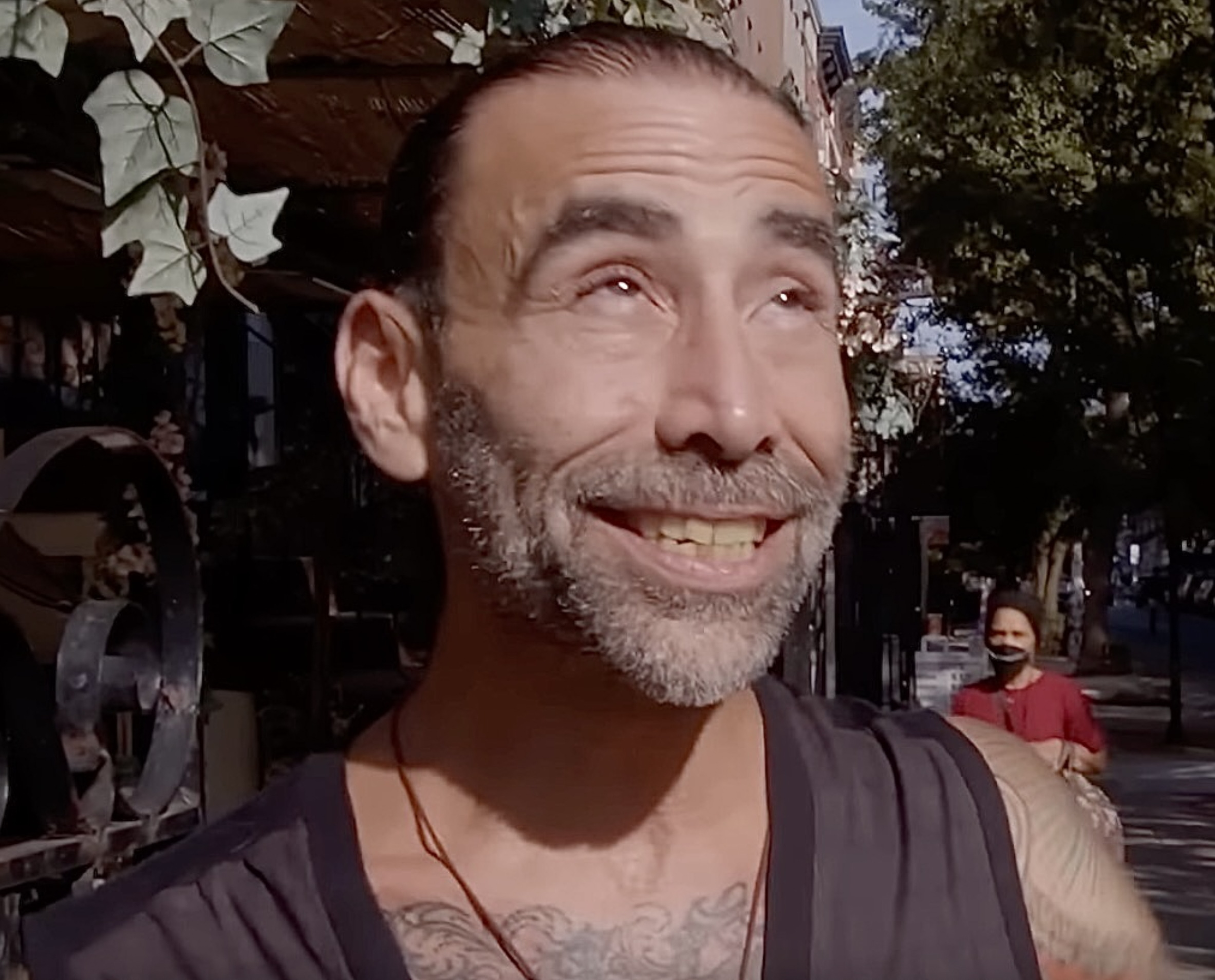
- Itzler sungazing, 2024
- Born: Jason Lubell Sylk; February 23, 1967 (age 59); Philadelphia, Pennsylvania, United States
- Other names: Jaeson Lubell, Mr. Based, "The King of All Pimps"
- Education: George Washington University (B.A.); Shepard Broad College of Law (J.D.)
- Occupations: Livestreamer, former Prostitution ringleader
- Known for: Running a prostitution ring, Live streaming on Kick and Parti
- Height: 5 ft 9 in (175cm)
- Status: Released
- Convictions: Assault; Promoting prostitution Drug trafficking (conspiracy to distribute a controlled substance - MDMA); Criminal sale of a controlled substance Money laundering
- Website: pussy.com (pre-1997) nyconfidential.com (2004-2005) dnadiamonds.com (2007-2008) wots.live (2025-present)

Jason Lubell Itzler (né Sylk; born February 23, 1967), also known as Mr. Based, is an American livestreamer, felon, and former prostitution ringleader and pornographer. Itzler has an extensive criminal record, having been imprisoned multiple times for drug crimes, prostitution, assault, and money laundering and having been charged with aggravated assault with a weapon, burglary, and stalking in Florida.

== Early life and education ==
Jason Lubell Itzler was born as Jason Lubell Sylk and is the only son of Leonard Allen Sylk and Ronnie Lubell. Itzler is of Jewish descent. Following his parents' divorce, Itzler moved to New York with his mother. While growing up, Jason was influenced by his grandfather, Nathan Lubell, who was a founding partner in the Riviera in Las Vegas. Jason's mother remarried a lawyer, Ron Itzler, and they later moved to the suburbs of New Jersey. Itzler attended a number of private schools in his youth, including the Elisabeth Morrow School, the Dwight-Englewood School, and the Hotchkiss School. Jason spent many of his evenings at the New York Friars Club, and summers in the Catskills, where he worked as a cabana boy at the Concord Hotel.

When his parents got divorced, Itzler lost connection with his biological father and grew extremely close to his mother. Itzler often spoke of how beautiful his mother was and often referred to her as "the original MILF".

Itzler's adoptive father, Ron Itzler later spoke on the topic of his adopted son, "You have to be ready for anything when it comes to Jason. Nothing surprises me anymore."

Itzler graduated from George Washington University with a degree in political science and art history. Itzler later enrolled in the Shepard Broad College of Law in the late 1980s and graduated with a J.D. in 1993. Itzler claimed at times to be an attorney, but never took the Bar exam.

== Early ventures, prostitution ring, and criminal record ==
While in law school, he started a phone sex operation called M2 Communications, Inc., where he would charge $4.98-a-minute, soon becoming a young millionaire. The company averaged $1,500,000 a month. Due to his mother's untimely death from cancer in 1994, he abandoned his business and was eventually forced to declare bankruptcy due to a lawsuit which according to Itzler, wiped out his "$20,000,000" net worth in 1997, leading to debt of "4 or 5 million dollars" and a suicide attempt. His next company was called SoHo Models, one of the first companies to supply webcam pornography, which he ran out of a rented 8,000-square-foot loft on the corner of Canal and Broadway in New York City.

Itzler was arrested in New Jersey in 2000 and again in 2003 for assaulting his then girlfriends. His 2003 arrest led to an assault conviction.

In 2001, Itzler was arrested at Newark Liberty International Airport for trying to smuggle 3,869 ecstasy pills into the United States from Amsterdam. After serving seven months in jail for the drug charge, he was released on parole in 2003, after which he started an escort service named New York Confidential. To meet the condition of his parole that he maintain legitimate employment, Itzler was fraudulently listed as a paralegal in the office of his attorney, Paul Bergrin.

In 2004, Itzler founded a prostitution ring advertised as an escort agency called New York Confidential. Itzler's prostitution ring was initially run out of his apartment in Hoboken, New Jersey. Itzler's prostitution ring quickly became the biggest in New York, leading to Itzler moving his base of operations to a 5000 sq ft. loft at 79 Worth Street in Manhattan. Itzler was averaging a gross of $55,000 a night while leading New York Confidential.

Itzler claims to have had 120 prostitutes working for him by the time he was caught, New York Confidential's website had 66 prostitutes listed working at its peak in Oct 2004, falling to just 26 by Mar 2005. Itzler claims to have had sex with about half of his prostitutes. Itzler, when asked about his success as a pimp stated, "...we were the best... At NY Confidential, I told my girls that the pressure is on them because we have to provide the clients with the greatest single experience ever, a Kodak moment to treasure for the rest of their lives. Spreading happiness, positive energy, and love, that's what being the best means to me. Call me a dreamer, but that's the NY Confidential credo." It was this attention to detail and customer satisfaction that made the group successful, attracting a wide array of clients, including senators and famous athletes.

According to Natalie McLennan, Itzler's top prostitute and then-girlfriend, Itzler's methodology for recruiting his prostitutes was predatory: "I would always get so mad at Jason when he'd try to lure young innocent girls right in front of me, or enlist me to help him... Jason would go on scouting tears in order to meet the demand. Like a hawk, he'd observe his prey, circle, then swoop in for the kill, or in his case, to make the vague, enticing promise of easy money."

Itzler was allegedly nearly thrown out of a window at a Canal Street building as he was held by his ankles as a result of an outstanding debt to a member of the Mafia during his tenure running New York Confidential.

When asked about the repercussions faced as a result of his ventures within New York Confidential, Jason stated, "The problem with NY Confidential was it didn't go far enough". There were even talks of expanding his prostitution ring to other cities, such as Las Vegas and Itzler's hometown, Philadelphia.

In Jan 2005, the New York City Police Department arrested Itzler and his business associate Hulbert Waldroup on charges of promoting prostitution, money laundering and drug possession. Itzler was wanted by authorities in two other states for stalking, drug possession, and breaking parole. According to court papers, police found heroin, cocaine, crack cocaine, ketamine and marijuana in Itzler's office. Itzler pleaded guilty to money laundering and promoting prostitution in 2006, and was sentenced to 18 months in prison.

Following Itzler's arrest, his attorney, Paul Bergrin, took control of New York Confidential and resumed operations without Itzler's approval. Bergrin reportedly laundered over $800,000 through credit cards from the proceeds of New York Confidential and developed a sex addiction centered around Itzler's prostitutes. Bergrin was later charged with promoting prostitution, money laundering, and conspiracy.

In March 2005, Itzler was transferred from The Tombs to Bellevue Psychiatric Hospital. In an interview while in the psychiatric ward, Itzler said, "If I'm found innocent, I plan to go back into business opening up escort agencies all over the country. But I'll base it in Costa Rica – to play it a little safe."

While imprisoned on Rikers Island in 2005, Itzler claimed to have had actor Charlie Sheen as a client. In a call to the New York Daily News tabloid, Itzler stated, "But, um, I also recently acknowledged that Charlie Sheen was my client. Tried to get him out of a little trouble, cause he's been seeing a transsexual and I wanted to help him out and show the world he's a normal guy and not a, not a pervert." The tabloid satirically awarded him the "Tireless Zeal for Self-Promotion Prize" from this report. Sheen's spokesman Stan Rosenfield denied that Sheen was ever involved with a transsexual. "If you choose to believe him, that is your problem," Rosenfield advised the tabloid.

Itzler ran a largely unsuccessful matchmaking service called "DNA Diamonds" from 2007 to 2008 where his primary goal was to attract wealthy bachelors to his matchmaking service. Itzler listed himself as "Dr. Jason Itzler, J.D." on his website for this business.

In 2007, a transsexual Rikers Island inmate known as "Angelina Jolie" sent him to the hospital. Itzler stated, "She walked up to me and said, 'If you don't shut your mouth, I'm going to break your face.' Even though she has a penis, she looks like a woman. I've never hit a woman in my life." Itzler was taken to Elmhurst Hospital Center in Queens, where he said a CAT scan found "severe brain trauma".

In 2010 Itzler shared an apartment in Flamingo Towers in Miami, Florida with Hungarian photographer Zoltan Present (then Prepszent). Itzler had previously faced several charges in Florida including stalking, burglary, and aggravated assault with a weapon. This apartment was subject to controversy when former University of Wisconsin-La Crosse student, Julia Sumnicht died in Miami in March 2010. As a result of an interview with Itzler while he was in a Manhattan jail where he faced other unrelated charges, Itzler claimed to have also taken GHB himself the night that Sumnicht had visited their apartment. Additionally, Sumnicht's body was only discovered after she had visited the apartment of a different photographer later that night.

A police report for Sumnicht's death said that after a detective identified himself in a call related to the investigation of Sumnicht's death, Itzler immediately hung up. A private investigator hired by the family of Sumnicht, Chris Catania, stated, "[Itzler] admitted to being in the apartment with Julia, and that he had consumed GHB himself. Knowing that Julia wouldn't have taken the drug on her own and that Itzler had access to it, you know, as an investigator, you put two-and-two together, and someone slipped Julia that drug."

In 2011, Itzler was arrested and arraigned by the Manhattan District Attorney, Cyrus Vance Jr., and the NYPD Organized Crime Investigation Division for prostitution and drug-related criminal offenses stemming from a scandal in which he claimed to have provided a prostitute and heroin to country musician Billy Ray Cyrus at Trump International Hotel in New York City. Itzler was running a second prostitution ring called "Rockstar Models & Party Girls". The judge decided to set Itzler's bail at $200,000 and suggested that Itzler have his head examined. An assistant district attorney, Eugene Hurley said that Itzler had been arrested many times in Miami, including for criminal charges like possessing weapons and trespassing.

On May 14, 2012, after his initial arraignment for his 2011 arrest, Itzler was sentenced to four years in prison for prostitution, money laundering, and drug charges after an investigation the previous summer found evidence that he had sold cocaine and provided a prostitute to a Manhattan customer.

== Livestreaming career (2023–present) ==
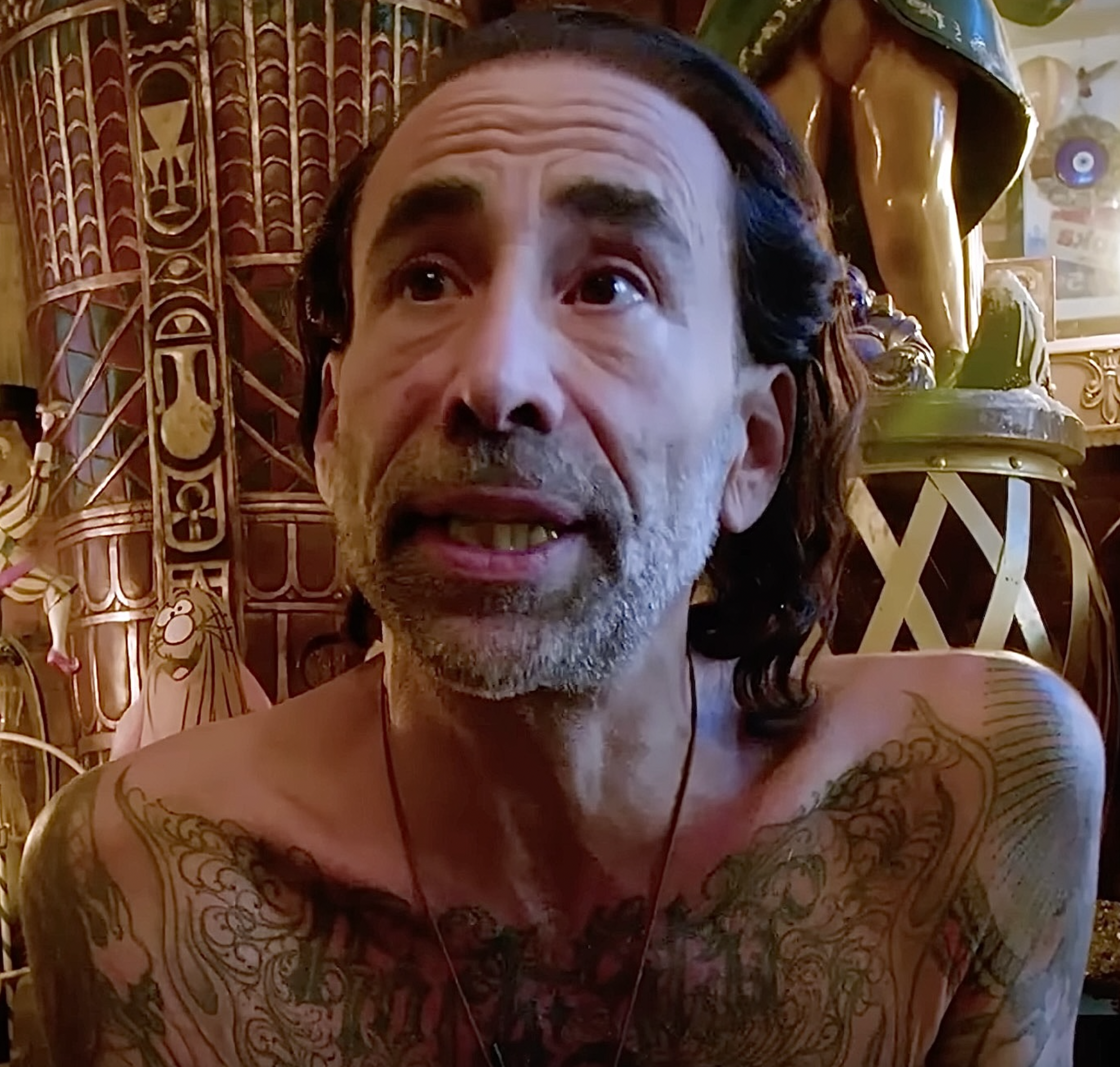
Itzler in his East Village apartment, 2024

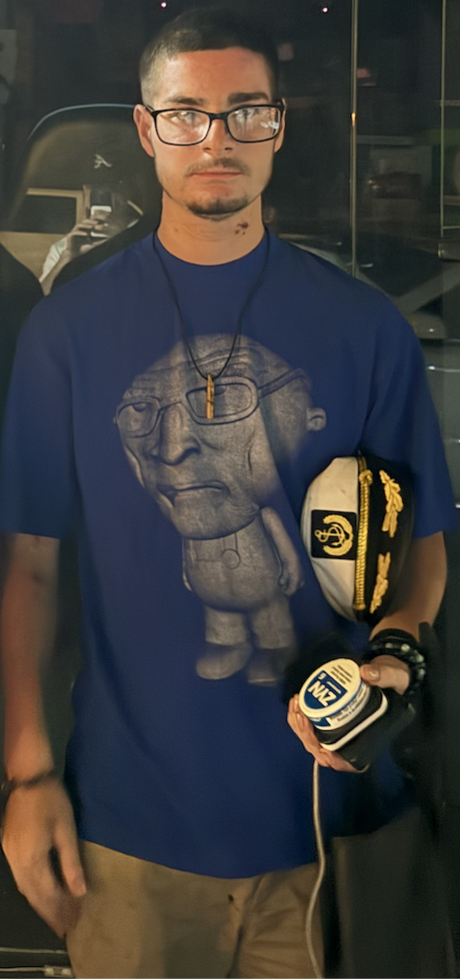
Joshua Block in 2024

In 2023, Itzler began an online live stream channel on Kick under the name "Mr. Based". Throughout 2024, he was a streaming partner and manager to Joshua Block, a popular TikTok creator and internet personality from Medford, New York known online as "World of T Shirts", who is often considered a "lolcow", an online term for someone who can be angered easily for laughs. Itzler labeled several co-streams as "Interactive Reality Shows", which revolved heavily around users' verbal harassment towards Block, who is autistic and suffers from alcoholism. In July 2024, YouTuber Alex Novell published a video on Sumnicht's death titled "When a Livestreamer Confesses to Murder" that included secretly recorded interviews with Itzler. On August 24, 2024, Itzler physically assaulted Novell in an incident near his apartment in the East Village neighborhood of Manhattan. Novell began bleeding significantly following the attack due to a severe laceration to his head, prompting widespread social media attention, reportedly going viral on X, with many internet personalities such as Keemstar covering the assault.

Novell sued Itzler in March 2024 through the Brooklyn Supreme Court for $250,000 for assaulting him. Itzler was facing harassment, criminal contempt and terroristic threat charges in two Brooklyn cases for allegedly threatening Novell and violating a restraining order filed against him by Novell. He was banned from Kick as a result, and moved to Parti, a smaller live streaming website. He would be banned from that website in 2025 as well, with the reason stated being "terroristic threats". In 2025, he created his own website, wots.live (wots stands for World Of T-shirts) which features a mixture of live streams involving him, Joshua Block, and other creators.

== Association with Jeffrey Epstein ==
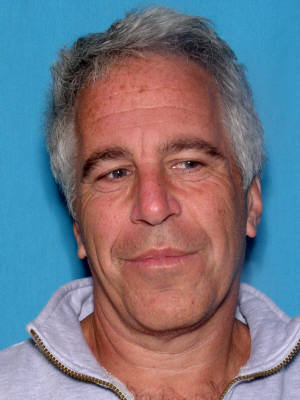
Mugshot of Jeffrey Epstein, 2009

Itzler claimed in a 2023 interview to have been a supplier of prostitutes to financier and prolific child sex offender Jeffrey Epstein. Itzler said that Epstein used cocaine at his townhouse in the Upper East Side with Itzler's prostitutes. Itzler held Epstein in high regard, stating that Epstein was a, "cool motherfucker... like, tall" and that "he [Epstein] dressed beautifully, he had the salt and pepper hair, he was very powerful, and he owned the hottest nightclub".

In the Jan 30, 2026 release of documents from the Epstein Files Transparency Act, Itzler's name was mentioned in two emails. The first, a forwarded email to Jeffrey Epstein from Henry Jarecki contained a New York Magazine article detailing Itzler's career as a pimp when he ran New York Confidential. Itzler was also mentioned in a Jan 2007 email in the Epstein files where both the recipient and sender were classified by the Department of Justice. The email, titled, "Look at this website about that guy I told you about" contained the following message:

"Hope all is well and you are still enjoying your vacation. Go to this site: http://www.jason-itzler.com/ this is the guy I told you about. He used to own an escort agency, his clients were wealthy people but his [sic] arrested now. His [sic] coming out soon and he will open a dating service company for wealthy people. Check the site. Miss ya"

== Personal life ==
Itzler has been engaged nine times, married twice, and has dated prostitutes he employed, including his number one prostitute, Natalie McLennan, also known as Natalia. McLennan made as much as $2,000 per hour with a two-hour minimum working as a prostitute at New York Confidential. When asked if the work affected her relationship with Itzler, Natalia says he would sometimes get jealous of the time she spent away from him, but not of the men. It would only bother Itzler if she slept with another man for free. In 2010, Natalia pleaded guilty to a charge of attempted money laundering in connection to New York Confidential.

Itzler has had Hanuman and "Super Lucky" tattooed on his arms since the early 1990s. Itzler currently lives in the East Village neighborhood of Manhattan and is a fervent advocate of the pseudoscientific practice of "sungazing". In a 2024 Kick stream, he stated he was a Hindu.

== Media ==
Itzler has been featured on The View. He appeared several times on The Opie and Anthony show, including phoning in from prison. He also appeared as a guest twice on The Howard Stern Show.

== See also ==
- Procuring (prostitution)
- Live streaming
