= Irek, Belebeyevsky District, Republic of Bashkortostan =

Irek Ирек
- Village
- Location within Bashkortostan Location within Russia
- Coordinates: 54°15′N 54°12′E
- Country: Russia
- Region: Bashkortostan
- District: Belebeyevsky District
- Time zone: UTC+5:00

Irek (Russian: Ирек; Bashkir: Ирек, İrek) is a rural locality (a village) in Tuzlukushevsky Selsoviet, Belebeyevsky District, Bashkortostan, Russia. The population was 86 as of 2010. There are 3 streets.

== Geography ==
Irek is located 20 km north of Belebey (the district's administrative centre) by road. Akkain is the nearest rural locality.
