= Pasquotank Correctional Institution =

State prison in North Carolina

- Interactive map of Pasquotank Correctional Institution
- Location: 527 Commerce Drive; Elizabeth City, North Carolina, U.S.
- Coordinates: 36.36156°N 76.31079°W
- Status: Open
- Security class: Close and minimum security
- Capacity: 896 total, 640 close, 256 minimum
- Opened: 1996
- Managed by: North Carolina Department of Correction
- Warden: Daniel Everett

Pasquotank Correctional Institution is a state prison in Elizabeth City, North Carolina.

The institution houses male close custody inmates and has a capacity of 896. There is also a 256-bed minimum security prison adjacent to the prison, which was funded by a $87.5 million prison construction program approved by the North Carolina General Assembly in July 1993.

On October 12, 2017, Pasquotank Correctional Institution became the site of the deadliest escape attempt in North Carolina history when four inmates attempted to escape from the facility, killing four facility employees in the process. Three of the four inmates involved in the escape attempt have been sentenced to death, while the remaining inmate was sentenced to life in prison without parole.

== History ==
Pasquotank Correctional Institution was dedicated on March 27, 1996. A $33.7 million construction project was funded in July 1991 as part of a $103 million prison construction program. The institution was built using the same design as Foothills and Marion correctional institutions in Western North Carolina.

=== 2017 escape attempt ===
On October 12, 2017, Pasquotank Correctional Institution became the site of the deadliest escape attempt in North Carolina history when four inmates used tools gathered from the prison's sewing factory to stab and bludgeon four facility employees to death, including two correctional officers, a correction enterprise manager, and a maintenance mechanic.

A total of fourteen people—four inmates and ten prison employees—were injured during the escape attempt, which began with inmates starting a fire in the facility's sewing plant around 3:00 p.m. Two employees, 35-year-old corrections officer Justin Smith and 50-year-old correction enterprises manager Veronica Darden, died of their injuries on the day of the incident. Two other facility employees, 49-year-old corrections officer Wendy Shannon and 31-year-old maintenance mechanic Geoffrey Howe, also died as a result of injuries sustained during the attack.

Both the facility and nearby schools were placed on lockdown during the escape attempt. A total of 729 inmates were present at the facility on the day of the attack.

Mikel Edward Brady II, one of the prisoners involved in the botched escape attempt, was charged with four counts of first-degree murder in connection with the incident, as well as prison escape, attempted murder, assault with a deadly weapon, and intent to kill. At the time of the failed escape, Brady had been in prison for the 2013 attempted murder of North Carolina Highway Patrol trooper Michael Potts, who had been shot four times. On October 14, 2019, just over two years after the incident occurred, Brady was found guilty of all 14 charges against him. The jury required just over half an hour of deliberation before returning with the verdict.

District attorney Andrew Womble alleged that the escape attempt and attack had been planned for three months, and that although three other inmates participated in the event and were charged with murder, Brady was the ringleader. Brady stated that he and the other inmates, who were incarcerated in the same part of the prison, had been planning the attack for months. They specifically chose a Thursday to launch the attempt because they knew that no one would be watching over the loading dock. Justin Smith, one of the four fatalities of the attack, had his radio stolen because Brady observed that Smith "was not a good communicator". According to Brady, he planned the escape because "prisoners were treated unfairly, and the race card was always thrown".

On October 28, 2019, Brady was sentenced to death for his role in the murders; the jury required just over an hour of deliberation to reach this decision.

On November 11, 2023, a second inmate, Wisezah Datwan Buckman, was sentenced to death for his role in the escape attempt. Buckman was originally sent to prison for the 2014 murder of Thurmont Davis.

Both Brady and Buckman are currently housed in the custody of the Federal Bureau of Prisons at ADX Florence; they will be transferred back to the custody of the North Carolina Department of Corrections when execution dates are set.

On March 26, 2025, a third inmate, Jonathan Monk, was sentenced to death for his involvement in the attempt. Monk had originally been in prison for the 2011 attempted murder of Tabitha Dupree, who was slashed with a knife at least 15 times. Dupree was the wife of Justin Dupree, who served in the military alongside Monk.

On September 29, 2025, the fourth and final inmate, Seth Frazier, pleaded guilty to first-degree murder and other charges for the escape attempt. He was then sentenced to life in prison without parole plus 93 to 116 years. Frazier, who was a previously convicted sex offender, had been in prison for a 2011 burglary at the time of the escape attempt and murders. In the burglary case, he attempted to sexually assault a 14-year-old girl, but was scared off when she awoke to him over her bed.

Following the incident, security measures at the institution were enhanced, including access to tools becoming more restricted. Likewise, the North Carolina prison system increased safety measures by issuing body armor to guards and Tasers to supervisors. On October 12, 2022, the fifth anniversary of the botched escape attempt, Pasquotank staff released balloons into the sky and observed a moment of silence.

== See also ==
- List of North Carolina state prisons
