= Irek Hamidullin =

Russian felon held in the United States

- Ирек Хамидуллин
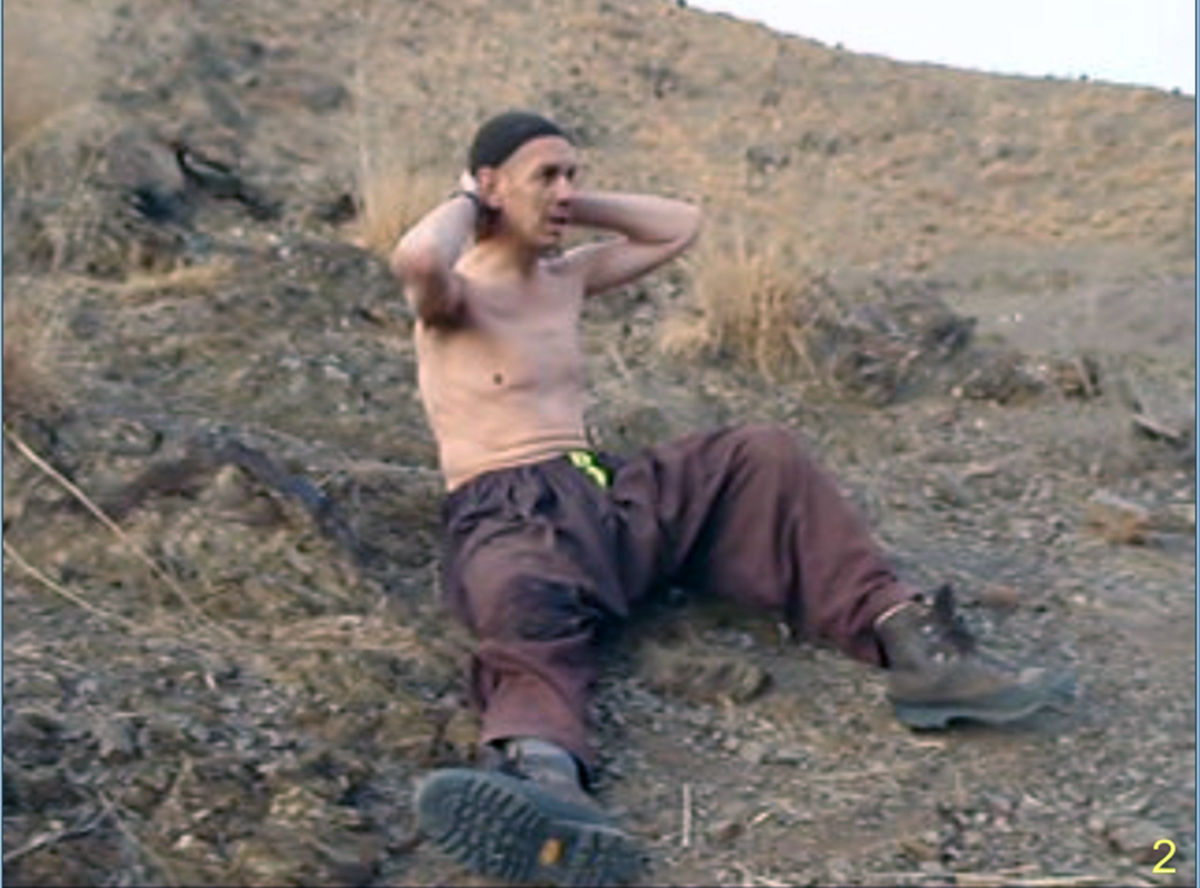
- Irek Hamidullin when he was captured on 29 November 2009

Personal details
- Born: Naberezhnye Chelny, Tatarstan, Soviet Union
- Education: Suvorov Military School

Military service
- Allegiance: Soviet Union (Afghanistan) Taliban
- Branch/service: Soviet Armed Forces
- Battles/wars: War in Afghanistan
- Criminal information
- Status: Incarcerated at ADX Florence
- Criminal charges: Material support, attempted murder of U.S. military personnel, conspiracy to use a weapon of mass destruction and possession of a firearm in connection with a crime of violence.
- Penalty: Life imprisonment plus 30 years

Irek Ilgiz Hamidullin (Russian: Ирек Хамидуллин) is a Russian militant who the United States authorities report they captured in Afghanistan in 2009. Hamidullin is said to be a nom de guerre of a Russian in his fifties, who, according to some, served in the Soviet Armed Forces, occupying Afghanistan, in the 1980s. His real name is not known, nor how he spent the decades between his life in the Soviet Union and his capture by U.S. forces, although American officials have said they believe he participated in "several" attacks on U.S. forces. When captured, it is reported that he was recovering from wounds.

== Early life ==
According to a 2004 report in the Moskovsky Komsomolets, Irek Hamidullin graduated from a Suvorov Military School in Kazan, and a tank officer training college in Leningrad. He left the Soviet Army in 1989, and became a businessman in Tatarstan's Naberezhnye Chelny, selling car parts. In 1996–98 he studied at a local madrasa named Yoldyz ("Star"), which was viewed by the local authorities as Wahhabi-influenced. He went to Chechnya in 1998–99, but became disappointed with the Chechens, as, in his view, they failed to follow the Shariah law. After returning to Tatarstan, he started looking for a place where Shariah is obeyed, and later in 1999 he went to Afghanistan with a group of like-minded Tatar Muslims.

== Militant career ==
In 2003, he was detained in Pakistan, accused of illegal crossing of the Afghanistan–Pakistan border, and spent around half a year in detention. After his release, he flew to Russia on 15 April 2004. He was interviewed by Russia's FSB, but no charges were laid; in the summer of 2004 it was reported that he was about to leave for Sudan.

The Washington Post reported in December 2013 that Hamidullah was one of the several dozen long term captives held in the Bagram Theater Internment Facility who were not citizens of Afghanistan.

The Washington Post reported the Hamidullah was considered one of the foreigners with the strongest evidence against him, and that the Department of Defense wanted to bring him to the United States, to face charges before a military commission like the controversial Guantanamo military commissions. They reported the DoD was planning to try to bring less than ten foreign captives from Afghanistan to the United States to face charges before a military commission. Quoting officials who would not put their name on record the Washington Post reported "He's pretty well-connected in the terrorist world," and that he had ties to Chechen rebels, and two Afghan opposition militias, and that he had declared he would "return to jihad," if released.

The U.S. Congress has restricted the U.S. President from bringing Guantanamo captives to U.S. territory—even those who had been determined not to have been enemy combatants, after all. But Congress didn't consider the possibility that captives held outside of Guantanamo might be brought to the US, so the restriction does not apply to them. United States Senators Saxby Chambliss and Lindsey Graham argued, instead, that men like Hamidullah should be sent to Guantanamo.

Human rights scholars and legal experts questioned whether it was appropriate to charge these men before the troubled and largely unprecedented military commission system, when the United States had successfully prosecuted hundreds of terrorists in the regular U.S. civilian justice system.

Marty Lederman, a Professor at Georgetown University, writing in Just Security, in December 2013, pointed out that, without regard to the speculation over whether he should face charges before a Military Commission, no one had given any indication as to what crime he had committed.

On 4 November 2014, Hamidullin was indicted by a grand jury on 12 federal charges, and three additional charges were subsequently filed in a superseding indictment. On 7 August 2015, he was found guilty on all charges. On 3 December 2015, he was sentenced to life in prison plus 30 years without parole.

== See also ==
- Soviet Afghan War
