= Richard Hammond's Engineering Connections =

- Title card
- Presented by: Richard Hammond
- Country of origin: United Kingdom
- No. of series: 3
- No. of episodes: 16

Production
- Running time: 50 minutes
- Production company: Darlow Smithson Productions

Original release
- Network: National Geographic Channel
- Release: 8 September 2008 – 12 June 2011

Richard Hammond's Engineering Connections is a British documentary series originally broadcast on the National Geographic Channel, and later on BBC2. It is presented by Richard Hammond, and looks at how engineers and designers use historic inventions and clues from the natural world in ingenious ways to develop new buildings and machines. The show's format is very similar to that of James Burke's 1978 documentary series, Connections. The first series premièred on 8 September 2008, on National Geographic, and on 1 March 2010, on BBC2. The first series contained four episodes. The second series premièred on 7 September 2009, on National Geographic, and on 8 May 2010, on BBC2. The second series contained six episodes. The third series premièred on 8 May 2011, on BBC2 and contained six episodes. The BBC2 broadcasts of the first two series have a slightly shorter running time and contain less information than the original National Geographic broadcasts, with on average one minute of footage cut from every episode. None of the three series of the programme is available to purchase on DVD in the UK, however, all three can be watched on demand by subscribers of National Geographic on Sky, Virgin Media and BT Vision. In Australia, all three series are available on DVD, either separately or as a box-set.

== Episode list ==
=== Series 1 (2008) ===
No. in season	Title	Directed by	Original release date	BBC airdate
1	"Airbus A380"	Kenny Scott	8 September 2008	1 March 2010
2	"Taipei Tower"	Mike Slee	15 September 2008	8 March 2010
3	"Deep Space Observatory"	Nick Metcalfe	22 September 2008	15 March 2010
4	"Super Rig"	Nick Metcalfe	29 September 2008	22 March 2010

=== Series 2 (2009) ===
No. in season	Title	Original release date	BBC airdate
1	"Wembley Stadium"	7 September 2009	8 May 2010
2	"Sydney Opera House"	14 September 2009	15 May 2010
3	"HMS Illustrious"	21 September 2009	22 May 2010
4	"Guggenheim Bilbao"	28 September 2009	29 May 2010
5	"Millau Sky Bridge"	5 October 2009	5 June 2010
6	"Hong Kong International Airport"	11 October 2009	12 June 2010

=== Series 3 (2011) ===
No. in season	Title	NGC AU & NZ Airdate	BBC2 airdate
1	"Burj Al Arab"	25 January 2011	8 May 2011
2	"Formula 1"	TBA	15 May 2011
3	"Super Tankers"	4 January 2011	22 May 2011
4	"The Earthquake-Proof Bridge"	TBA	29 May 2011
5	"Space Shuttle"	TBA	5 June 2011
6	"Bullet Train"	3 February 2011	12 June 2011

== BBC2 episodes ratings ==
=== Series 1 ===
No.	Episode	UK air date	Viewers (millions)	Audience share in timeslot
1	"Airbus A380"	15 February 2009	2.89	10.7%
2	"Taipei 101"	22 February 2009	2.63	9.6%
3	"Deep Space Observer"	1 March 2009	2.15	8.1%
4	"Super Rig"	8 March 2009	2.66	9.7%

== See also ==
- Mega Builders
- Extreme Engineering
- Megastructures (TV series)
- Ultimate Factories
