= Superstructure (disambiguation) =

A superstructure is an upward extension of an existing structure above a baseline, in civil and naval engineering.

Superstructure may also refer to:

- Superstructure (condensed matter): some additional structure superimposed on a more basic structure, e.g. magnetic ordering in a crystal or helical ordering in a protein.
- A universe (mathematics) obtained from a set by taking the power set countably many times.
- A structure (mathematical logic) of which another structure is a substructure.
- A key concept in Marxist philosophy, see base and superstructure.

== See also ==
- Megastructure (disambiguation)
- MegaStructures is a documentary television series
