= Danny Forster =

American architect and TV host (born 1977)

Daniel Keith Forster (born September 19, 1977) is an American designer, television host, film and television producer, director, professor, and speaker. He is best known as the host of the Science Channel series Build It Bigger; as the creator and executive producer of the Emmy-winning Rising: Rebuilding Ground Zero; and as the principal of DFDS, a New York-based design firm.

== Early life and education ==
Born in Brooklyn, New York, Forster grew up in Tenafly, New Jersey, the son of George, a neurologist, and Alice, a pediatric AIDS and hemophilia clinician. He attended The Elisabeth Morrow School and went on to graduate from the Dwight-Englewood School in 1995. After, he attended Wesleyan University, graduating with honors in 1999 with a BA in Art and Architectural History. After college, Forster worked as a real estate agent in New York City for several years. He was also the founder of UrbanFilter, which was later acquired by Citi Habitats. He then moved to Cambridge, Massachusetts, to matriculate at Harvard University's Graduate School of Design. He earned his Master's in Architecture in 2006. His master's thesis proposed a vertical urban campus containing both apartments and office space in a post-college collaborative living and working environment.

== Television host ==
Forster's television career began in the midst of his studies at Harvard GSD, when he was hired to host a Discovery Channel series, Extreme Engineering, which was in its third season as a voiceover narrated documentary series about outsized construction projects underway around the world. The new episodes were a success for the Discovery Channel, which subsequently gave Forster his own show, Build It Bigger.

Build It Bigger ran for five seasons, during which it became the highest rated show on the Science Channel (where it moved after its first season), and won a 2010 Directors Guild of America Award. The show took Forster and a camera crew around the world to investigate pioneering architectural and engineering projects, and put them in cultural, historical, and environmental context. Build It Bigger brought Forster to more than fifty countries.

== Television producer ==
In 2007, Forster became an executive producer as well as the host of Build It Bigger. He also took on another project for Discovery, as the host and executive producer of a four-part series, Build It Bigger: Rebuilding Greensburg. Airing in 2008 on Planet Green, a network dedicated to sustainable living, Rebuilding Greensburg documented the struggle of a small town in Kansas not just to rebuild after a devastating tornado, but also to reinvent itself as the first LEED platinum-certified eco-town in America.

Forster's next major producing project was the Emmy Award-winning documentary miniseries Rising: Rebuilding Ground Zero, which he created and co-executive produced with Steven Spielberg. Rising aired on the Discovery Channel and the Science Channel on September 11, 2011, ten years after the attack on the World Trade Center. In six one-hour episodes, filmed over a three-year period, the series chronicles the vast effort to rebuild and reimagine lower Manhattan in the wake of 9/11. Rising was one of five nominees for the 2012 Emmy Award for Outstanding Historical Programming—Long Form, and won an Emmy Award for Outstanding Individual Achievement in a Craft: Graphic Design and Art Direction (Dbox), as well as won for Promotional Announcement.

In 2014, Forster was the executive producer and on-screen host of a three-part documentary series for Discovery International called How China Works.

The show focused on urbanization, innovation, and the growth of the middle class. The show examined, among other topics, the expansion of high-speed rail, China's fiscal policy in the face of the 2008 financial crisis, changes in the diet of the middle class, and the government's ambitious space program. How China Works received seven million hits in its first six hours of being available online.

== Film producer and director ==
Beginning in 2013, Forster directed and produced a feature-length documentary on the South Korean photographer and businessman known as Ahae. The film detailed Ahae's four-year project of photographing the scene from one window of a room in an isolated compound forty miles south of Seoul, as well as the art world's reception of the project (there were exhibits at the Prague National Gallery, the Louvre, Versailles, Grand Central Terminal, among others) and possible explanations of its origin.

The project was shelved when, in the spring of 2014, after an investigation into the disastrous sinking of the ferry Sewol, prosecutors issued an arrest warrant for Ahae, the ferry's de facto owner. Ahae subsequently went into hiding; in July, South Korean police reported that he had been found dead.

Forster has also written and directed several real-estate marketing films for clients such as the Macklowe Properties and the Howard Hughes Corporation. His film for Macklowe, to promote the multibillion-dollar skyscraper 432 Park Avenue, received notice in the New York Times for its inventiveness and scope.

Made in 2013, in conjunction with marketing agency DBOX, this 4-minute, $1 million movie is the most expensive and complex real estate marketing film ever made. Rather than touting statistics and amenities, the movie evokes the building's place in a larger art historical and cultural lineage that encompasses architecture, film, dance, sculpture, painting, music, and even—through the appearance of tightrope walker Philippe Petit—performance art.

Forster directed a slightly more traditional marketing film for 510 W. 22nd Street, while continuing to focus more on story, context, and atmosphere than on specs. For the Howard Hughes Corporation, his filmic vision of the future Gateway Towers by Richard Meier helped shift the perception of Honolulu, Hawaii, from a mid-brow tourist haven to an epicenter of high-end architecture and culture.

== Architectural designer ==
In 2007, Forster founded the eponymous architecture design firm Danny Forster Design Studio (DFDS). The firm's inaugural project was the first LEED Gold certified home in Northern Michigan, which was completed in 2008. The home, a lake house in Omena, Michigan, has since been featured in Architectural Review, Architectural Record, and Traverse Magazine.

DFDS, headquartered in Manhattan, has a small portfolio of New York City-based projects including brand hotels and apartment/condo renovations of various sizes. One of the past projects in New York includes a penthouse renovation for Lord of the Rings director Peter Jackson. A current project in New York City is the apartment renovation for pop star Taylor Swift. Past theoretical and non-realized projects include a 280,000 square-foot mixed-use tower for the American Bible Society. In 2012, DFDS worked on a 30-story Courtyard by Marriott on the World Trade Center's Southeastern edge, which has been called "a standout even among the starchitecture of Ground Zero" and "will boast a faceted façade that makes the 317-room hotel look like it floats above the National September 11 Memorial."

DFDS then worked on the design for one of the first North American AC Hotels by Marriott: at 220-room AC Hudson Yards, located in the center of the transformative redevelopment of Manhattan's Far West Side.

== Lecturer of architecture ==
In 2009, Forster began his academic career, returning to the Harvard University Graduate School of Design as a lecturer. He taught an upper level graduate architecture studio about sustainable design entitled "Puntacana: The Modern, the Vernacular, The Sustainable," which investigated the ways in which an eco-resort in the Dominican Republic could organize and develop sustainable housing based on a deep understanding of local vernacular building styles, materials, and culture. The student work was published in the January 2010 Archivos de Arquitectura Antillana. Forster taught a similar course in 2010 at the Syracuse University School of Architecture, where he held the Rubin Global Studio visiting professorship. His emphasis as a professor was on truly site-specific design for real clients. Also for Syracuse, he taught a travel studio at the World Trade Center in New York City (2011), where students sought to create a new home for the Tribute Center on the campus of the WTC. And at Baku, Azerbaijan (2012), Forster's Syracuse students were asked to design a new arts and culture building as part of the expansion of a new International School in Baku.

== Speaker ==
Since 2006, Forster has lectured nationally and internationally on architecture, education and sustainability to audiences as large as 10,000 and as small as a fifth grade class in Northern New Jersey. Forster was the keynote speaker at the AVEVA International Symposium for Engineering Information Technology (ISEIT) in 2006, delivered executive seminars at The Studley Commercial Real Estate Going Green Conference, and hosted the American Council of Engineering Companies' awards gala in 2007. In that year he also became a spokesperson for Discovery Education, acting as their engineering and architecture expert and promoting STEM education at events around the country and the world.

He was the keynote speaker at the 2008 Solid Works World Expo, the largest 3-D conference in the world. He also keynoted Construct 2008, an architecture/engineering conference, and spoke at the Copenmind conference in Copenhagen, and delivered the 2008 commencement address for the Dwight-Englewood School in New Jersey. In 2011 and 2012, Forster hosted the Edison Awards, which honors "top innovators around the world."

In 2013, Forster spoke at the Global Minds conference in Yekaterinburg, Russia, on behalf of Russian bid to host the EXPO 2020. In 2014, Forster delivered a TED talk in Traverse City, Michigan, "Looking vs. Reading: Filmmaking Architecture” and spoke at the 34th annual Future of Education Technology Conference. He was host as well as speaker for Chicago Ideas Week in 2013 ("Creative Process: A Method to the Madness”) and 2014 ("Creative Process: The Impulsive, Calculated, Evolving, Joyful, Maddening Journey from Idea to Reality”).
