= Elisabeth Morrow School =

Private school in New Jersey, United States

The Elisabeth Morrow School

Location
- 435 Lydecker Street; Englewood, NJ 07631; 40.903397°N 73.959939°W

Information
- Type: Coeducational Private school
- Established: 1930
- NCES School ID: 00869069
- Headmaster: Marek Beck
- Faculty: NA FTEs
- Grades: Age Two through Grade Eight
- Enrollment: more than 400
- Student to teacher ratio: NA
- Colors: Green, White
- Website: www.elisabethmorrow.org

The Elisabeth Morrow School is a private, co-educational, day school in the United States in Englewood, New Jersey, educating children from nursery through eighth grade.

As of the 2026–27 school year, the school has an enrollment of 425 students.

The Elisabeth Morrow School is a member of the New Jersey Association of Independent Schools. Other memberships include the National Association of Independent Schools, the Independent School Admissions Association of Greater New York, the Council for Advancement and Support of Education, The Association for Supervision and Curriculum Development, Parents League of New York, Early Steps, the Educational Records Bureau, and the Association of Independent School Admission Professionals.

== History ==
The school was founded in 1930 by Elisabeth Morrow, daughter of Elizabeth Cutter Morrow, and Constance Chilton, with an initial enrollment of forty students. Since the mid-1950s, the school has expanded, enlarging its campus on the grounds of the Morrow Family estate.

In 2004-05, a new middle school was added, so that students can complete their education through the eighth grade.

In 2019-20, the school announced the expansion of its innovative Early Childhood Education Program to include children starting at age 2. There are no other academic programs for two-year-old children offered by independent schools within a commutable distance of Englewood, New Jersey.

== Campus ==
The school's 14-acre (57,000 m^{2}) campus encompasses three classroom buildings, two gymnasiums/performing arts center, three playgrounds, playing field, and a running brook. Facilities include three state-of-the-art science labs, technology labs, multiple libraries, two music and two art studios as well as a middle school social space and ceramics studio.

Morrow House, the former Georgian home of the Morrow family, is now used for fifth through eighth graders. The Little School, built in 1939, is home to first through fourth graders, while nursery and kindergarteners are in Chilton House, designed in 1970. Fourth grade was not connected to the Little School until 2005, when the admission rooms were moved.

== Awards and Honors ==
The Elisabeth Morrow School was selected as a 2025 National Blue Ribbon School, recognized for exemplary academic performance by the Council for American Private Education (CAPE) and the New Jersey State Board of Education. In 2026, the institution was named a National Gold Star School by the National Association of Elementary School Principals (NAESP).

The school is designated as an Apple Distinguished School for its leadership in educational innovation, and holds a Responsible AI in Learning (RAIL) Endorsement in AI Literacy, Safety, and Ethics. Additionally, as a UN Global School, the institution integrates the United Nations Sustainable Development Goals (SDGs) into its curriculum. The school was also a consecutive recipient of the ASCA Student Council School of Excellence Award in 2025 and 2026, a national honor recognizing excellence in student leadership.

== Notable alumni ==
- Robert A. Agresta (born 1983), council-president, Englewood Cliffs, NJ; attorney-at-law, venture capitalist
- Hope Davis (born 1964), actress
- Anna Dewdney (1965-2016), author and illustrator of children's books, including Llama Llama Red Pajama
- Patrick Ewing Jr. (born 1984), professional basketball player
- Danny Forster (born 1977, class of 1989), producer, television host and architect
- Karen O, lead singer for the Yeah Yeah Yeahs
- Larry Kudlow (born 1947), news analyst, economist, columnist, journalist, political commentator and radio personality
- Eric Maskin (born 1950), economist; Nobel laureate
- Lara Setrakian, reporter
- Mira Sorvino (born 1967), actress
