= Dwight-Englewood School =

Private school in Englewood, New Jersey, US

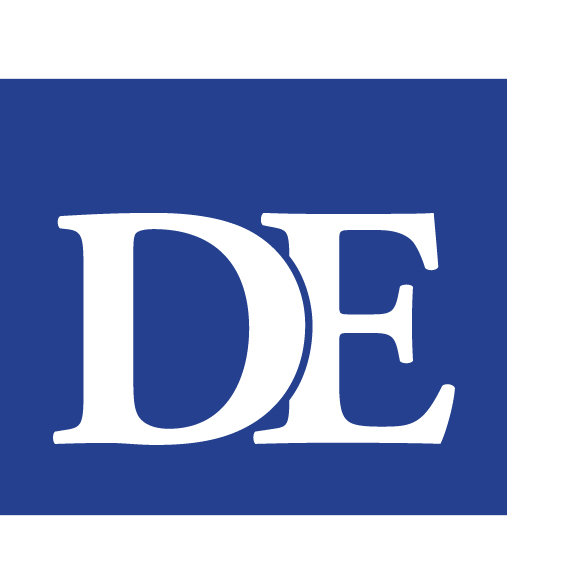

Location
- 315 East Palisade Avenue; Englewood, Bergen County, New Jersey 07631; United States; 40.887641°N 73.963486°W

Information
- Type: Independent Day
- Motto: Per ardua ad veritatem (through hard work, we arrive at the truth)
- Established: 1889/1928/1973
- NCES School ID: 00869003
- Principal: Kimberly Lalli (Upper); Jonathan Davis (Middle); Susan Abramson / Julia Calantone (lower)
- Head of school: James Calleroz White
- Faculty: 125.9 FTEs
- Grades: PreK-12
- Enrollment: 1,040 (plus 28 in PreK, as of 2019–20)
- Student to teacher ratio: 8.3:1
- Campus: Suburban, on 45 acres (18 ha)
- Colors: Blue; Gold; White
- Athletics conference: North Jersey Interscholastic Conference
- Team name: Bulldogs
- Publication: Calliope, Parnassus
- Newspaper: Spectrum, The Flea
- Yearbook: Carpe Diem
- Tuition: $59,235 (grades 6–12 for 2024–25)
- Website: www.d-e.org

The Dwight-Englewood School (D-E) is an independent coeducational college-preparatory day school, located in Englewood in Bergen County, in the U.S. state of New Jersey. The school teaches students from pre-kindergarten through twelfth grade in three functionally separate schools. The Lower School, formerly known as the Bede School, serves students in pre-kindergarten through 5th grade in Drapkin Hall. The Middle School, which used to be in Umpleby Hall, is now in the new middle school building which was finished in 2019, serves students in 6th through 8th grade. The Upper School serves grades 9 through 12, and it houses its administration in the Leggett building and the Campus Center. Other buildings are the Hajjar STEM Center, Swartley Arts Center, the Imperatore Library and the Modell Sports Complex.

As of the 2019–20 school year, the school had an enrollment of 1,040 students (plus 28 in PreK) and 125.9 classroom teachers (on an FTE basis), for a student–teacher ratio of 8.3:1. The school's student body was 49.4% (514) White, 24.4% (254) Asian, 11.5% (120) Black, 9.0% (94) American Indian/ Alaska Native, 5.1% (53) Hispanic and 0.5% (5) Native Hawaiian/ Pacific Islander.

Dwight-Englewood is a member of the New Jersey Association of Independent Schools and has been accredited by the Middle States Association of Colleges and Schools Commission on Elementary and Secondary Schools since 1999.

== Awards, recognition and rankings ==
Dwight-Englewood was awarded the Blue Ribbon School Award of Excellence by the United States Department of Education, the highest award an American school can receive, during the 1986-87 school year.

== History ==
In 1889, the Dwight School for Girls was founded as a college preparatory school by Euphemia S. Creighton and Ellen W. Farrar. The name is chosen to honor then-president of Yale University, the Rev. Timothy Dwight V, whose educational philosophy they admired. The Englewood School for Boys was established in 1928 as a college preparatory school. In 1973, the two schools formed a nonprofit corporation known as Dwight-Englewood School. In 1993, Dwight-Englewood School and The Bede School merged to add students in Pre-K through sixth grade.

== Campus ==
The school's campus consists of 15 buildings totaling 318,000 square feet (29,500 m^{2}). The campus covers 45 acres (18 ha). The principal educational facilities are:

Leggett Hall - 21 Upper-School Classrooms - Middle School Drama & Latin Classes - Headmaster's Office - Upper School Principal and Deans Offices - Hulst House - Wireless Internet Access

Campus Center - Hajjar Auditorium - Shenck Auditiorium - 9 General Classrooms - Student Coop and Bookstore - Cafeteria - Student Lounges - Bells Classroom - Choir Room - Arts Display Spaces - Wireless Internet Access

Hajjar STEM Center - Wireless Internet Access- 8 Science Labs with Fume Hoods, Chemical Working Surfaces, etc. - 7 classrooms - Math and Science Department Offices- Massoud Steps Meeting Area- Robotics Lab

Imperatore Library - 35,000+ Volumes - Computer Workspaces - Student Lounge - 4 Language Classrooms - Taub Technology Center - Wireless Internet Access

Swartley Art Center - Photography Studio - Ceramics - Art History - 2 Studio Arts Classrooms - Music Practice - Art Gallery - Printmaking Facilities - Wireless Internet Access

Khubani Performing Arts Center - Theatre - Music Instruction Rooms - 1 Sound and Lighting Booth - 1 Projection Booth

Modell's Sports Complex 2 Gymnasiums - Dance/Aerobic Studio - Weight Room - 2 On-Campus Fields - 2 Additional Fields - 5 Tennis Courts

Lower School Building 15 Classrooms - Cafeteria - Gymnasium - Library - Computer Room - Wireless Internet Access

Umpleby Hall - 28 Middle-School Classrooms - 2 Science Labs - Wireless Internet Access

Graham House - Admissions Office - Alumni Office - Business Office - Development Office

Middle School Building A 10,910 square feet (1,014 m^{2}) Middle School facility was built, replacing the Library Circle area of the campus and the now-demolished Generoso Pope Science Hall.

There are also plans for a 14,284 square feet (1,327.0 m^{2}) multi-story auditorium to be built on campus to replace what is currently Umpleby Hall.

== Organization ==
Internally, the school has Principals for the lower, middle, and upper schools, as well as deans of students. The overall executive position which oversees all three schools is that of the Head of School. Within the schools, there are departments for Math, English, History, Science, Language, Physical Education, Technology, Human Development, and Arts. Each department has a department chair. Additionally, each grade in the middle and upper schools has a class dean who helps the students in their grade and manages certain grade-specific activities. Some class deans also teach various subjects at school aside from their role as class dean.

== Athletics ==
The Dwight-Englewood Bulldogs participate in the North Jersey Interscholastic Conference, which comprises small-enrollment schools in Bergen, Hudson County, Morris County and Passaic County counties, and was created following a reorganization of sports leagues in Northern New Jersey by the New Jersey State Interscholastic Athletic Association (NJSIAA). Prior to the realignment that took effect in the fall of 2010, Dwight-Englewood was a member of the Bergen County Scholastic League. With 388 students in grades 10-12, the school was classified by the NJSIAA for the 2019–20 school year as Non-Public A for most athletic competition purposes, which included schools with an enrollment of 381 to 1,454 students in that grade range (equivalent to Group I for public schools). The school was classified by the NJSIAA as Non-Public Group III for football for 2018–2020. The school has many athletics programs, including boys' lacrosse, girls' lacrosse, boys' baseball, girls' softball, boys' football, coed golf, girls' field hockey, boys' basketball, girls' basketball, girls' volleyball, boys' tennis, girls' tennis, coed spring and winter track, coed cross country and coed ultimate frisbee.

The boys tennis team won the Non-Public B state championship in 1991 (defeating Moorestown Friends School in the final match of the tournament), 2008 (vs. Sacred Heart High School), 2010 (vs. Moorestown Friends), and won the Non-Public A state title in 2000 (vs. Christian Brothers Academy), 2002 (vs. St. Augustine Preparatory School). The boys' tennis team won the 2002 Non-Public B state championship and was the runner-up to Holmdel High School in the Tournament of Champions, falling by the score of 3-2 in the finals. In spring 2008, the boys' tennis team finished with a record of 21-1 and won the Bergen County Groups 1-2, North Jersey Group B Sectional, and Non-Public B state championship with a 5-0 win over Sacred Heart. The team's only loss was in the Tournament of Champions semi-finals to ultimate runner-up Westfield High School by the score of 3-2. In 2010 the boys' team won the North Jersey Group B sectional, knocking off tournament favorite Newark Academy 3-2, and won the Group B title once again, against Moorestown Friends 4-1, before falling in the Tournament of Champions semifinal to Westfield, 3 1/2-1 1/2, t finish the season with a record of 26-4.

The ice hockey team won the McInnis Cup in 1994.

The wrestling team won the Non-Public Group B state championship in 1999.

The girls tennis team won the Non-Public A state championship in 2001 (vs. Red Bank Catholic High School). The girls' varsity tennis team won the Bergen County Small Schools title in 2010, finishing the season with a record of 18-1 and earning Courtney Baiardi Stasi recognition by The Star-Ledger as its Coach of the Year for the season.

== Robotics teams ==
The Dwight-Englewood Upper School robotics teams compete in FIRST Tech Challenge (FTC), an international robotics competition for students in grades 7-12. The Dwight-Englewood varsity robotics team, Critical Mass (FTC 207), was founded in 2005. D-E's Junior Varsity and Freshman teams (FTC 13048 Absolute Zero and FTC 13663 Quantum Smashers, respectively) were founded in 2017.

The Varsity team has competed at state, regional, and international levels. In the 2014-2015 FTC season, Critical Mass competed at the East Super-Regional Championship Tournament, and in the 2016–17 season, the team won the Vermont FTC Championship and placed 13th in the Edison division at the FIRST Tech Challenge World Championship. In 2017–18 season, the team won the New Jersey FTC Championship and went on to place 18th in the Edison division at the world championship.

== The Fifth-Grade opera ==
In fifth grade, students compose and write an original opera. They form an opera company and go through all the steps necessary to stage a full production—script writing, libretto, costumes and makeup, set design, lighting, and publicity. This project is part of the Metropolitan Opera's program, "Creating Original Opera." 2022 will be the 33rd year of opera production at the Lower School, as the 2020 Opera was unable to be completed due to the COVID-19 pandemic.

== Student government ==
The Dwight-Englewood Student Government is divided into many initiatives. There are three groups of initiatives, which include a Curriculum, Facilities, and Life/Spirit Group. Within each group, there are multiple initiatives. Each initiative focuses on a certain issue such as workload or the Coop. There is also a President and a Vice-President, along with a Head for each Group and Initiative. There is also the position of Class Coordinator within each grade.

Before, the Student Government was divided into four Committees, Life, Spirit, Facilities, and Curriculum. The Student Life committee focused on things such as social events, and student privileges. The Spirit Committee concurrently worked with the life committee on social events, and they also hosted Spirit Week, Coffeehouse, and the MAGIC field day. The Facilities Committee addressed needs that include mending infrastructure around campus, and Maintenance Appreciation Day.

== Controversies ==
=== 2021 allegations ===
In May 2021, the Foundation Against Intolerance and Racism (FAIR) sent a letter to the school criticizing their lessons on gender identity and race. FAIR said that lessons at the school taught students that teach young children that people are in danger because of whiteness, that racism is exclusively associated with whiteness, and say without qualification that white people have more opportunities than "non-white" people. FAIR also criticized lessons on gender identity and pronouns, claiming that they were age-inappropriate and that asking students to share their pronouns or use other schoolmate's pronouns may violate their religious rights.

In June, FAIR started a campaign to support Dana Stangel-Plowe, who resigned from the Dwight-Englewood School due to what she called "essentialist, racialist thinking". In her resignation letter, which was published by FAIR, she stated "this year, administrators continue to assert D-E's policy that we are hiring 'for diversity,' D-E has become a workplace that is hostile toward educators based solely on their immutable traits."

=== Head of School's 2022 resignation ===
On May 2, 2022, a little over a month before the end of the school year, the Dwight-Englewood community was informed that Head of School Dr. Rodney De Jarnett had resigned "effectively immediately." In an email to parents and students, Board President Robert E. Miller stated, "Dr. De Jarnett's resignation follows conduct inconsistent with Dwight-Englewood School's values and standards of behavior."

== Popular culture references ==
- In 2005, chef/author Anthony Bourdain returned to Dwight-Englewood to film a segment for his TV show, "Anthony Bourdain: No Reservations".
- In 1998 film Rounders, the character played by Matt Damon mentions the school.

== Notable alumni ==
School alumni include many honored with the Distinguished Alumni Award:

- Robert A. Agresta (born 1983, class of 2001), corporate lawyer and investor
- Liam Aiken (born 1990; class of 2008), actor
- Bob Bakish (born 1963, class of 1981), Former CEO of Paramount Global
- Peter Balakian (born 1951; class of 1969), poet and writer
- Anthony Bourdain (1956–2018; class of 1973), chef, author, TV host
- Dick Button (born 1929; class of 1947), figure skater
- Claudia Cohen (1950–2007), gossip columnist, socialite, and television reporter
- Tyson Etienne (born 1999), professional basketball player for the College Park Skyhawks
- Lucy Fisher (born 1949, class of 1967), film producer
- Danny Forster (born 1977, class of 1995), designer and host of the Science Channel series Build It Bigger
- J. Christopher Giancarlo (born 1959, class of 1977), U.S. Commodity Futures Trading Commission chairman
- Lesley Gore (1946–2015, class of 1964), singer
- Michael Gore (born 1951, class of 1969), songwriter
- Allison Hirschlag (born 1984), television actress, Guiding Light
- Jason Itzler (born 1967 as Jason Sylk), founder of NY Confidential, an escort agency
- Dave Jeser (born 1977, class of 1995), co-creator, Drawn Together
- Michael Kazin (born 1948, class of 1966), historian, Georgetown University professor, and co-editor of Dissent magazine
- Larry Kudlow (born 1947, class of 1965), former Ronald Reagan Office of Management and Budget economic advisor, economic advisor to Donald Trump, and CNBC host
- Michael Leiter (class of 1987), former National Counterterrorism Center director
- Anne Morrow Lindbergh (1906–2001, class of 1924), author and former wife of Charles Lindbergh
- James Lord (1922–2009, class of 1940), author
- Paul Lucas (1961–2020, class of 1979), playwright
- Bruce C. McKenna (born 1962, class of 1980), television and movie screenwriter
- Elfrida von Nardroff (1925–2021), game show contestant who in 1958 won $220,500 (equivalent to $2.5 million in 2025) on the fixed game show Twenty-One, more money than any other contestant on the show
- Karen O (born 1978, class of 1996), vocalist for pop rock band Yeah Yeah Yeahs
- Daphne Oz (born 1986, class of 2004), daughter of Mehmet Oz, author, public speaker and co-host of the television show The Chew
- Tim Peper (born 1980, class of 1998), actor
- Florence Rice (1907–1974, class of 1925), film actress
- Anna Rochester (1880–1966, class of 1897), labor reformer, journalist, political activist, and Communist
- Lucinda Rosenfeld (born 1969), novelist
- Sophia Rosenfeld (born 1966, class of 1984), historian
- Brooke Shields (born 1965, class of 1983), model and actress
- George Shultz (1920–2021, class of 1938), former U.S. Secretary of State
- Matt Silverstein (born 1979, class of 1990), co-creator of Drawn Together
- Mira Sorvino (born 1967), actor
- Margaret Bailey Speer (1900–1997, class of 1917), educator and college dean in China
- Robert Whitman (1935–2024), visual and performance artist best known for his pieces of the early 1960s combining visual and sound images, actors, film, slides, and evocative props
- Cyma Zarghami (born 1962, class of 1980), president of Nickelodeon and MTV Networks' Kids & Family Group

== Notable faculty ==
- Peter Balakian (born 1951), poet and author
- Bruce Smith (born 1946), poet

== See also ==
- List of high schools in New Jersey
