= Urban tourism =

Tourism within cities

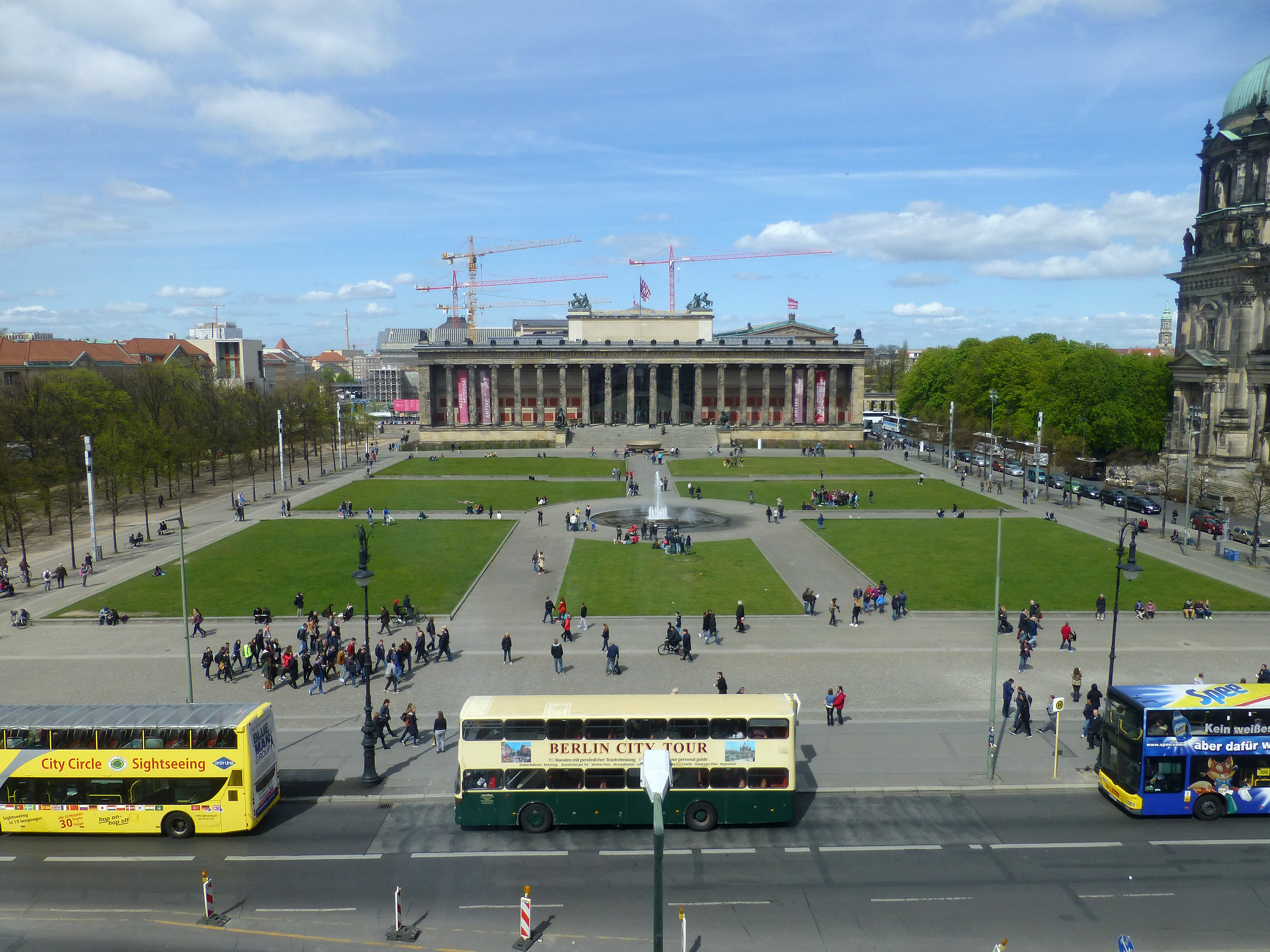
Row of tourist buses in front of the Berlin Cathedral and the Altes Museum, Berlin (Germany).

Urban tourism, or also called city tourism, is a form of tourism that takes place in the large human agglomerations, usually in the main cities or urban areas of each country.

== Definition ==
According to the World Tourism Organization (UNWTO), urban tourism is defined as "a type of tourism activity which takes place in an urban space with its inherent attributes characterized by non-agricultural based economy such as administration, manufacturing, trade and services and by being nodal points of transport. Urban/city destinations offer a broad and heterogeneous range of cultural, architectural, technological, social and natural experiences and products for leisure and business".

== Activities ==
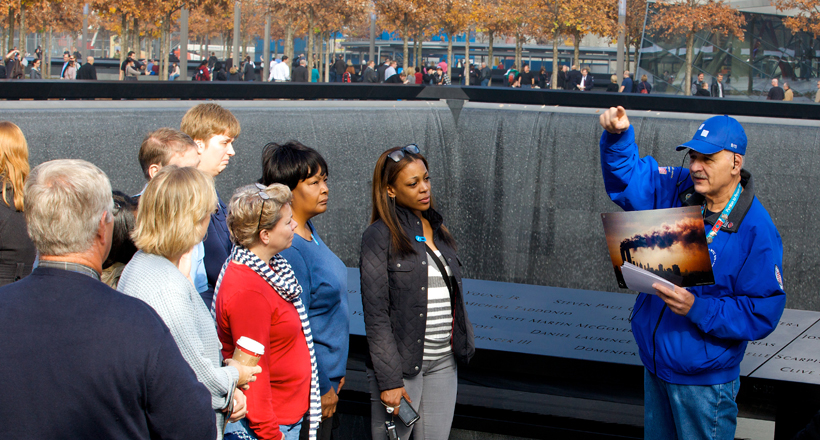
A guided tour around the 9/11 Tribute Museum in Manhattan, New York City.

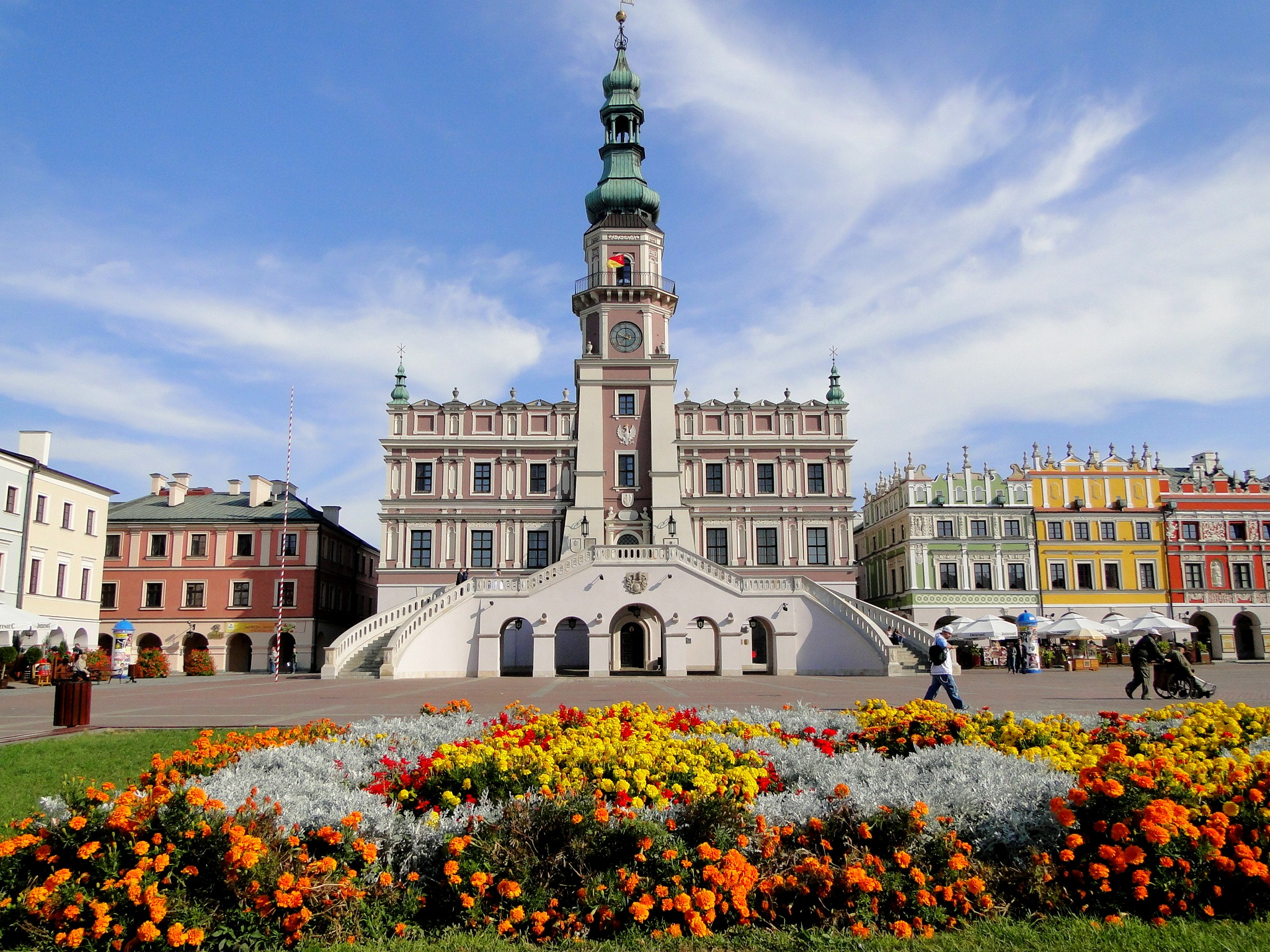
The Old City of Zamość (Poland), built as an ideal city, now a UNESCO World Heritage Site.

There are different activities carried out by city tourists, among them the visit to buildings within a city, such as museums and art galleries, religious temples, skyscrapers and buildings with some historical interest, monuments and memorials, cemeteries, etc. There is also another modality of city tourism associated with attendance at massive events, such as festivals, concerts, parades, conferences, demonstrations and protests, etc. Tourist activities linked to nightlife and cultural tourism are also typical of city tourism, due to the supply that exists in the most populated areas. In the same way, there is a correlation between city tourism and shopping tourism, especially for people from smaller towns or countryside, who take advantage of sightseeing while shopping.

=== City tours ===
Tour operators have a varied offer of tourism packages that include visits within a specific city, as well as several cities within a country or continent. In addition, expert tourist guides are available in cities with a large influx of tourists.
