= Paul Lucas (playwright) =

American playwright (1961–2020)

- Born: October 15, 1961; New York City, New York, U.S.
- Died: August 12, 2020 (Aged 58); Sparta Township, New Jersey, U.S.
- Spouse(s): Kendall Messick (Husband, m. 2020)

Paul Lucas was an American playwright and producer based in New York City. He was best known for his play, Trans Scripts, Part I: The Women, which won a Fringe First award at the Edinburgh Festival Fringe and a High Commendation from Amnesty International for Freedom of Expression, and was performed by the American Repertory Theater at Harvard University.

== Career ==
Lucas attended Dwight-Englewood School and graduated in 1979.

He performed and worked in several theatrical offices in New York City before joining Paul Szilard Productions, where he booked for the Alvin Ailey American Dance Theater. While still working with Szilard, he produced several plays off-Broadway, including Messages for Gar which featured John Epperson and Alex McCord; TimeSlips, written by Anne Basting; Nosferatu, which starred Nikolai Kinski; and Son of Drakula, written and performed by David Drake. After a fellowship in Arts Administration at the John F. Kennedy Center for the Performing Arts, Lucas became the Director of Press and Marketing for Williamstown Theatre Festival.

Lucas founded Paul Lucas Productions, a production, management, and touring organization that specializes in international work. His productions at the Edinburgh Festival Fringe have included What I Heard About Iraq, an anti-Iraq War play by Simon Levy adapted from a prose poem by Eliot Weinberger. The play received a Fringe First award at the festival and toured in the UK. In 2006, he and associate Gail Winar produced The Be(A)st of Taylor Mac, which starred Taylor Mac. It won a Herald Angel Award in Edinburgh, and played in various cities. He produced Woody Sez: The Life & Music of Woody Guthrie, which starred David M. Lutken first at the festival in 2007 and later on tour in Europe and the United States. He produced the Edinburgh Festival Fringe presentation of Dai (enough), a one-woman show written and performed by Iris Bahr, about characters in a Tel Aviv cafe moments before a suicide bomber enters. He has also worked with American comedian and drag performer Miss Coco Peru.

In 2012, Lucas turned his attention to creating his own work, beginning with the play Trans Scripts, Part I: The Women, with the assistance of dramaturge Morgan Jenness, produced at the Pleasance Theater during the Edinburgh Festival Fringe in 2015, directed by Linda Ames Key. It received a Fringe First award, a High Commendation from Amnesty International for Freedom of Expression, and nominations for the Best of Edinburgh Award, the Holden Street Theaters Award, and the Feminist Fest Award. In 2015, the American Repertory Theater sponsored a one-night reading of the script at Harvard University and produced the play in 2017, with support from grants by the National Endowment for the Arts.
