= Megastructure (disambiguation) =

A megastructure is a very large artificial object.

Megastructure may also refer to:

- Megastructure (planning concept), a concept where a city or large settlement can be housed in one building
- Megastructures (TV series), a television series covering feats of engineering
