= Lucinda Rosenfeld =

American novelist

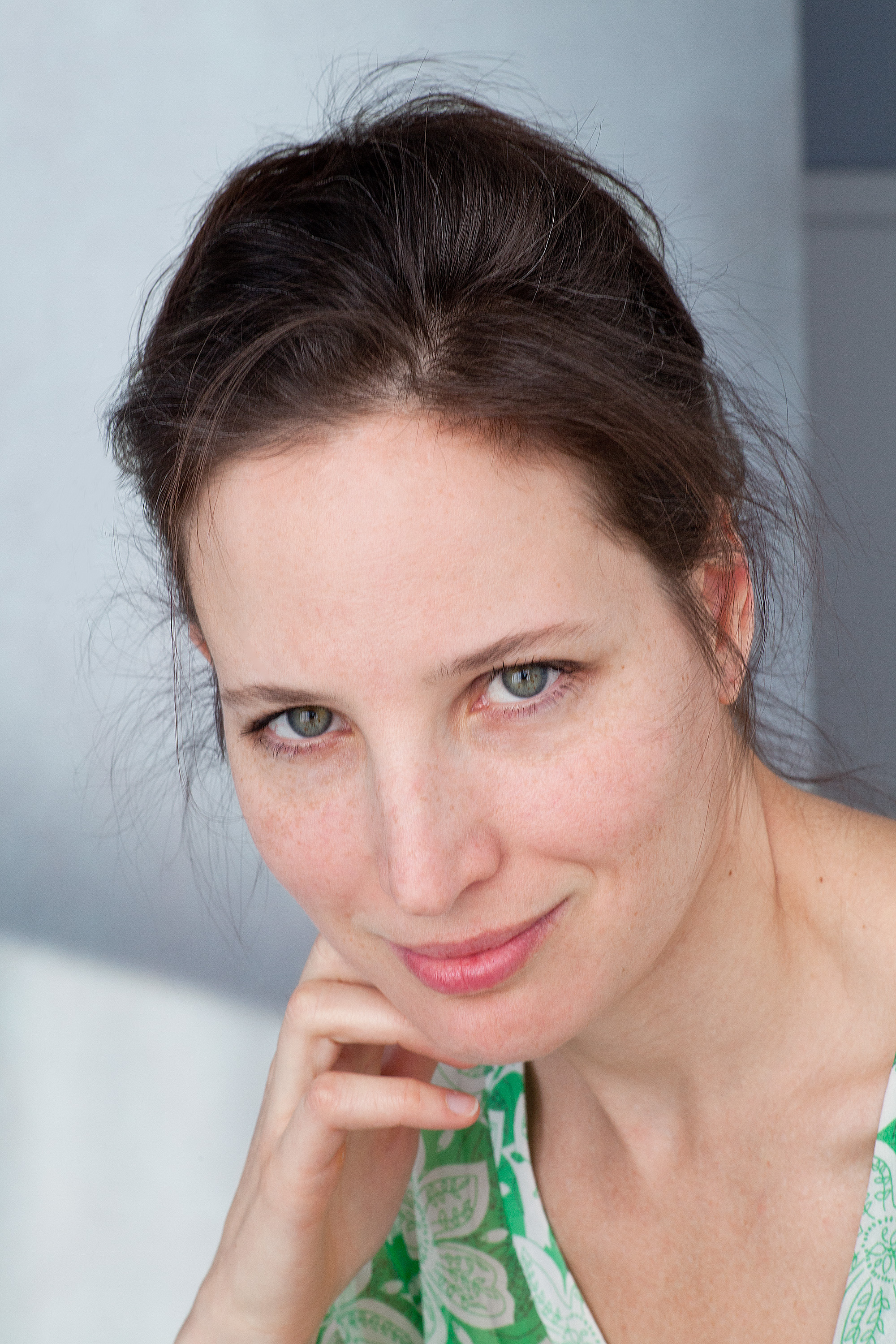
- Rosenfeld, in December 2011
- Born: December 31, 1969 (age 56); New York City, U.S.
- Education: Cornell University

Lucinda Rosenfeld (born December 31, 1969, in New York City) is an American novelist.

== Career ==
Her first novel, What She Saw in Roger Mancuso, Gunter Hopstock, Jason Barry Gold, Spitty Clark, Jack Geezo, Humphrey Fung, Claude Duvet, Bruce Bledstone, Kevin McFeeley, Arnold Allen, Pablo Miles, Anonymous 1-4, Nobody 5-8, Neil Schmertz, and Bo Pierce was published by Random House in hardcover in September 2000. The book follows the romantic travails of a girl named Phoebe Fine, beginning in elementary school and continuing into her mid-twenties. Each chapter revolves around (and is named after) a boy or man who played a role in Phoebe’s life. The book was excerpted in The New Yorker as a part of its Debut Fiction series (under the title, “The Male Gaze”)—and optioned by Miramax Films.

Rosenfeld published a sequel to What She Saw. . .--Why She Went Home (Random House)—in 2004. The novel centers around Phoebe’s return to her family’s suburban home at the age of thirty to care for her ailing mother and rethink her life’s goals.

Rosenfeld's third novel, I’m So Happy For You (Back Bay/Little Brown, 2009) is about competitive thirty-something best friends, Wendy Murman and Daphne Uberoff.

Her fourth novel, The Pretty One: A Novel about Sisters was published in February 2013 by Little, Brown and Company.

Her essays have appeared in: The New York Times Magazine, Creative Non-Fiction, New York magazine, Glamour, The New Yorker, and many other publications. Rosenfeld wrote the "Friend or Foe" advice column for Slate.com from 2009 to 2012.

== Personal ==
She grew up in Leonia, New Jersey, where she attended the Leonia Public Schools before going to the private Dwight-Englewood School for high school. At Cornell University, she majored in comparative literature.

Rosenfeld is married to economics writer John Cassidy of The New Yorker. They live in Brooklyn, New York and have two daughters.

In an essay in The New Yorker, On My Last Leg, she writes about her multiple sclerosis diagnosis.
