= Extreme Engineering =

American documentary series

- Also known as: Build It Bigger; Kings of Construction
- Genre: Documentary; Science/technology
- Directed by: Peter Frumkin; Olympia Stone
- Presented by: Danny Forster
- Country of origin: United States
- Original language: English
- No. of seasons: 9
- No. of episodes: 77 (list of episodes)

Production
- Running time: 42 minutes

Original release
- Network: HD Theater; Science Channel; Discovery Channel
- Release: April 13, 2003 – July 9, 2011

Related
- Engineering the Impossible (2002)

Extreme Engineering is a documentary television series that aired on the Discovery Channel and the Science Channel. The program featured future and ongoing engineering projects. Following season 3, the series was renamed Build It Bigger. The last season aired in July 2011. Danny Forster first hosted the series in season 4 and has been the host since season 6.

== Origins of the show ==
Engineering the Impossible was a 2-hour special, created and written by Alan Lindgren and produced by Powderhouse Productions for the Discovery Channel. It focused on three incredible, yet physically possible, engineering projects: the nine-mile-long (14 km) Gibraltar Bridge, the 170-story Millennium Tower and the over 4,000-foot-long (1,200 m) Freedom Ship. This program won the Beijing International Science Film Festival Silver Award, and earned Discovery's second-highest weeknight rating for 2002. After the success of this program, Discovery commissioned Powderhouse to produce the first season of the 10-part series, Extreme Engineering, whose episodes were written by Alan Lindgren, Ed Fields and several other Powderhouse writer-producers. Like Engineering the Impossible, the first season of Extreme Engineering focused on extreme projects of the future. Season 2 (and all seasons since) featured projects already in construction around the world.

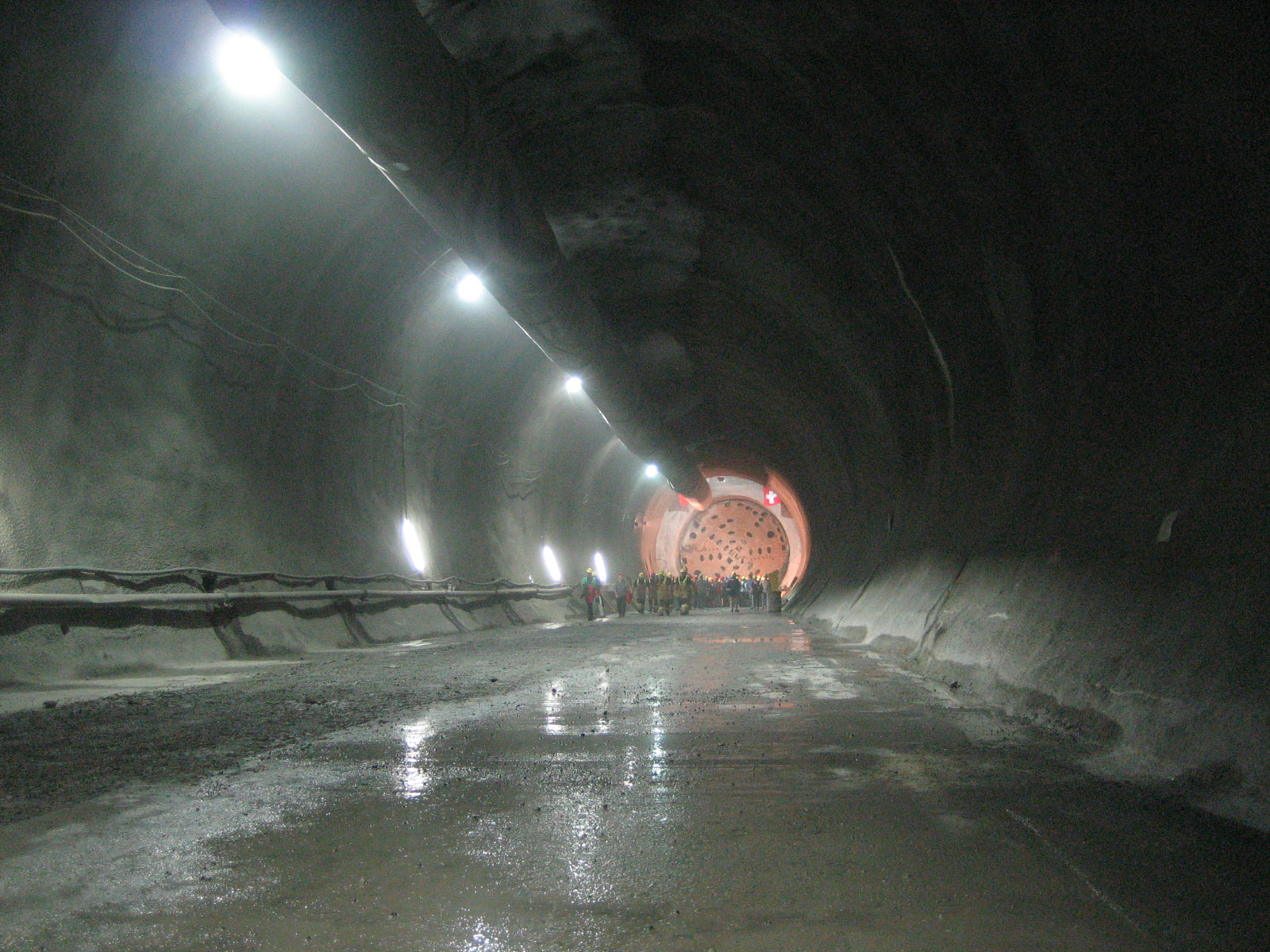
Gotthard Base Tunnel ( Season 1, Episode 6) – The TBM from Bodio arrived at MFS Faido in September 2006

== Episodes ==
=== Series overview ===
| Season | Episodes | Originally released | |
| Season | Episodes | First released | Last released |
|---|---|---|---|
| Pilot | 1 | TBA | TBA |
| 1 | 10 | April 13, 2003 | June 4, 2003 |
| 2 | 9 | July 7, 2004 | November 22, 2004 |
| 3 | 6 | October 19, 2005 | January 21, 2006 |
| 4 | 6 | February 19, 2006 | July 12, 2006 |
| 5 | 6 | October 11, 2006 | November 15, 2006 |
| 6 | 14 | July 10, 2007 | October 17, 2007 |
| 7 | 8 | April 20, 2009 | June 26, 2009 |
| 8 | 10 | April 8, 2010 | July 1, 2010 |
| 9 | 8 | April 8, 2011 | July 9, 2011 |

=== Pilot ===
| Title | Country | Project | Status at production | Original release date |
|---|---|---|---|---|
| "Engineering the Impossible" | Europe/Africa; United States; China | Gibraltar Bridge; Freedom Ship; Millennium Tower (originally planned for Tokyo, but shown in Hong Kong) | Proposed | TBA |
Activity since original air date: Millennium Tower on-hold/cancelled due to Central Reclamation Phase III lawsuit

=== Season 1: 2003 ===
| No. overall | No. in season | Title | Country | Project | Status at production | Original release date |
|---|---|---|---|---|---|---|
| 1 | 1 | "Tokyo's Sky City" | Japan | Tokyo's Sky City | Proposed | April 13, 2003 |
Activity since original air date: Proposed
| 2 | 2 | "Subways In America" | United States | East Side Access | Proposed | April 15, 2003 |
Activity since original air date: Completed in 2023
| 3 | 3 | "Transatlantic Tunnel" | United States; United Kingdom | The Transatlantic tunnel | Proposed | April 16, 2003 |
Activity since original air date: Proposed
| 4 | 4 | "City in a Pyramid" | Japan | The Shimizu Mega-City Pyramid over Tokyo Bay | Proposed | April 23, 2003 |
Activity since original air date: Proposed
| 5 | 5 | "Bridging the Bering Strait" | United States; Russia | The Bering Strait crossing | Proposed | April 30, 2003 |
Activity since original air date: Proposed
| 6 | 6 | "Tunneling Under the Alps" | Switzerland | Gotthard Base Tunnel | Under construction | May 7, 2003 |
Activity since original air date: Completed
| 7 | 7 | "Building Hong Kong's Airport" | Hong Kong | Hong Kong International Airport | Completed | May 14, 2003 |
Activity since original air date: Completed
| 8 | 8 | "Holland's Barriers to the Sea" | Netherlands | Maeslantkering and Oosterscheldekering storm surge barriers | Completed | May 21, 2003 |
Activity since original air date: Completed
| 9 | 9 | "Boston's Big Dig" | United States | Boston's Big Dig underground highway and bridge project | Under construction | May 28, 2003 |
Activity since original air date: Completed
| 10 | 10 | "Widening the Panama Canal" | Panama | Panama Canal expansion project | Completed | June 4, 2003 |
Activity since original air date: Completed

=== Season 2: 2004 ===
Season 2 was the first season produced in HDTV for HD Theater.

| No. overall | No. in season | Title | Country | Project | Status at production | Original release date |
|---|---|---|---|---|---|---|
| 11 | 1 | "Turning Torso" | Sweden | Turning Torso skyscraper | Completed | July 7, 2004 |
Activity since original air date: Completed
| 12 | 2 | "Venice Flood Gates" | Italy | Venice Tide Barrier Project (MOSE Project) | Under construction | July 14, 2004 |
Activity since original air date: Under construction (estimated completion 2022)
| 13 | 3 | "Container Ships" | Norway | Adrian Mærsk (Maersk Line) | Completed | July 28, 2004 |
Activity since original air date: Completed
| 14 | 4 | "Oakland Bay Bridge" | United States | Eastern span replacement of the San Francisco – Oakland Bay Bridge | Under construction | August 4, 2004 |
Activity since original air date: Completed
| 15 | 5 | "Iceland Tunnels" | Iceland | Kárahnjúkar Hydropower Plant | Under construction | September 1, 2004 |
Activity since original air date: Completed
| 16 | 6 | "Off-shore Oil Platforms" | N/A | Tarzan Class oil rigs | Under construction | September 25, 2004 |
Activity since original air date: Completed
| 17 | 7 | "Cooper River Bridge" | United States | Cooper River Bridge in Charleston, South Carolina | Under construction | October 5, 2004 |
Activity since original air date: Completed
| 18 | 8 | "Millau Viaduct" | France | Millau Viaduct in Southern France | Completed | November 15, 2004 |
Activity since original air date: Completed
| 19 | 9 | "Excavators" | United States | Hull–Rust–Mahoning Open Pit Iron Mine in Hibbing, Minnesota | Completed | November 22, 2004 |
Activity since original air date: Completed

=== Season 3: 2005–06 ===
| No. overall | No. in season | Title | Country | Project | Status at production | Original release date |
|---|---|---|---|---|---|---|
| 20 | 1 | "The Snøhvit Arctic Gas Processing Platform" | Norway | Snøhvit platform / MV Blue Marlin in the Norwegian Sea | Completed | October 19, 2005 |
Activity since original air date: Completed
| 21 | 2 | "The El Cajon Dam" | Mexico | El Cajon Dam in Mexico | Completed | November 10, 2005 |
Activity since original air date: Completed
| 22 | 3 | "Hong Kong's Cable Car" | Hong Kong | Ngong Ping 360 | Completed | December 2, 2005 (?) |
Activity since original air date: Completed
| 23 | 4 | "Woodrow Wilson Bridge" | United States | Woodrow Wilson Bridge in Washington, D.C. | Under construction | December 9, 2005 (?) |
Activity since original air date: Completed
| 24 | 5 | "Gotthard Tunnel" | Switzerland | Gotthard Base Tunnel in Switzerland | Under construction | January 1, 2006 |
Activity since original air date: Completed
| 25 | 6 | "Dubai's Ski Resort" | United Arab Emirates | Ski Dubai | Under construction | January 21, 2006 |
Activity since original air date: Completed

=== Season 4: 2006 ===
Powderhouse Productions produced six episodes for season 4 with host Danny Forster. After ending of season 3 it airs under the Build It Bigger name on HD Theater, The Science Channel, and Discovery Channel.

| No. overall | No. in season | Title | Country | Project | Status at production | Original release date |
|---|---|---|---|---|---|---|
| 26 | 1 | "SuperStadium" | United States | Cardinals Stadium in Glendale, Arizona | Under construction | February 19, 2006 |
Activity since original air date: Completed
| 27 | 2 | "MegaTunnel" | Malaysia | Storm Management And Road Tunnel (SMART) in Kuala Lumpur | Under construction | March 8, 2006 |
Activity since original air date: Completed
| 28 | 3 | "Biggest Warship" | United States | USS George H.W. Bush | Completed | May 31, 2006 |
Activity since original air date: Completed
| 29 | 4 | "Sakhalin Oil & Ice" | Russia | Sakhalin-II on Sakhalin Island | Under construction | June 28, 2006 |
Activity since original air date: Completed
| 30 | 5 | "Big Easy Rebuild" | United States | Reconstruction of New Orleans after Hurricane Katrina | Under construction | July 5, 2006 |
Activity since original air date: Under construction (estimated completion N/A)
| 31 | 6 | "Space Tower" | Spain | Madrid's Torre Espacio | Under construction | July 12, 2006 |
Activity since original air date: Completed

=== Season 5: 2006 ===
| No. overall | No. in season | Title | Country | Project | Status at production | Original release date |
|---|---|---|---|---|---|---|
| 32 | 1 | "South Ferry Subway Station" | United States | The New York City Subway's new South Ferry station | Under construction | October 11, 2006 |
Activity since original air date: Completed
| 33 | 2 | "World's Biggest Arch Bridge" | United States | Mike O'Callaghan – Pat Tillman Memorial Bridge (the Hoover Dam Bypass) over the Colorado River | Under construction | October 18, 2006 |
Activity since original air date: Completed
| 34 | 3 | "JFK: JetBlue Terminal" | United States | Reconstruction of John F. Kennedy International Airport's Terminal 5 in New York City | Under construction | October 25, 2006 |
Activity since original air date: Completed
| 35 | 4 | "Stonecutters Bridge: Hong Kong" | Hong Kong | Hong Kong's Stonecutters Bridge | Under construction | November 1, 2006 |
Activity since original air date: Completed
| 36 | 5 | "California Academy of Sciences" | United States | The rebuilding of the California Academy of Sciences in San Francisco, California | Under construction | November 8, 2006 |
Activity since original air date: Completed
| 37 | 6 | "Hallandsås Ridge Tunnel: Sweden" | Sweden | Hallandsas railway tunnel | Under construction | November 15, 2006 |
Activity since original air date: Completed

=== Season 6: 2007 ===
| No. overall | No. in season | Title | Country | Project | Status at production | Original release date |
|---|---|---|---|---|---|---|
| 38 | 1 | "Coaster Build Off" | United States | Griffon steel rollercoaster in Busch Gardens Williamsburg and the Renegade in Valleyfair | Under construction | July 10, 2007 |
Activity since original air date: Completed
| 39 | 2 | "Battle Machines" | United States | An M1 Abrams tank undergoing maintenance at Anniston Army Depot, Alabama | Completed | July 17, 2007 |
Activity since original air date: Completed
| 40 | 3 | "World's Tallest Skyscraper" | China | Shanghai World Financial Centre in Shanghai, China | Under construction | July 24, 2007 |
Activity since original air date: Completed
| 41 | 4 | "Super Fast Warship" | United States | Building an Arleigh Burke-class destroyer for the U.S. Navy | Under construction | August 7, 2007 |
Activity since original air date: Completed
| 42 | 5 | "Boot Camp" | United States | Training to use construction equipment in Boston, Massachusetts. | Completed | August 14, 2007 |
Activity since original air date: Completed
| 43 | 6 | "Fault Zone Tunnel" | United States | Inland Feeder pipeline project to supply freshwater to Southern California | Under construction | August 21, 2007 |
Activity since original air date: Completed
| 44 | 7 | "Hurricane-Proof Homes" | United States | Building heavy duty modular homes | Completed | August 28, 2007 |
Activity since original air date: Completed
| 45 | 8 | "Floating City" | Bahamas | Independence of the Seas for Royal Caribbean International | Under construction | September 4, 2007 |
Activity since original air date: Completed
| 46 | 9 | "Biggest Casino" | United States | Construction of The Palazzo hotel casino in Las Vegas | Under construction | September 11, 2007 |
Activity since original air date: Completed
| 47 | 10 | "High Risk Tower" | United States | Construction of Trump's Tower in Chicago | Under construction | September 18, 2007 |
Activity since original air date: Completed
| 48 | 11 | "Turbo-Charged Boats" | United States | Rebuilding and practice test of an offshore racing boat | Completed | September 25, 2007 |
Activity since original air date: Completed
| 49 | 12 | "Mountain of Steel" | Spain | City of Culture of Galicia in Galicia | Under construction | October 3, 2007 |
Activity since original air date: Completed (Final two buildings cancelled.)
| 50 | 13 | "Deepest Tunnel" | Turkey | Construction of Marmaray underwater tunnel in Istanbul | Under construction | October 10, 2007 |
Activity since original air date: Completed
| 51 | 14 | "Major League Stadium" | United States | Construction of Nationals Park baseball stadium in Washington, D.C. | Under construction | October 17, 2007 |
Activity since original air date: Completed

=== Season 7: 2009 ===
| No. overall | No. in season | Title | Country | Project | Status at production | Original release date |
|---|---|---|---|---|---|---|
| 52 | 1 | "Dallas Cowboys Stadium" | United States | Building the new Cowboys Stadium for American football in Arlington, Texas, USA | Under construction | April 20, 2009 |
Activity since original air date: Completed
| 53 | 2 | "CityCenter, Las Vegas" | United States | The CityCenter development in Las Vegas aspires to change the desert vacationland into a continental metropolis | Under construction | April 21, 2009 |
Activity since original air date: Completed
| 54 | 3 | "Hong Kong Bridge" | Hong Kong | Building the Stonecutters Bridge in Hong Kong. | Under construction | April 27, 2009 |
Activity since original air date: Completed
| 55 | 4 | "Navy Amphibious Warship" | United States | The LPD-17 class of warship for the U.S. Navy. | Completed | May 4, 2009 |
Activity since original air date: Completed
| 56 | 5 | "Panama Canal" | Panama | New $5.25 billion expansion projects. | Under construction | May 11, 2009 |
Activity since original air date: Completed
| 57 | 6 | "Peru Dam & Tunnel" | Peru | Construction of the Limon Dam in Peru and one of the deepest tunnels ever attempted. | Completed and operational | May 18, 2009 |
Activity since original air date: Completed
| 58 | 7 | "Abu Dhabi" | United Arab Emirates | Al Raha Beach Development in Abu Dhabi | Under construction | June 1, 2009 |
Activity since original air date: Completed
| 59 | 8 | "NASA" | United States | Transition from the Space Shuttle program to the Constellation program. | Under construction | June 26, 2009 |
Activity since original air date: Partially canceled

=== Season 8: 2010 ===
| No. overall | No. in season | Title | Country | Project | Status at production | Original release date |
|---|---|---|---|---|---|---|
| 60 | 1 | "Singapore Sky Park" | Singapore | Singapore Sky Park | Under construction | April 8, 2010 |
Singapore Sky Park (now Marina Bay Sands) will hang 650 ft (198 m) in the air on top of three skyscrapers. Activity since original air date: Completed
| 61 | 2 | "Rio de Janeiro's Power Island Project" | Brazil | Simplício Hydroelectric Complex | Completed | April 15, 2010 |
Rio de Janeiro has frequent widespread blackouts. So Brazil is building one of the largest hydroelectric projects in the world, the Simplício Hydroelectric Complex. Activity since original air date: Completed
| 62 | 3 | "Kuwait Tower" | Kuwait | Al Hamra Tower | Under Construction | April 29, 2010 |
Kuwait's Al Hamra Tower is the world's tallest twisting structure. Activity since original air date: Completed
| 63 | 4 | "New Orleans Surge Barrier" | United States | New Orleans storm surge barrier | Under construction | May 9, 2010 |
In an attempt to save the city from another disaster, New Orleans is building the world's strongest hurricane protection system, including the largest storm surge barrier ever built and radical hurricane-resistant homes. Activity since original air date: Completed
| 64 | 5 | "South Africa's Mponeng Gold Mine" | South Africa | Mponeng Gold Mine | Under construction | May 13, 2010 |
Johannesburg, South Africa's Mponeng Gold Mine is the deepest place on Earth. Activity since original air date: Under construction (estimated completion N/A)
| 65 | 6 | "Overhauling the Bay Bridge" | United States | Eastern span replacement of the San Francisco–Oakland Bay Bridge | Under construction | May 20, 2010 |
Overhauling the San Francisco Bay Bridge is one of the biggest construction projects in the US. Activity since original air date: Completed
| 66 | 7 | "Melbourne Stadium" | Australia | Melbourne Rectangular Stadium | Under construction | May 27, 2010 |
Melbourne, Australia is building one of the most innovative stadiums ever built. With its unprecedented geodesic roof and advanced cladding, it will be the ultimate fan experience, and an icon for a city known as the sporting capital of the world. Activity since original air date: Completed
| 67 | 8 | "Gotthard Base Tunnel" | Switzerland | Gotthard Base Tunnel | Under construction | May 30, 2010 |
The Swiss government is spending 18 billion dollars to create the Gotthard Base Tunnel – the longest tunnel in the world, getting people and goods through the Alps up to three times faster and ultimately changing European transit forever. Activity since original air date: Completed
| 68 | 9 | "Abu Dhabi Central Market" | United Arab Emirates | Central Market Project | Under construction | June 17, 2010 |
Abu Dhabi's $15 billion Central Market will be a new cultural hub for an emerging world destination, complete with offices, parks, luxurious shops, and hotels – and all centered around the world's tallest residential tower, over 1250 feet high. Activity since original air date: Completed
| 69 | 10 | "Port of Rotterdam" | Netherlands | Port of Rotterdam | Under construction | July 1, 2010 |
Danny Forster goes behind the scenes at the Port of Rotterdam in the Netherlands, where crews are in the middle of the largest earth-moving project in history – all to triple the port's capacity, and help it serve the biggest ships on the planet. Activity since original air date: Completed

=== Season 9: 2011 ===
| No. overall | No. in season | Title | Country | Project | Status at production | Original release date |
|---|---|---|---|---|---|---|
| 70 | 1 | "Rebuilding New York City's Subway" | United States | New York City subway expansion | Under construction | April 8, 2011 |
Examining subway work under New York City, where crews are expanding the transit systems of Second Avenue Subway and East Side Access as part of a large public works project. Activity since original air date: Second Avenue Subway: Completed (Phase 1); East Side Access: Completed 2023
| 71 | 2 | "Drought-Proofing Australia" | Australia | Wonthaggi desalination plant | Under construction | April 15, 2011 |
After 13 years of record-breaking droughts Melbourne looks to secure its future with a $3.5 billion Wonthaggi desalination plant that will turn saltwater into freshwater. Danny joins crews as they build two undersea tunnels, 29 buildings and 52 miles of pipeline. Activity since original air date: Completed
| 72 | 3 | "Azerbaijan's Amazing Transformation" | Azerbaijan | Flame Towers and Heydar Aliyev Cultural Centre | Under construction | April 22, 2011 |
After decades of neglect under the Soviet Union, Azerbaijan is reinventing itself. With a $6 billion a year renovation and over 500 new developments, Danny Forster goes behind the scenes of Baku's construction projects: the Flame Towers and Heydar Aliyev Cultural Centre. Activity since original air date: Completed
| 73 | 4 | "London's Olympic Aquatic Stadium" | United Kingdom | London Aquatics Centre | Completed (Not publicly open until 2014) | April 29, 2011 |
The London Aquatics Centre will host 44 swimming and diving events during the 2012 Summer Olympics and live on as a new addition to the London landscape. Danny Forster goes with crews as they construct one of the most advanced swimming facilities ever built. Activity since original air date: Completed
| 74 | 5 | "Constructing Serbia's Largest Bridge" | Serbia | Ada Bridge | Under construction | June 18, 2011 |
Danny Forster joins crews as they construct Serbia's newest national icon. The Sava River Bridge in Belgrade is the world's largest single pylon cable stayed bridge, upgrading a critical freight corridor connecting Central Europe to the East. Activity since original air date: Completed
| 75 | 6 | "Amsterdam's Futuristic Floating City" | Netherlands | Netherlands land expansion | Under construction | June 25, 2011 |
The Netherlands is running out of land. Nearly 70% of its land, which comprises half its population lies beneath sea level. Rather than fight back the sea, engineers are radically making it an ally, The new city of IJburg is to create real estate where none exists. Activity since original air date: Partially completed
| 76 | 7 | "Building Mumbai's Modern Airport" | India | Chhatrapati Shivaji International Airport | Under construction | July 2, 2011 |
The $2 billion Mumbai Airport expansion project is one of India's most ambitious undertakings aiming to improve Mumbai's Infrastructure for economic growth. If they succeed to build this breathtaking piece of engineering, it could completely change the way airports are designed. Activity since original air date: Completed
| 77 | 8 | "Turkey's Mammoth Hydropower Dam" | Turkey | Deriner Dam | Under construction | July 9, 2011 |
Crews are now carving out Turkey's largest construction site in the country's most challenging terrain by building one of the tallest and strongest dams ever made, the Deriner Dam. Activity since original air date: Completed

== See also ==
- Mega Builders
- Megastructures, a similar show on the National Geographic Channel
- Impossible Engineering
