= Millennium Tower (Tokyo) =

Visionary skyscraper

- ミレニアムタワー

General information
- Status: Visionary
- Type: residential / office
- Architectural style: Futurism, Glass

Height
- Height: 840 m / 2,756 ft

Technical details
- Floor count: 180

Design and construction
- Architect: Foster + Partners
- Developer: Obayashi Corporation

Millennium Tower was a 180-floor skyscraper that was envisioned by architect Sir Norman Foster in 1989. He intended for it to be built in Tokyo Bay, 2 km offshore from Tokyo, Japan.

== Design ==
The design calls for a cone-shaped pyramid 840 meters high, with a base about as big as the Tokyo Olympic Stadium and glass sides for natural lighting. It is intended to be constructed on water, with boat and bridge access. Since the tower was planned for an area with frequent earthquakes and hurricane-strength winds, the shape is aerodynamic to reduce wind stress, and helical bands are wrapped around the tower for structural support. Steel tanks at the top of the tower are filled with water, and can be rotated as a counterweight against wind.

The tower is a self-contained arcology containing one million square meters of commercial development and housing for 60,000 people, split into sections. Offices and light or clean industries are in the lower levels, apartments above, and the top section houses communications systems and wind or solar generators. Restaurants and viewing platforms would be interspersed through all sections.

Horizontal and vertical high-speed metro lines provide long-distance travel, with cars designed to carry 160 people stopping at intermediate five-story 'sky centers' on every thirtieth floor. Each 'sky center' is decorated by gardens and mezzanines, and provides a particular service such as hotels or restaurants. Short-distance travel is by elevators or escalators.

== History ==
The tower design was commissioned by the Obayashi Corporation as an arcology, intended to address land shortage and overpopulation in Tokyo.
