= Robert A. Agresta =

American lawyer

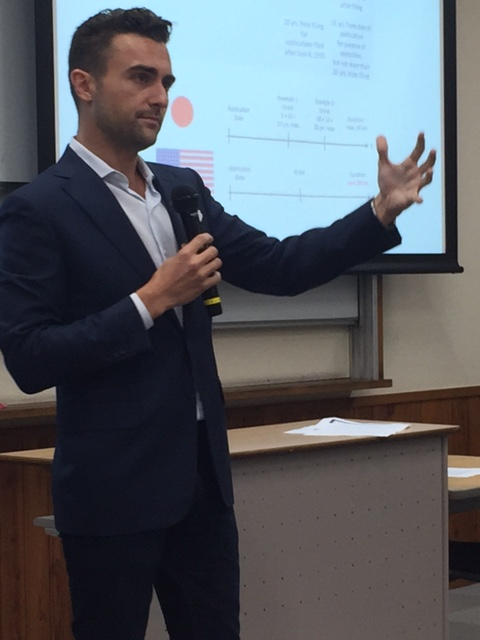
- Agresta in August 2015
- Born: Robert Anthony Agresta; March 31, 1983 (age 43)
- Education: Universität St. Gallen (EMBL-HSG); New York Law School (JD); Fordham University (BS)
- Occupation: Attorney
- Spouse: Natalie Agresta (m. 2019)
- Website: McLaughlin & Stern

Robert Anthony Agresta (born March 31, 1983) is an American corporate lawyer. He is a partner at McLaughlin & Stern LLP, a New York City law firm, where he chairs the Family Office & Private Wealth Advisory practice. He previously served as Council President in Englewood Cliffs, New Jersey.

== Biography ==
Agresta is the son of the Joseph A. Agresta Sr. and Darel Christensen Agresta. Raised in Englewood Cliffs, New Jersey, Agresta graduated from Dwight-Englewood School in 2005.

Agresta is a dual citizen of Italy and the United States and is a Young Leader of the American Swiss Foundation. He earned a bachelor's degree from Fordham University in 2005, a Juris Doctor from New York Law School in 2009 and an MBA from the Universität St. Gallen in Switzerland in 2015, where he has lectured on strategy in law and business. He speaks English, Italian, German, and Spanish.

== Professional career ==
Agresta is admitted to the bars of Wyoming, New York, the District of Columbia, and New Jersey. He represents family offices and closely held enterprises on governance, succession, and cross-border wealth strategy. Agresta's practice has included complex commercial litigation, among it antitrust and civil RICO matters, in state and federal courts. In 2017, he published "International Tax Planning as a Business Driver" in the Penn State Journal of Law and International Affairs.

== Political career ==
In November 2008, Agresta was elected as a Republican together with running mate Eric Petrone to serve a three-year term as a councilman in the Borough of Englewood Cliffs, New Jersey, defeating two Democratic incumbents. In January 2010, Agresta was voted president of the borough council by the new Republican majority on the body.
