= Traverse (magazine) =

Magazine

Traverse, Northern Michigan's Magazine
- Frequency: Monthly
- Circulation: 23,000
- Publisher: Deborah Wyatt Fellows
- First issue: 1981
- Company: Prism Publications
- Country: USA
- Based in: Traverse City, Michigan
- Language: English
- Website: http://www.mynorth.com/
- ISSN: 0746-2735

Traverse, Northern Michigan's Magazine is a monthly magazine about life in Northern Michigan including Petoskey, Mackinac Island, Harbor Springs, Frankfort, Traverse City, Leelanau County, the Upper Peninsula, and more. Founded in June, 1981, The magazine has 23,000 subscribers throughout the country and sells 8,000 copies on newsstands throughout the Midwest.

Launched in 2008, MyNorth.com is the online home of Traverse, Northern Michigan’s Magazine and a portal to the Northern Michigan lifestyle. At MyNorth.com readers can access news plus a complete database of Northern Michigan attractions, travel ideas like Sleeping Bear Dunes and Mackinac, outdoors recreation, restaurant hot spots, wineries, breweries, northern style and events across Northern Michigan. The pages of Traverse Magazine are filled with four-color photography and articles on food, wine, restaurants, outdoors recreation, events, essays, history and Northern Michigan lifestyle. Other magazines produced by the staff of Traverse Magazine include Northern Home & Cottage, MyNorth Vacation Guide, MyNorth Wedding, Meetings North, Senior Living, and Holidays Up North. Books published include The Cottage Cookbook and Reflections of a Life Up North.
