= Mega Builders =

- Country of origin: Canada
- Original language: English
- No. of series: 5
- No. of episodes: 36

Production
- Running time: 45 minutes (without commercials)
- Production companies: Barna-Alper Productions; Mega Builders III Productions

Original release
- Network: Discovery Channel
- Release: 19 September 2005 – 16 December 2010

Mega Builders is a documentary television series appearing on the Discovery Channel and Science Channel. Each episode takes a look into the people and the machines involved into the construction of many huge engineering projects.

Discovery Channel Taiwan broadcast a version of the series in 2022 that covered how the residential high-rise building Tao Zhu Yin Yuan was built over 11 years.

== Episode list ==
=== Season 1 ===
Episode	Name	Airdate
S01E01	Spanning the Harlem	19/Sep/2005
S01E02	Fantasy Islands	19/Sep/2005
S01E03	The Big Collider	24/Nov/2005
S01E04	World's Fastest Wheels	09/Dec/2005

=== Season 2 ===
Episode	Name	Airdate
S02E01	Racing to Power Up	24/Aug/2006
S02E02	Quake-Proofing an Icon	25/Oct/2006
S02E03	Roller Coaster	09/Nov/2006
S02E04	Mega Bridge	22/Nov/2006
S02E05	Moving Mountains	29/Nov/2006
S02E06	Madrid's Big Dig	10/Jan/2007
S02E07	Crossing Colorado	17/Jan/2007
S02E08	Sinking Wings	24/Jan/2007
S02E09	Extreme Elevation	31/Jan/2007

=== Season 3 ===
Episode	Name	Airdate
S03E01	Raising The Roof	05/Sep/2007
S03E02	The Big Lift	12/Sep/2007
S03E03	Worlds Biggest Wave Machine	19/Sep/2007
S03E04	Stolen Power	26/Sep/2007
S03E05	Mighty Shovel	03/Oct/2007
S03E06	Ice Hotel	10/Oct/2007
S03E07	Arctic Ice Crusher	17/Oct/2007

=== Season 4 ===
Episode	Name	Airdate
S04E01	Big Rig	14/Oct/2009
S04E02	Blockbuster Bridge	21/Oct/2009
S04E03	Floating Bridge	28/Oct/2009
S04E04	Glitz City	04/Nov/2009
S04E05	Hard Rock Park	11/Nov/2009
S04E06	King of the Container Ships	18/Nov/2009
S04E07	Venice Code Red	25/Nov/2009

=== Season 5 ===
Episode	Name	Airdate
S05-E01	Bosphorus Tunnel	28/Oct/2010
S05-E02	Illogical Crossing	04/Nov/2010
S05-E03	Peak Power	11/Nov/2010
S05-E04	World Class Stadium	18/Nov/2010
S05-E05	Spanning the Saigon River	02/Dec/2010
S05-E06	London Aquatics Centre	09/Dec/2010
S05-E07	Gautrain	16/Dec/2010

== Reception ==
Noting that the show covers the Bhumibol Bridge, Gotthard Base Tunnel, and North American and Madrid initiatives to reduce traffic congestion, The Daily Telegraph's Kirsty Heysen said, "This great series some of these hugely ambitious undertakings." Brad Newsome of The Age praised the show, writing, "It's not your average construction-telly yawn tonight as we follow the annual building of Sweden's famed ice hotel." The Sunday Mail stated, "Colourful characters and bigger-than Ben Hur projects fill this latest series about the world's largest and most mind-boggling engineering challenges." The Brazilian newspaper Correio 24 Horas wrote that Mega Builders "is quite enlightening about the reasons why Rio de Janeiro, the Olympic city, is currently left without any good-quality stadium in working order".

== See also ==
- Extreme Engineering
- Megastructures (TV series)
- Ultimate Factories
