= Ultimate Factories =

- DVD cover
- Narrated by: Christopher Cook
- Country of origin: United States
- Original language: English
- No. of episodes: 70

Production
- Running time: 50 minutes
- Production company: Hoff Productions

Original release
- Network: National Geographic Channel
- Release: 2006 – November 22, 2013

Ultimate Factories, also known as Megafactories in non-US markets, is an American documentary television series that premiered in 2006 on the National Geographic Channel. The program explored the inner workings of factories worldwide. Each episode profiles the machinery and manpower behind each factory's main product, featuring close-ups, breakdowns, interviews, and side stories to show the sequence of events to produce the product in the factory.

== History ==
National Geographic Megafactories was also broadcast under the name Ultimate Factories in the United States. The show was an hour long television program and they featured a variety of factories. National Geographic's camera crews were able to get raw footage for a one hour program in seven days.

== Episodes ==
As of 11 August 2013, the National Geographic Channel has broadcast the following episodes of the series:

=== Season 1 (2006–2007) ===
№	Title	Factories	Product location	Establish	Owner name
1	Ferrari	Follows the production of the 599 GTB Fiorano car.	2006	Nov 9, 2006	
2	M-1 Tank	Follows the production of the M1 Abrams main battle tank.	2006	Nov 30, 2006	
3	Harley-Davidson	Follows the production of the Harley-Davidson V-Rod motorcycle.	2006	Jan 28, 2007	
4	Budweiser	Follows the production of Budweiser beer.	2007	Jan 28, 2007	
5	Peterbilt	Follows the production of the Model 387 truck at the Peterbilt factory in Denton, Texas.	2006	Jan 28, 2007	
6	John Deere	Follows the production of the STS combine harvester.	2006	Jan 31, 2007	
7	Apache Helicopter	Follows the production of the Boeing AH-64 Apache helicopter at the Boeing factory.	2006	Feb 15, 2007	

=== Season 2 (2007–2008) ===
№	Title	Description	© Year	Original airdate
1	BMW	Follows the production of the BMW Z4 car.	2007	Nov 29, 2007
2	Corvette	Follows the production of the Corvette Z06 car.	2007	Nov 29, 2007
3	Winnebago	Follows the production of the Winnebago motor homes, a type of recreational vehicle (RV).	2007	Jan 28, 2008
4	Caterpillar	Follows the production of the Caterpillar 797B.	2007	Jan 28, 2008
5	UPS Worldport	Megafactories episode name: "High-Speed Delivery". Follows the working of Worldport, worldwide air hub for United Parcel Service.	2007	Jun 12, 2008
6	Fire Trucks	Follows the production of a Pierce Manufacturing fire truck.	2007	Jun 19, 2008
7	Armoured Cars	Follows the production of armored civilian and law-enforcement vehicles at Alpine Armoring in Chantilly, Virginia.	2008	Unknown

=== Season 3 (2009–2010) ===
№	Title	Description	© Year	Original airdate
1	Lamborghini	Follows the production of the Lamborghini Murcielago SV car.	2009	Oct 1, 2009
2	Rolls-Royce	Follows the production of the Rolls-Royce Phantom car, including an insight on the company's "Bespoke" program.	2009	Oct 8, 2009
3	Camaro	Follows the production of the 2010 Chevrolet Camaro Synergy Special Edition car.	2009	Oct 15, 2009
4	Porsche	Follows the production of the Porsche 911 GT3 car.	2009	Oct 22, 2009
5	IKEA	Follows the production of IKEA products at its factories in Poland and Sweden.	2009	Nov 5, 2009
6	NYC Subway Car	Follows the production of the R160 subway car.	2009	Nov 12, 2009
7	Audi	Follows the production of the Audi R8 car at Neckarsulm, Germany.	2009	Mar 13, 2010
8	Chevy Volt	Follows the production of the Chevrolet Volt.	2010	Mar 25, 2010

=== Season 4 (2011) ===
№	Title	Description	© Year	Original airdate
1	Dodge Challenger	Follows the production of the third generation Dodge Challenger.	2010	Feb 3, 2011
2	Maserati	Follows the production of the Maserati GranTurismo.	2010	Feb 10, 2011
3	Dodge Viper	Follows the production of the 2010 Dodge Viper.	2010	Feb 17, 2011
4	Mercedes-Benz	Follows the production of the Mercedes-Benz SLS AMG.	2010	Feb 24, 2011
5	Bentley	Follows the production of the Bentley Mulsanne.	2010	Mar 3, 2011
6	Jack Daniel's	Follows the production of Jack Daniel's Old No. 7.	2010	Mar 11, 2011
7	Coca-Cola	Follows the production of Coca-Cola.	2010	Mar 17, 2011

=== Season 5 (2011-2012) ===
Because the season number, episode number and some of the airdates cannot be confirmed, these episodes are listed by their production / copyright year listed at the end of the credits of the show.

№	Title	Description	© Year	Original airdate
1	Aston Martin Supercar	Follows the production of the 77-only Aston Martin One-77 Supercar.	2011	Sep 4, 2011
2	BMW X3	Follows the production of the BMW X3, a type of compact crossover SUV.	2011	Nov 1, 2011
3	Porsche Panamera		2011	Jan 7, 2012
4	Mack Truck	Follows the production of the Mack Titan, an American truck-manufacturing company.	2011	Jan 14, 2012
5	LEGO	Follows the production of LEGO.	2011	Jan 21, 2012
6	Frito Lay	Follows the making and distribution of potato chips, cheese puffs and tortilla chips at the biggest Frito Lay factory in Perry, Georgia	2011	Jan 28, 2012
7	Ford F-150		2011	Feb 4, 2012
8	Bacardi	Goes into the Bacardi manufacturing plant and explores how the famous rum is made.	2011	Feb 11, 2012
9	Ducati	Follows the production of the Ducati motorbike.	2011	Feb 18, 2012
10	Heineken	Follows the production of Heineken beer.	2011	Feb 25, 2012
11	Eurofighter	Follows the production of the Eurofighter Typhoon fighterjet.	2011	Mar 3, 2012
12	Bugatti	Follows the production of the Bugatti Veyron hypercar.	2011	Mar 31, 2012
13	MV Agusta	Follows the production of the MV Agusta F3 675 motorcycle	2011	Apr 28, 2012
14	Lotus Evora (Series 6 Ep1)		2011	Unknown
15	Williams F1 (Series 6 Ep2)		2011	Unknown
16	Guinness beer (Series 6 Ep4)		2011	Unknown
17	Swiss Army Knife (Series 6 Ep5)		2011	Unknown
18	The MINI (Series 7 Ep1)	The Mini Coupe	2011	Unknown
19	Michelin (Series7 Ep4)		2011	Unknown
20	Illy Coffee (Series 7 Ep7)		2011	Unknown
21	Jaguar XJ		2011	Unknown
22	Speed Rail	Alstom AGV	2011	Unknown
23	Swedish Super Car	Koenigsegg Agera	2011	Unknown
24	Super Chopper	Follows the production of the AgustaWestlandAW139 outside Milan, Italy	2011	Unknown
25	Mercedes Overhaul (Series 8 Ep1)	Truck	2011	Unknown
26	Ford	Ford Mustang Shelby GT-500	2011	Unknown
27	Ferrari	Ferrari FF	2011	Unknown
28	Lamborghini	Lamborghini Aventador LP700-4	2011	Unknown
29	Piaggio	Piaggio Vespa	2011	Unknown

=== Season 6 (2013) ===
Because the season number, episode number and airdate cannot be confirmed, these episodes are listed by their production / copyright year listed at the end of the credits of the show

№	Title	Description	© Year	Original airdate
1	EA Sports: FIFA 12 (Series 6 Ep3 )		2012	Unknown
2	Boeing 747 (Series7 Ep2)		2012	Unknown
3	Learjet (Series7 Ep3)	Follows the production of the $14 million Learjet 60XR	2012	Unknown
4	Pyrotechnics (Series 7 Ep5)		2012	Unknown
5	Tata Nano (Series7 Ep6 )		2012	Unknown
6	Corvette ZR1 (Series 7 Ep8 )		2012	Unknown
7	Extreme Roller Coaster (Series 7 Ep9 )		2012	Unknown
8	Pagani	Pagani Huayra	2012	Unknown
9	Porsche	Porsche 911	2012	Unknown
10	Tesla	Model S	2012	Unknown
11	Lexus	Lexus LFA	2012	Unknown
12	Nissan	Nissan GT-R	2012	Nov 15, 2012
13	Gumpert Apollo		2012	Dec 20, 2012

?	Armored Troop Carrier	Iveco	?	Unknown
?	Wargaming	World of Tanks	?	Nov 22, 2013

== Reception ==
Kirby Garlitos from Top Speed said, because the show has featured exotic vehicles, it has always been a hot ticket.

== See also ==
- Mega Builders
