= 9/11 Tribute Museum =

Museum in Manhattan, New York

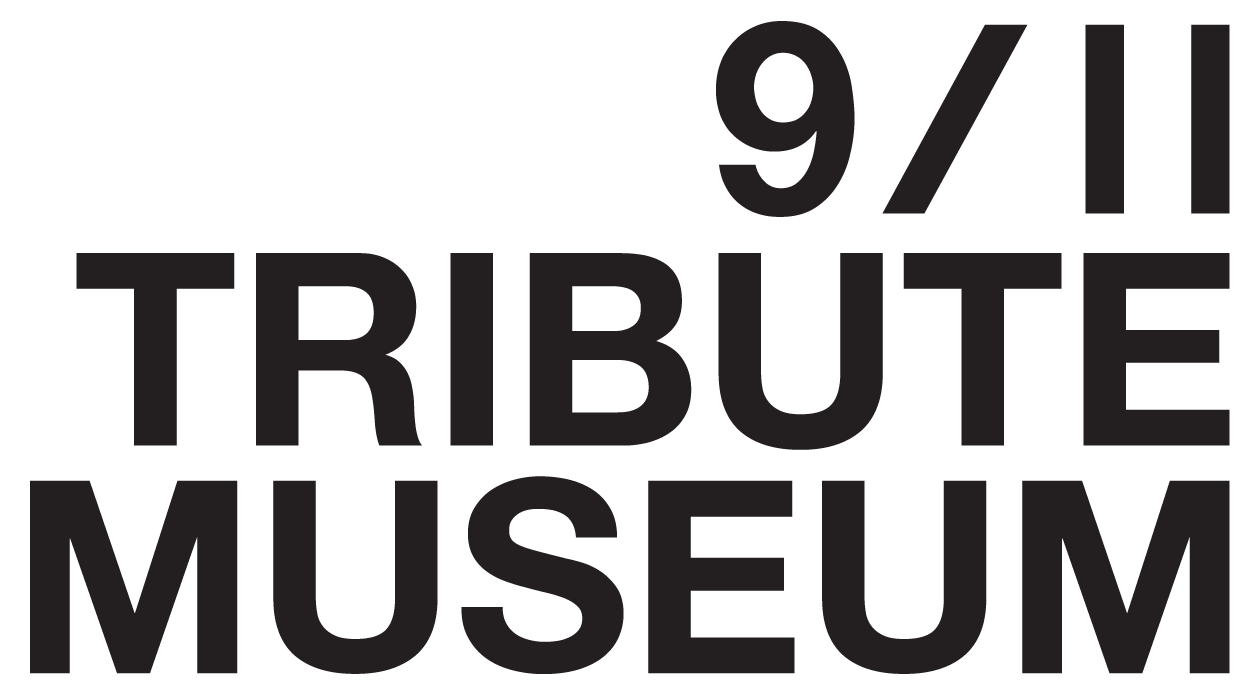
- Former names: 9/11 Tribute Center, Tribute WTC Visitor Center

General information
- Status: Closed
- Type: Museum
- Coordinates: 40°42′36.299″N 74°0′44.70″W
- Opening: September 6, 2006

Website
- 911tributemuseum.org

The 9/11 Tribute Museum, formerly known as the 9/11 Tribute Center and Tribute WTC, was a museum that shared the personal stories of family members who lost loved ones, survivors, rescue and recovery workers, volunteers and Lower Manhattan residents with those who want to learn about the September 11 attacks. It was located in the Financial District section of Manhattan in New York City, and offered walking tours and galleries with 9/11 artifacts and history before it transitioned to a solely online museum in August 2022.

== Organization ==
The 9/11 Tribute Museum is a 501(c)3 non-profit, and is a project of the September 11th Families' Association. While the larger National September 11 Memorial & Museum focuses on those who died, Tribute has maintained their focus on the survivors.

The 9/11 Tribute Museum provides educational experiences for visitors and a central place for the local community and victims' families and friends to gather and share their personal experiences with the public.

The museum did not have an endowment and focused on admissions income for its operations.

== History ==
The 9/11 Tribute Museum, formerly known as the 9/11 Tribute Center and Tribute WTC Visitor Center, is a project of the September 11th Families’ Association. The September 11th Families’ Association was created by widows and other family members of those killed in the 9/11 attacks. The Association established a mission to unite and support all victims of terrorism through communication, representation and peer support.

The 9/11 Tribute Center opened on September 6, 2006, across the street from the World Trade Center site and next to the Engine 10/Ladder 10 Firehouse of the New York City Fire Department. It was located in the former Liberty Deli, where meals and supplies were given to rescue workers in the attacks' aftermath. The Association renovated the space to create an educational center with photos, artifacts, and stories shared by the community. In June 2017, the Museum moved to 92 Greenwich Street, a location that provided it with more exhibit space.

Although the 9/11 Tribute Center opened first, it has remained the smaller of the city's two museums dedicated to 9/11. The museum's landlord Thor Equities placed 92 Greenwich Street for sale in November 2019, which would have forced the museum to relocate or close. The impact of the COVID-19 pandemic on tourism ultimately led the museum to announce in March 2022 that it would close. The museum shuttered its physical location on August 17, 2022, and moved all of its exhibits online. The museum's physical location had attracted five million visitors and given 500,000 guided tours throughout its existence.

== Tours ==
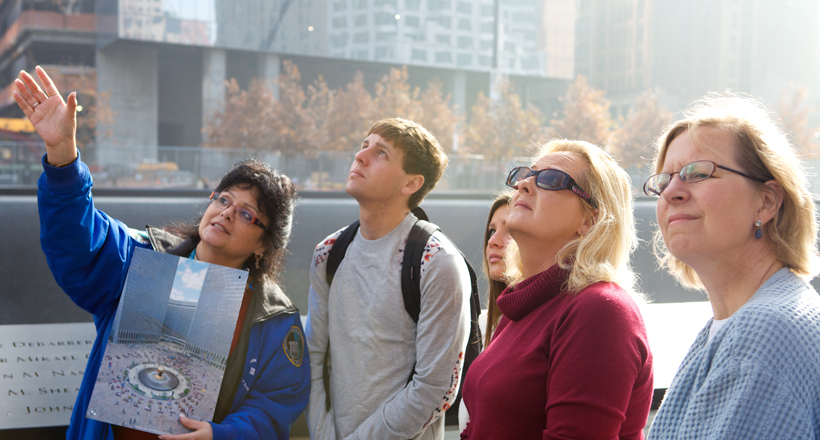
9/11 Tribute Museum volunteer giving a guided tour of the 9/11 Memorial

The 9/11 Tribute Museum has trained volunteer guides who all have personal 9/11 experiences. The museum had 900 trained tour guides, some of whom came from as far away as Northern Virginia. Tours took visitors on a walk through the 9/11 Memorial Plaza, with stops at other significant locations such as the Firefighters' Memorial Wall and the Survivor Tree. These tours ceased when the museum closed its physical location on August 17, 2022.

== See also ==
- Construction of the World Trade Center
- World Trade Center (1973–2001)
- Memorials and services for the September 11 attacks
