= Megastructures (TV series) =

- Narrated by: Jonathan Hart, Tom Goodman-Hill, Greg Stebner, Marlon Singleton
- Theme music composer: David Sharp
- Composer: Stuart Fox (1 episode)
- Country of origin: United States
- Original language: English
- No. of seasons: 6
- No. of episodes: 100+

Production
- Producer: Hoff Productions (16 eps)
- Running time: 1-hour (inc. commercials)

Original release
- Network: National Geographic Channel, Channel 5, France 5, 7mate
- Release: 2004 – 2009

Megastructures is a documentary television series appearing on the National Geographic Channel in the United States and the United Kingdom, Channel 5 in the United Kingdom, France 5 in France, and 7mate in Australia.

Each episode is an educational look of varying depth into the construction, operation, and staffing of various structures or construction projects, but not ordinary construction products.

Generally containing interviews with designers and project managers, it presents the problems of construction and the methodology or techniques used to overcome obstacles. In some cases (such as the Akashi-Kaikyo Bridge and Petronas Towers) this involved the development of new materials or products that are now in general use within the construction industry.

Megastructures focuses on constructions that are extreme; in the sense that they are the biggest, tallest, longest, or deepest in the world. Alternatively, a project may appear if it had an element of novelty or are a world first (such as Dubai's Palm Islands). This type of project is known as a megaproject.

The series follows similar subjects as the History Channel's Modern Marvels and Discovery Channel's Extreme Engineering, covering areas of architecture, transport, construction and manufacturing.

== Episodes ==
=== Season 1 (2004) ===
#	Country	Title	Subject	US airdate	Five Co-production airdate
01	United States	USS Ronald Reagan	Nimitz-class supercarrier for the U.S. Navy — USS Ronald Reagan is a 4.5 billion-dollar Nimitz-class supercarrier. Powered by two nuclear reactors, the 1,100 ft (340 m) long vessel is equipped with all the necessary facilities to house 6,000 personnel and over 80 aircraft. Viewers are given an exclusive look at how the crew of this 'floating naval base' is put through a series of tests in order to obtain their flight deck certification. Take a glimpse at the various facilities on the ship that keep the 6,000-strong crew fed, rested, and entertained.	2004-09-15	
02	Germany	Autobahn	German Autobahnen — What began as a racing track grew into a sophisticated high-speed road system, linking to almost all the major cities in Germany. The Autobahn boasts super thick road beds, 4% or less grades, wide lanes, and utilises sophisticated technology.	2004-10-06	
03	United Kingdom; France	Channel Tunnel	Undersea tunnel between Coquelles, France and Folkestone, United Kingdom — The Channel Tunnel or Euro Tunnel is one of the world's longest underground rail tunnels, and links England with France. Consisting of two rail tunnels and a small service tunnel, it totals 153 km in length. This episode looks at the race between the British and the French to complete the tunnelling of the Channel Tunnel and the obstacles faced in its construction.	2004-09-22	2004-09-13
04	United States	Sears Tower	Tallest building in Chicago, Illinois — For 20 years, the Sears Tower held the record for the world's tallest building. Completed in 1973, the 110 stories high building is almost half a kilometre tall. And it still holds the record for having the world's highest antenna. John Zils, structural engineer and designer of this mega-structure, shares some of the tower's secrets. And get a behind-the-scenes look at some of the various systems and controls that are vital to the building, such as security monitoring, elevators, the water and power distribution that supplies its many floors, and even the machines that clean the windows. The Sears Tower is now called the Willis Tower.	2004-09-29	
05	Japan	Kansai International Airport	Airport on artificial island in Osaka Bay — Located 5 km off the coast of Osaka, Japan is the Kansai International Airport. The airport is built entirely on a man-made island, 4 km long and 1 km wide. The only link between the island and Osaka is by the world's longest 2-tiered bridge. Although the airport is built to withstand earthquakes and typhoons, the artificial island itself is sinking faster than anticipated. This episode looks at various measures that are taken to keep the airport 'afloat,' and the various facilities and services available to keep the airport running.	2004-10-13	
06	Japan	Akashi Kaikyo Bridge	World's longest suspension bridge — In 1955, two ferries sank along the Akashi Strait in Japan, killing 168 children. The tragedy led to 30 years of research to design a bridge that would link Awaji Island to Kobe. The bridge would need to be able to withstand severe earthquakes and typhoons. In 1988, Japan began construction of the world's longest, highest and most expensive suspension bridge. This episode presents a stage by stage look at the construction of the bridge, and the obstacles faced in its construction, including the Kobe earthquake in 1995.	2004-10-20	2004-09-20
07	Brazil Paraguay	The World's Most Powerful Dam (Itaipu Dam)	Dam on the Paraná River — In the Paraná River of South America, lies the Itaipú Dam. Costing 20 billion dollars, the Itaipú Dam is the world's largest and most powerful hydroelectric power plant. It is the culmination of the efforts, accomplishments, and co-operation of two countries, Brazil and Paraguay. This episode examines the efforts undertaken and the sacrifices made to construct the dam, including how the largest diversion channel was constructed to divert water from the world's 7th largest river away from the main construction site.	2004-10-27	2004-09-27
08	Malaysia	Petronas Towers	Twin tower skyscraper in Kuala Lumpur — Designed by Cesar Pelli, the Petronas Towers were the tallest buildings as of their completion date. Located in Kuala Lumpur, the 88 story, 450m tall twin towers carry an Islamic geometrical influence, and are a symbol of Malaysian pride. To foster competition, the contract for the construction of the towers was awarded to two different construction companies, each assigned to work on one of the towers. This episode examines the race between the companies to each complete their tower first, as well as various construction challenges, including soil quality issues, the unique cement mixture that was needed as a steel substitute, and tropical weather.	2004-11-10	2004-10-04
09	United States	Inside a Super Casino	The Borgata Hotel Casino & Spa in Atlantic City, New Jersey — Megastructures gets an inside look at the 13-year design and construction of Atlantic City's towering new casino, the Borgata.	2004-12-01	
10	United States	Money Factory	U.S. Treasury	2004-12-31	

=== Season 2 (2005) ===
#	Country	Title	Subject	Original airdate	Credits
01	United States	Golden Gate Bridge	Iconic bridge over San Francisco Bay in San Francisco	2005-03-02	
02	United States	Alcatraz	Former prison island in San Francisco Bay, California	2005-03-16	
03	United States	Inside The Pentagon	Headquarters of the US Department of Defense in Arlington, Virginia	2005-04-01	
04	Singapore	World's Busiest Port	Port of Singapore, Republic of Singapore	2005-05-13	
05	South Africa	Tau Tona, City of Gold	World's deepest mining operations in Carletonville, South Africa	2005-05-21	
06	United States	Las Vegas		2005-06-22	
07	Canada	Ultimate Oil Sands Mine; Black Gold (Oil Mine)	Syncrude and Shell Canada in oil sands located in Alberta, Canada	2005-07-20	
08	Canada	Diamond Diggers	Ekati Diamond Mine, Canada's first diamond mine, near Lac De Gras, Northwest Territories, Canada	2005-07-27	
09	United States	Sea Launch	Ocean Odyssey and Sea Launch Commander	2005-08-03	
10	Netherlands	North Sea Wall	Delta Works	2005-05-28 on NGC (UK)	
11	United Arab Emirates	The World's Most Extreme Island (Impossible Islands)	Dubai's artificial palm islands, United Arab Emirates	2005-09-13	
12	United States	Indianapolis Motor Speedway	Car racetrack in Speedway, Indiana	2005-09-13	
13	Netherlands	Port of Rotterdam (Super Port)	The largest port in Europe, in Rotterdam, Netherlands	2005-09-20	
14	United States	Air Force Transport (Mega Plane)	C-5 Galaxy with the U.S. Air Force	2005-09-20	
15	United States	North Branch Correctional Institution (Hi-Tech Prison)	High Security Prison, Allegany County, Maryland	2005-09-27	
16	France	Airbus A380 (World's Biggest Airliner)	Biggest jumbo jet in commercial service	2005-10-04	
17	United States	USS Virginia	Virginia-class submarine with the U.S. Navy	2005-10-11	
18	United States	Ultimate Casino	Venetian Hotel Resort Casino in Las Vegas, Nevada	2005-10-18	
19	United States	The Ultimate Roller coaster	Kingda Ka roller coaster at Six Flags Great Adventure theme part in Jackson, New Jersey	2005-10-25	
20	United States	Spy Fortress NORAD	North American Aerospace Defense Command, Colorado	2005-11-08	
21	Germany	Berlin Train Terminal (Berlin's Grand Central)	Berlin Hauptbahnhof station in Berlin, Germany	2005-11-15	
22	United States	America's Big Dig	Central Artery / Tunnel Project in Boston, Massachusetts	2005-11-22	
23	Netherlands	Ultimate Oil Rigs	Construction of new oil rigs	2005-12-06	
24	Kazakhstan	Baikonur Cosmodrome	Russian space launch facility in Tyuratam, Kazakhstan	2005-12-13	
25	United States	Inside Grand Central	Railroad terminal in New York City.	2005-12-08	
26	France	World's Tallest Bridge (Millau Bridge)	viaduct near Millau, France	2005-12-20	
27	China	Mega Ship	Orient Overseas Container Line / OOCL Atlanta ship	2005-12-27	
28	-	Deep Sea Drillers		2005-12-31	

=== Season 3 (2006) ===
#	Country	Title	Subject	Original airdate	Credits
01	Germany	Berlin Wall	Wall dividing Germany during the Cold War	2006-03-14	
02	Denmark Sweden	Megabridges: Denmark to Sweden	Oresund Bridge between Copenhagen and Malmö, Sweden	2006-04-18	
03	Greece	Megabridges: Greece	Rio–Antirrio bridge, Gulf of Corinth, Greece	2006-05-02	
04	United States	Hoover Dam	Colorado River border between Nevada and Arizona in USA	2006-02-11 on Five	
05	United States	Inside "NCIS"	Naval Criminal Investigative Service of the U.S. Navy	2006-05-30	
06	United States	Garbage Mountain	Puente Hills Landfill in Whittier, California	2006-08-01	
07	Sweden	Ice Hotel	Working hotel made of ice near Jukkasjärvi, Sweden	2006-08-01	
08		Supertanker	Seri Amanah, a Liquified Natural Gas (LNG) carrier ship	2006-08-31	
10	Panama	Panama Canal Unlocked	Panama Canal Expansion Project, Central America	2006-10-19	
12	Iceland	Rockeaters of Iceland	Kárahnjúkar Hydropower Plant	2006-12-31	

=== Season 4 (2007–2008) ===
#	Country	Title	Subject	Original airdate	Credits
01	United Arab Emirates	World's Tallest Hotel	Burj al-Arab Hotel in Dubai, United Arab Emirates	2007-07-09	
02	Malaysia	SMART Tunnel	SMART Tunnel for road and storm water drainage in Kuala Lumpur to relieve traffic congestion as well as to prevent flooding within the city	2007-07-14	
03	Bermuda	RMS Queen Mary 2		2007-07-16 on Five	
04	United States	South Pole Station	A science facility at the South Pole (Amundsen–Scott South Pole Station)	2007-11-06	
05	China	Beijing Water Cube	Beijing National Aquatics Center built for the 2008 Beijing Summer Olympics	2008-05-13	
06	United States	Bridge Breakdown	Demolition of the (1927) Carquinez Bridge in the San Francisco Bay Area	2008-05-15	
07	United States	747 Destruction	Evergreen Air Center storage facility for decommissioned aeroplanes in Marana, Arizona	2008-05-16	
08	China	Shanghai Super Tower	Shanghai World Financial Centre in Shanghai, China	2008-05-20	
09	China	China's Ultimate Port	Yangshan Port in Hangzhou Bay	2008-05-27	
10	United States	Sinking an aircraft carrier	Creating the world's largest artificial reef with USS Oriskany in the Gulf of Mexico off Florida	2008-05-29	
11	Finland	The World's Biggest Cruise Liner	The building of cruise liner MS Freedom of the Seas	2008-06-04	
12	China	Beijing Olympic Stadium	the building of the main stadium for the 2008 Beijing Summer Olympics	2008-08-05	
13	China	World's Biggest Casino	The Venetian Macao, the world's biggest casino in Macau	?	
14	Iceland	Icelandic Super Dam	The building of the Kárahnjúkar Hydropower Plant, Europe's biggest dam in Iceland	?	
15	Germany	Future Trains	Maglev train	?	
16	United Arab Emirates	Building the World	The World (archipelago) of artificial islands in Dubai	?	
17	United States	Train Wreck	the recycling of obsolete train locomotives in the USA	?	
18	China	Building Green Beijing	2010 environmental improvement plan in Beijing, China	?	
19	FranceSwitzerland	Atom Smasher	The Large Hadron Collider at CERN near Geneva, Switzerland	2008-07-31 on NGC (UK & IE)	
20	China	Megabridges: China	Lupu Bridge in Shanghai, Runyang Bridge in Jiangsu Province, and Sutong Bridge near Suzhou	2006-07-11	
21	United States	Ultimate Sub (Super Sub)	USS Texas (Virginia-class submarine) in the U.S. Navy	?	
22	SpainUnited States	Sun Engine	Experimental solar collection farms in Spain and near Las Vegas, Nevada	?	
23	United Kingdom	Super Pipeline	Gas pipeline from Norway to Great Britain	?	
24	United States	Hawaii Superferry	catamaran ferry service between Hawaiian Islands from 2007 to 2009	2007-08-26 on NGC (UK & IE)	
25	United States	Deep Earth Drillers	The world's largest geothermal power complex	2008	
26	Bahrain	World Trade Center Bahrain	World Trade Center (Manama)	2008	
27	United Kingdom	The World's Biggest Shredder	The 560 tonne "fragmentiser" based at Newport Docks.	2008	
28	United States	The Impossible Build	Academy of Sciences, California	2008	

=== Season 5 (2009–2010) ===
#	Country	Title	Subject	Original airdate	Other Airdate	Credits
01	United States	Grand Canyon Skywalk	Grand Canyon Skywalk	2009-02-28 (NGC UK)	2009-04-02	
01	United States	Extreme Helicopter	S-64 Skycrane	2009-06-16		
02	United States	Skyscraper (Ultimate Skyscraper)	Bank of America Tower at One Bryant Park, NYC	2009-10-01		
03	United Kingdom	UK Super Train / Britain's New Railway	High Speed 1	2010-01-08		
04	United States	Electric Ocean / Wave Energy		2010-05-27		
05	?	Secrets of Oscar Tar Bridge		2010-10-09		
06	China	China's Smart Tower		2010-11-26		
07	United States	Future Bridge	Follow the record-breaking effort to rebuild the Minneapolis I-35W bridge in only 17 months, with a focus on its unique engineering	2010		

=== Season 6 (2011) ===
#	Country	Title	Subject	Original airdate	Credits
01	United Arab Emirates	The Leaning Tower of Abu Dhabi	Capital Gate	2010-05-04 on NGC (AU & NZ)	
02	Turkey	Time Bomb Tunnel	Building the Marmaray Tunnel, a 13.5 km (8.4 mi) long undersea railway tunnel in Istanbul, Turkey.	2011-01-29	
03	Singapore	Singapore's Vegas	Building the Marina Bay Sands Resort and Casino in Singapore	2005-10-05 on NGC (AU & NZ)	
04	China	World's Tallest TV Tower	Building one of the world's tallest TV towers, the Guangzhou Sightseeing and TV Tower (now called the Canton Tower	2011-02-11 on 7mate	
05	Taiwan	Ecoark		2011-03-27	
06	South Korea	Korean Superlink	Busan-Geoje Fixed Link	2011-11-17	

=== Unknown season ===
#	Country	Title	Subject	Original airdate
09	Bosnia and Herzegovina	Bridge of Mostar		2004
25	United Kingdom	London Olympic Stadium		2012-05-03
26	United Arab Emirates	World's Tallest Skyscraper	Burj Khalifa	2012-09-17
27	United States	Phantom jet	F-4 jet	?
28	Kazakhstan	Worlds Biggest Tent	Khan Shatyr Entertainment Center	?
33	India	Atmosphere (Kolkata)	Atmosphere - A luxury residential superstructure in Kolkata	2015
30	Malaysia	Second Penang Bridge	The building of the second bridge connecting Peninsular Malaysia to Penang Island spanning a total of 24 km, and 16.9 km of that over water	2014-09-16
31	India	India's Solar Power House	Kamuthi Solar Power Project	?
32	India	Mundra Port	Mundra Port	?

=== Unknown season 2 ===
#	Country	Title	Subject	Original airdate
01	-	"Machines of War": Tanks	History and evolution of the tank	2006-03-08
02	-	"Machines of War": Cruise Missile	The history and development of the cruise missile	2006-03-10
3	?	Science of Steel	The world's metal construction material of choice	2006-03-11
12	-	"Machines of War": Guns	The history and evolution of the gun	2006-03-13
14	-	Science of Brick	The world's oldest man-made building material	2006-03-15
15	3	Science of Concrete	The world's most used building material	2006-03-16

== Spin-offs ==
=== Megastructures: Built from Disaster ===
1. "Megastructures: Built from Disaster – Bridges" // Wednesday, 26 August 2009 8–9pm on Channel 5
2. "Megastructures: Built from Disaster – Ships" // Thursday, 3 September 2009 8–9pm on Channel 5
3. "Megastructures: Built from Disaster – Tunnels" // Thursday, 10 September 2009 8–9pm on Channel 5
4. "Megastructures: Built from Disaster – Stadiums" // Thursday, 24 September 2009 8–9pm on Channel 5
5. "Megastructures: Built from Disaster – Trains" // Thursday, 8 October 2009 8–9pm on Channel 5
6. "Megastructures: Built from Disaster – Skyscrapers" // Thursday, 15 October 2009 8–9pm on Channel 5

=== Ancient Megastructures ===
1. "Ancient Megastructures: The Great Pyramid"
2. "Ancient Megastructures: The Colosseum"
3. "Ancient Megastructures: Chartres Cathedral"
4. "Ancient Megastructures: Istanbuls Hagia Sophia"
5. "Ancient Megastructures: Machu Picchu"
6. "Ancient Megastructures: Angkor Wat"
7. "Ancient Megastructures: Petra Cathedral"
8. "Ancient Megastructures: St Pauls Cathedral"
9. "Ancient Megastructures: The Alhambra"

== International broadcasts ==
In January 2020, Indonesian TV channel, NET interested to broadcasting Megastructures in Indonesia in July 2020.

== See also ==
- Nazi Megastructures
- Monster Moves
- Ultimate Factories
- Mega Builders
