= Richard Lee McNair =

American murderer (born 1958)

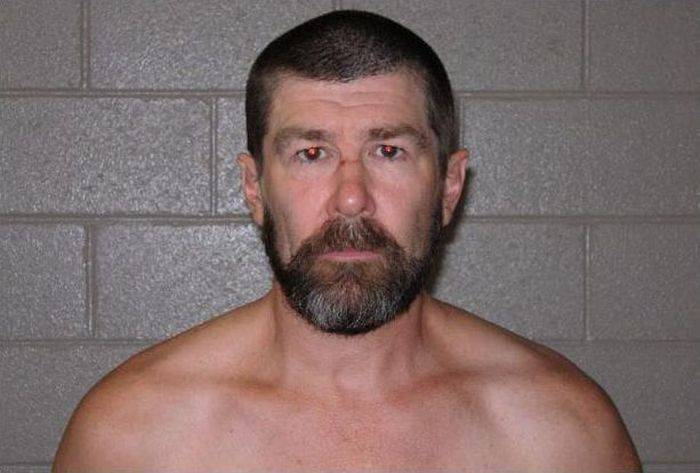
- McNair in 2007
- Born: December 19, 1958 (age 67); Altus, Oklahoma, US
- Status: Incarcerated at USP McCreary (BOP custody, inmate 13829-045)
- Convictions: Murder; Attempted murder Burglary; Attempted escape
- Penalty: Two consecutive life sentences (sentenced by North Dakota)

Details
- Killed: 1
- Injured: 1

Richard Lee McNair (born December 19, 1958) is an American convicted murderer known for his ability to escape and elude capture. In 1987, McNair murdered one man and shot a second man four times during a botched robbery. He is currently serving two terms of life imprisonment for these crimes including escaping from prison.

After McNair's arrest, he escaped three times from three different institutions using various creative methods. On his first attempt, he used lip balm to squeeze out of a pair of handcuffs. He escaped a second time by crawling through a ventilation duct. In his last escape from a federal prison on April 5, 2006, he escaped by concealing himself in a pallet of used postal mailbags and successfully convinced a police officer he was not the prison escapee but actually a jogger. This resulted in his mugshot being featured a dozen times on the TV show America's Most Wanted, and made him one of the top fifteen fugitives wanted by US Marshals. McNair traveled to Canada twice in order to evade capture, traveling across the country for over a year before being apprehended in a random police check on October 25, 2007. Much of what the public knows about McNair's escape and his time as a fugitive is through McNair's prison correspondence with a Canadian journalist, Byron Christopher.

== Early life ==
McNair had previously been a military police sergeant at Minot Air Force Base and an informant for the Minot Police Department. He was removed from his position and demoted over a suspected theft.

== Overview ==
On November 17, 1987, while attempting a burglary in Minot, North Dakota, McNair was surprised by two men and murdered one of them. McNair's murder of Jerry Thies occurred at a grain elevator operated by the Farmers Union Elevator Co. while McNair was a sergeant posted at the nearby Minot Air Force Base. A second man was shot four times, but survived.

McNair remained at large until February 1988, when the police called him in for questioning. McNair then surrendered a concealed handgun. It was then that McNair's first escape attempt occurred, at the Minot municipal police station. McNair's first period as a fugitive lasted only a few hours, after which McNair was quickly recaptured. After his initial arrest, McNair was handcuffed to a chair and left in a room with three detectives. McNair used lip balm, which he had in his pocket, as a lubricant to squeeze his hands free from the handcuffs. McNair then led police on a chase on foot through the town, eventually being chased up a three-flight stairway in an effort to evade capture. After becoming surrounded by police on the roof of a three-story building downtown, McNair attempted to jump to a tree branch to escape arrest, but the branch broke. McNair landed on the ground and hurt his back, after which he was easily apprehended. After McNair was released from the hospital, he was moved to the Ward County Jail in Minot. That same month, sheriff's deputies discovered another escape attempt when, after moving McNair to another cell, they found two cinder blocks partially chiseled out from the cell in which he was being held.

McNair was later sentenced to two life sentences for murder and attempted murder, and a thirty-year prison sentence for burglary.

On October 9, 1992, McNair escaped with two other prisoners from the North Dakota State Penitentiary in Bismarck, North Dakota, by crawling through a ventilation duct. One of the prisoners who escaped with McNair was apprehended within hours, and the other within days. After his escape, McNair grew out his hair and dyed it blonde in an attempt to disguise himself. Much of his time on the run was spent roaming the United States in stolen cars. McNair remained free for ten months, until he was eventually arrested in Grand Island, Nebraska, on July 5, 1993.

After his second recapture, the North Dakota Department of Corrections deemed McNair a problem inmate, and arranged his transfer through the Interstate Compact to Minnesota Correctional Facility – Oak Park Heights. After a number of years at this facility, and realizing he would not be able to escape, McNair participated in a sit-down strike that caused his return to North Dakota, and his later transfer to the Federal Bureau of Prisons. He was assigned to the maximum security United States Penitentiary, Florence High which is next to – but distinct from – ADX Florence. Again realizing that escape would be unlikely, he arranged a transfer to United States Penitentiary, Pollock on the grounds that this was marginally closer to his parents' home in Oklahoma.

=== 2006 prison escape ===
On April 5, 2006, McNair escaped from the United States Penitentiary in Pollock, Louisiana. McNair's duties in prison included work in a manufacturing area, where he would repair old, torn mailbags. He held this position for several months, throughout which McNair plotted his escape. McNair escaped by hiding himself in a specially constructed "escape pod" (which included a breathing tube), which was buried under a pile of mailbags. The pallet was shrink-wrapped and forklifted to a nearby warehouse outside of the prison fence. After prison staff delivered McNair's pallet and went for lunch, McNair cut himself out of his "escape pod" and walked through the unsecured area to freedom. Federal investigators believed that McNair must have received help from other inmates to escape, but McNair has always maintained that he acted alone.

McNair's pallet was shipped out of the prison around 9:45am, and he was able to exit the pallet around 11:00am. McNair was aware that it would not be until 4:00pm that the prison would find him missing. McNair's plan was to go to the nearby town of Alexandria, Louisiana, where he would then steal supplies and transportation.

Hours after his escape from Pollock, McNair was stopped while running away on a railroad track near Ball, Louisiana, by police officer Carl Bordelon. This incident was captured on a video camera mounted in Bordelon's patrol car. McNair had no identification and proceeded to give Officer Bordelon the alias of Robert Jones. When asked again five minutes later, he gave a different alias, Jimmy Jones, though the officer did not notice the different answer. McNair laughed and joked with the officer, and even as the officer got a matching description of the inmate, McNair appeared collected and calm. He successfully convinced Bordelon that he was jogging and in town to help on a post-Katrina roofing project, allowing him to go back to "jogging" within 10 minutes.

One factor that made it easier for McNair to escape arrest was that the photo provided to police was very low-quality and six months old. Another was that the prison had told police that they were not completely sure that McNair had escaped. Bordelon himself claimed that he let McNair go because the physical description of McNair given to police was completely different from how McNair actually appeared. Over the ten minutes that Bordelon questioned McNair, McNair remained calm and provided completely plausible explanations, eventually convincing Bordelon that his alibi was true.

McNair later wrote that he did not see the cruiser because it was blocked from view by trees, and that he planned to run if he was not able to convince Bordelon of his "innocence". McNair later denied the suggestion that he would have assaulted the police officer if confronted, claiming that he had renounced violence after his initial arrest. McNair described his escape as a "get out of jail free card", and described his feelings after the confrontation with Bordelon as "relief, disbelief, bewilderment." McNair agreed that he did not resemble his prison picture.

Bordelon remained with the Ball Police department for the rest of his life, eventually becoming assistant police chief before his death in 2015 at the age of 51.

=== Fugitive in Canada ===
On April 13, 2006, US Marshals added McNair to their 15 Most Wanted list. They noted that McNair was the first prisoner to escape from a federal prison since 1991.

Later that April, about two weeks after his escape, McNair successfully crossed into British Columbia from Blaine, Washington. On April 28, 2006, RCMP in Penticton, British Columbia, confronted McNair while investigating a stolen car that he was driving, which was parked at a local beach. The officers asked McNair to step out of the car to be questioned, which he did, but he ran across a nearby field and outran the officers soon after being confronted. The police impounded the car, but did not realize the identity of McNair until two days later, when one of the officers recognized him from an episode of America's Most Wanted. Subsequent investigation found a digital camera full of self-portraits, which police determined were probably for the purpose of producing a fake ID. When authorities examined the car, they found McNair's fingerprints, confirming that he was in Canada.

After escaping arrest in Penticton, McNair rode a bike to Kelowna. Because it took several days for the police to confirm his identity, it was relatively easy for McNair to escape the area. In May 2006, McNair traveled back to the United States, when he drove a Subaru Outback from Vernon, British Columbia, to Blaine, Washington. McNair then traveled across the United States and eventually crossed back into Canada from Minnesota. After arriving back in Canada, McNair traveled through southern Ontario, then traveled west, to Vancouver.

Early on, McNair developed a plan to buy land in central British Columbia, around Williston Lake, after seeing ads for the property. He changed his mind after visiting the area and finding that a drought and pine beetle infestation had devastated the area. The fact that there was only one road in and out of the property also made McNair uncomfortable.

In 2007, McNair travelled to eastern Canada. He drove through the Laurentian Highlands in Quebec, where he enjoyed mountain biking. He spent a lot of time around Lac Saint-Jean. McNair nearly attempted to cross back into the United States again at Derby Line, Vermont, but the high security on the American side convinced him that attempting to cross back would be too risky. He eventually travelled through Halifax, Nova Scotia, and Saint John, New Brunswick. McNair spent about two months in Fredericton, New Brunswick, before he was again confronted by police.

=== Attempts to avoid recapture ===
On April 8, 2006, three days after McNair's escape, America's Most Wanted ran its first profile of McNair. The program would go on to detail McNair a total of twelve times on television, and nine times on radio. The last time McNair was featured was on November 24, 2007, a month after his recapture. Over the period of McNair's time in Canada, Canadian viewers made over 50 reports to the Royal Canadian Mounted Police (RCMP), confirming that the fugitive had been seen north of the border.

McNair watched America's Most Wanted intently, describing the show as a "thorn". McNair confirmed after his capture that whenever a new episode of America's Most Wanted aired, he would buy food and fuel his vehicle, "then if featured would keep it low for a couple of days."

Throughout his time as a fugitive, McNair tracked his own story on the internet. After his recapture, McNair commented that the ongoing coverage of him was "for the most part true". It is not true that United States Marshal Glenn Belgard attempted to capture McNair online with the help of a criminal profiler. However, Belgard worked closely with United States law enforcement agencies and television networks as well as the Canadian equivalents to keep pressure on the fugitive. McNair suspected that the Louisiana police had attempted to contact him by posing as a woman online, who said that "she would like to hide [McNair] in her basement." McNair was surprised by how much the media coverage focused on him, especially the eleven-page article that appeared in The New Yorker, written by Mark Singer, on October 9, 2006.

McNair owned several laptops while living as a fugitive. After having his laptop seized in Penticton, he began to store most of his information on USB sticks. With the help of a scanner, digital camera, Photoshop, and a pet ID website, McNair was able to produce a passable fake Alaska driver's license. He learned how to rig his video camera to his laptop so that he could cut his own hair. One of McNair's laptops was dedicated solely to monitoring a Louisiana-based website which closely followed all media coverage of McNair.

In order to support himself, McNair stole vehicles and cash from car dealerships. Because he had once worked as a car salesman himself, McNair knew where to find cash and keys at such dealerships, and how to avoid security. McNair stole only new vehicles since they had window stickers indicating whether a vehicle was equipped with a GPS-style tracking system (if it was, he wouldn't touch it). McNair avoided driving conspicuous-looking vehicles, preferring white vehicles that "everybody has". He once considered stealing a 3/4 ton truck/camper, "but one of the supposed sightings of [McNair] was in North Dakota (of all places) in a truck with camper", so he eventually settled on a van instead.

In one incident, while McNair was staying in a motel near Chilliwack, British Columbia, he left to buy something and returned to find the motel surrounded by a police SWAT team. McNair began to flee in his car, but later found on a local AM radio station that the police were responding to a hostage situation at the motel. McNair then returned to the scene and filmed the standoff with a Sony HD video camera which he had recently purchased. The episode lasted for another twenty minutes.

=== Recapture ===
On October 24, 2007, near Nash Creek, New Brunswick, off-duty RCMP constable Dan Melanson spotted an expensive-looking white cube van with "crappy looking" tinted rear windows and an Ontario license plate. Suspecting that the van was stolen, and/or being used to smuggle alcohol or cigarettes, Melanson noted the plate number and that the van was headed to Campbellton, a nearby city. Melanson did not attempt to apprehend McNair, but his report alerted other RCMP in Campbellton of the presence of McNair's vehicle. (McNair had in fact tinted the windows himself in a London, Ontario park.)

The next day, Constable Stephane Gagnon, a six-week rookie, spotted McNair's van by chance in downtown Campbellton, and pursued it. Following a low-speed car chase and a subsequent foot chase, McNair was successfully arrested by Gagnon with the help of his field coach, Constable Nelson Lévesque. In October 2008, the US-based International Association of Chiefs of Police awarded Melanson the Looking Beyond the Licence Plate Grand Prize for his role in apprehending McNair. McNair himself described his capture as simply the product of bad luck: as he put it, it was "just one of those days." McNair was transferred to the Atlantic Institution, a Canadian federal maximum security penitentiary in Renous, New Brunswick, while awaiting extradition to the United States.

Mounties later told the media that McNair was cooperative after his capture, and even joked with them. When one officer asked McNair what the reward was for his capture, McNair replied "$25,000." "That's not much," said the officer. McNair replied that was because "all of the government money is tied up in Osama bin Laden's reward." McNair later described the Campbellton RCMP as "good men doing their job."

== Subsequent incarceration ==
=== Prison ===
McNair (Federal Bureau of Prisons ID # 13829-045) is incarcerated at United States Penitentiary, McCreary in Kentucky. Prior to his November 2022 transfer he was at ADX Florence and prior to his October 23, 2023, transfer was at USP Florence-High; both are maximum-security prisons near Florence, Colorado. For eleven days, he was at the Federal Transfer Center, Oklahoma City.

During his time at ADX Florence, McNair described his location as the "most secure section of the most secure prison in the world", but expressed reservations about discussing specific details of his incarceration. "Thank God for prisons," McNair wrote. "There are some very sick people in here... Animals you would never want living near your family or the public in general. I don't know how corrections staff deal with it. They get spit on, shit on, abused, and I have seen them risk their own lives and save a prisoner many times."

=== Media correspondence ===
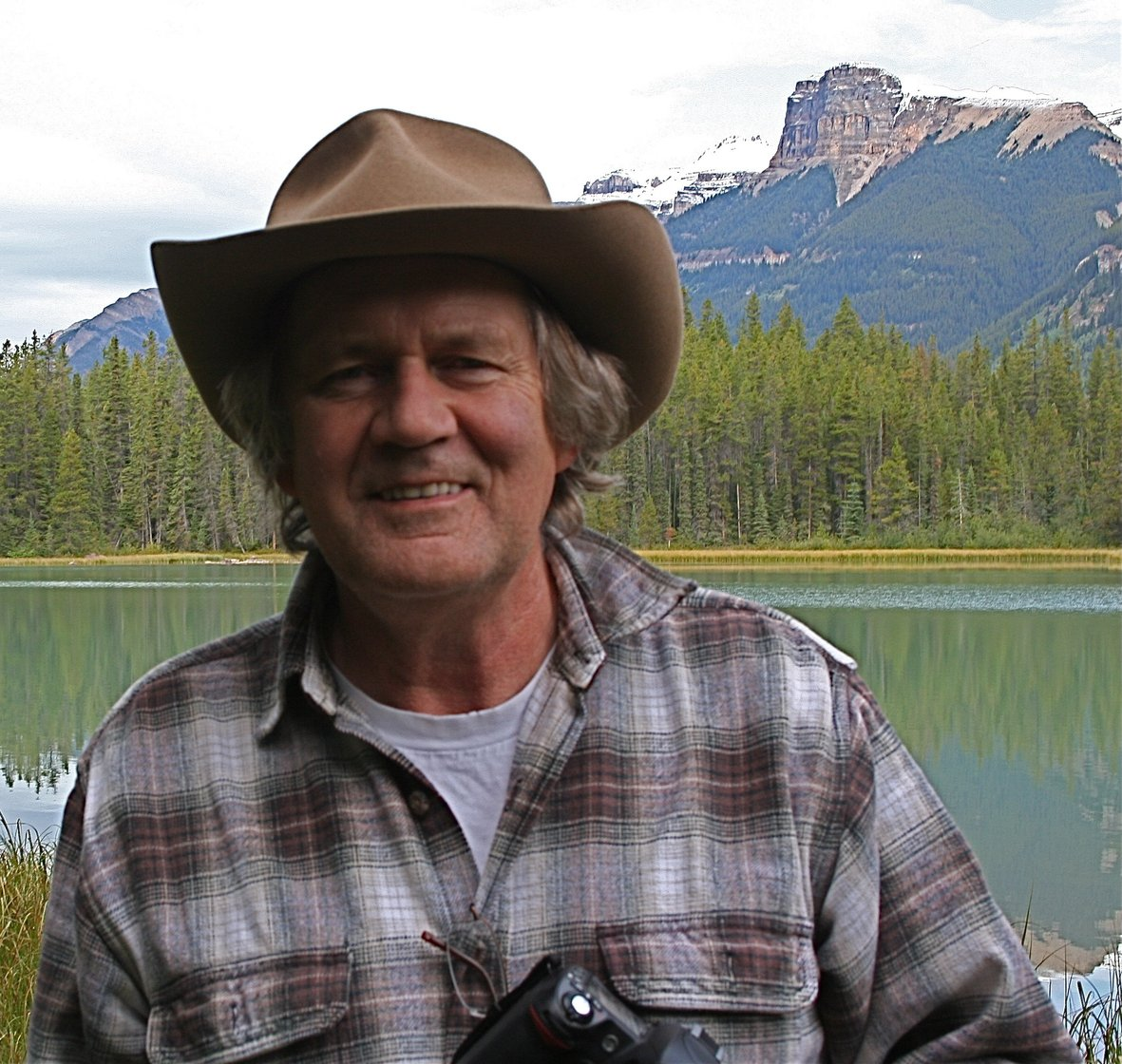
Much of what the public knows about Richard McNair is through his correspondence with Byron Christopher, a Canadian journalist.

In 2008, Byron Christopher, a crime reporter from the same New Brunswick town where McNair was captured, initiated a correspondence with McNair via mail. In his first letter, Christopher included a picture that he had taken of the town, taken near the place that McNair was arrested. He told McNair that he hoped the Campbellton Chamber of Commerce would write a check to McNair for all the publicity he had brought to the town, and wrote to McNair about the recent World Series and federal election. Christopher included three American dollars in order to cover the cost of paper and postage. The prison returned his money.

When McNair wrote back to Christopher, it was his first response to the media. The letter revealed many personal details about McNair's most recent escape which had previously been unknown. Revealing that he had spent time hiding in Fredericton, New Brunswick, McNair described Fredericton's residents as "very friendly and well educated." He revealed that his favorite serial was the Christian Science Monitor. Campbellton's local newspaper, The Tribune, covered the correspondence in detail.

In subsequent letters to Christopher, McNair revealed details about his escape and travels through Canada, providing most of what the public knows about McNair's time as a fugitive. McNair had an interest in discussing his story with a British TV reporter, but suspects that the correspondence may have been terminated by prison censors.

Christopher later compiled his correspondence, conducted additional research on the story, and eventually produced a book on McNair, The Man Who Mailed Himself Out of Jail. The book is a follow-up to "The Running Man" series, published by The Tribune newspaper of Campbellton, New Brunswick, in 2009.

== Pop culture ==
A documentary series called the prison breaker is about Christopher and his escape

Richard Lee McNair was profiled on the show America’s Most Wanted twelve times. Richard Lee McNair was featured on Unsolved Mysteries Season 5, Episode 9

== Resources ==
- Video of McNair CIA smooth-talking a police officer
- Criminal history
- McNair's U.S. Marshals Service wanted poster
- Calgary Herald, October 10, 2007. "U.S. killer may be on loose in Calgary" by Sherri Zickefoose, Calgary Herald.
- The New Yorker, October 9, 2006. "Escaped" (essay by Mark Singer).
- The Calgary Herald (Alberta) August 14, 2006. "RCMP sift through fresh tips after TV show on escaped killer: No confirmed sightings reported since end of April".
- The Vancouver Sun (British Columbia), August 5, 2006. "U.S. fugitive in Canada is focus of TV show".
- Daily Town Talk (Alexandria, Louisiana), July 11, 2006. "On the lam: McNair's continental adventure".
