= Byron Christopher =

Canadian news reporter

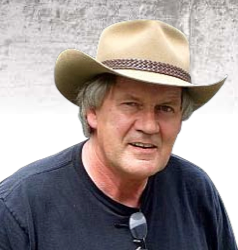
- Christopher in 2011
- Born: May 1, 1949 (age 77); Campbellton, New Brunswick, Canada
- Occupations: Journalist, author

Byron Christopher (born May 1, 1949) is a Canadian news reporter from Campbellton, New Brunswick. His style of work has been self referred to as "Armageddon-like blood-and-guts crime reporting".

Christopher has filed stories across North America, Europe, Asia and Australia, with most of his journalistic career focused on Western Canada, often reporting on criminal justice. During the two decades that he worked for The Canadian Broadcasting Corporation and for 630 CHED, he won national awards for both his print and radio journalism. He is known for his ability to secure exclusive interviews with convicted criminals, and is sometimes the only media source that high-profile criminals will contact. His investigation into alleged illegal activity by Calgary-based Talisman Energy was reported worldwide, and eventually forced the company to suspend its operations in Sudan.

== Biography ==
=== Early life ===
Christopher was born in Campbellton, New Brunswick, Canada. He began his broadcasting career in 1965, working as a sports reader for a local radio station, CKNB, while he was attending high school in Campbellton. After graduating in 1967, Christopher worked for a year and a half as a disc jockey at CKMR Radio in Newcastle, New Brunswick. After working with CKMR, Christopher was hired to work as a DJ at CFOM Radio in Quebec City. Christopher later commented that he was surprised to have been hired to work in Quebec, "since [his] French vocabulary at the time consisted [only] of the word 'Chevrolet'".

After working in Quebec, Christopher worked as a radio and television news announcer in Dawson Creek, British Columbia. In 1970 Christopher moved to South Australia, where he worked for two Australian media outlets, Radio 5AU and GTS Television. Christopher returned to Canada in 1972, and has since pursued news assignments in the United States, Poland, Germany, Austria, England, Scotland, Wales, Nepal, and Nicaragua. Most of his subsequent reporting has been focused on Western Canada.

=== Work with the CBC ===
Christopher worked from 1981 to 1995 for CBC Radio News and CBC Radio Current Affairs, in Edmonton, Alberta. Over the course of his first decade in Edmonton, Christopher established himself as a criminal justice reporter, and for working with subjects convicted of serious crimes. Throughout his career, Christopher has had exclusive interviews with many locally and nationally well-known criminals, including Michael White, Colin Thatcher, Wiebo Ludwig, Leo Teskey, Anton Rapati, and Karl Toft.

In 1984 Christopher was one of the first reporters to investigate a small commuter plane crash in northern Alberta, in which six people were killed. By developing a rapport with survivors and local residents he was one of the few investigating reporters present to succeed in interviewing those related to the incident. He was later interviewed as a primary source for author Carol Shaben's book on the crash, Into the Abyss.

In 1991 Christopher received a national award from the Canadian Association of Journalists for "outstanding investigative journalism", recognizing his work uncovering new details concerning a double homicide in Saskatchewan. In 1992 Christopher became the first reporter to interview David Milgaard when Milgaard was released from prison after serving twenty-two years for a wrongful murder conviction. Christopher's interview with Milgaard was the inspiration for the line "and a late-breaking story on the CBC" in the song "Wheat Kings" by The Tragically Hip. After leaving the CBC, Christopher taught journalism briefly at Grant MacEwan Community College. In 1997 Christopher accompanied a group of four First Nations students from Grant MacEwan on a fact-finding tour of Germany and Austria, meeting with local groups interested in the culture of North American Native peoples.

=== Work with 630 CHED ===
From 1996 to 2008 Christopher worked as a news reporter for CHED, an Edmonton-based talk radio station. In 2001 he taught a course in journalism at the Northern Alberta Institute of Technology, and in the same year wrote a story for the Pakistan News Service about how the War in Afghanistan was perceived by the Canadian news community. He deferred his payment for the story to "a needy Pakistani journalism student".

In 2002 Christopher discovered that a Calgary-based oil company, Talisman Energy, had been accused of complicity in the rape, bombing, kidnapping, enslavement, and execution of local people while operating in South Sudan. Talisman executives made it clear that they were uncomfortable with Christopher investigating the story, and sent a letter to CHED threatening to sue the company for libel if the story was ever reported. After Christopher filed the story the station refused to report it. Christopher attempted to have the story carried by other local media companies, including Global TV and The Edmonton Journal; they refused to run the story.

After being rejected by a number of local media companies, Christopher succeeded in having his Talisman story published by a small online magazine that specializes in publishing un- and under-reported news stories, rabble.ca. About a week later Christopher's article on Rabble was noticed by the Financial Times of London. After the Financial Times ran the Tailsman story, it was noticed by other news services and was circulated globally via the Associated Press, Canadian Press, and Reuters. The negative publicity caused by Christopher's article forced Talisman to suspend its operations in Sudan within about a year, but local media never carried the article.

In 2007 Christopher spoke on a panel to a group of international journalists in Toronto on the subject of how to respond when targeted by police search warrants. He once joked with an interviewer about his having been subject to half-a-dozen search warrants, "more than the average drug-dealer in Detroit". Christopher left 630 CHED in 2008, and is now working as a freelance journalist in Edmonton.

=== Correspondence with Richard Lee McNair ===
Richard Lee McNair is a convicted American murderer, serving a life sentence for a homicide that he committed in 1987. He has escaped from a number of prisons over the period of his incarceration; and, after his second recapture in 1993, McNair was deemed problematic and transferred to a federal prison near Pollock, Louisiana. In 2006 McNair successfully shipped himself out of prison, convinced a police officer searching for him that he was a roofer working in the area, and escaped to Canada. McNair lived as a fugitive in Canada for over a year, travelling across the country before being apprehended in Christopher's hometown of Campbellton.

In 2008 Christopher began a correspondence with McNair via mail. In his first letter, Christopher included a picture that he had taken of the town, taken near the place that McNair was arrested. He told McNair that he hoped the Campbellton Chamber of Commerce would write a cheque to McNair for all the publicity he had brought to the town, and wrote to McNair about the recent World Series and federal election. Christopher included three American dollars in order to cover the cost of paper and postage; the prison returned his money.

When McNair wrote back to Christopher, it was his first response to the media. The letter revealed many personal details about McNair's most recent escape which had previously been unknown. Campbellton's local newspaper, The Tribune, covered their continuing correspondence in detail, publishing Christopher's award-winning series of articles on McNair under the title "The Running Man". In subsequent letters to Christopher, McNair revealed details about his escape and travels through Canada, providing most of what the public knows about McNair's time as a fugitive.

Christopher compiled his correspondence, conducted additional research on the story, and eventually produced a book on McNair, The Man Who Mailed Himself Out of Jail. It was released via Amazon.com on June 20, 2013.

== Articles by Christopher ==
- Christopher, Byron. "Gretzky: Biggest Thrill of his Career". The Canadian Broadcasting Corporation. May 19, 1984. Retrieved July 22, 2012.
- Christopher, Byron. "Colin Thatcher: How I Was Framed: After Serving 22 Years for the Murder of his Ex-wife, the Former Cabinet Minister Breaks His Silence". Maclean's. August 26, 2009. Retrieved July 21, 2012.
- Christopher, Byron. "Maclean’s Interview: Wiebo Ludwig: FROM THE ARCHIVES: Anti-oil Patch Activist on His Arrest, the ‘Very Humane’ Search of His Property, and the EnCana Pipeline Bombings". Maclean's. January 20, 2010. Retrieved July 22, 2012.
- Christopher, Byron. "Civil Suit | Civil War". Rabble.ca. March 19, 2002. Retrieved July 22, 2012.
- Christopher, Byron. "The ABCs of Unbiased News Coverage". Rabble.ca. November 12, 2001. Retrieved July 22, 2012.
- Christopher, Byron. "The Mind of the Beast: Infamous Pedophile Karl Toft Tells How He Groomed His Victims". Sun Media. May 20, 2008. Retrieved July 21, 2012.
- Christopher, Byron. "Wiebo’s Final Battle". The Dominion. March 16, 2012. Retrieved July 22, 2012.

== Bibliography ==
- "The Man Who Mailed Himself Out Of Jail [Kindle Edition]" Amazon.ca. 2013. Retrieved June 23, 2013.
- "Richard Lee McNair". America's Most Wanted. September 18, 2008. Retrieved September 22, 2011. Retrieved July 21, 2012.
- Atlantic Community Newspapers Association. "Best Feature Series Winner: Byron Christopher; Campbellton Tribune". 2010 Better Newspapers Competition. May 2010. Retrieved July 21, 2012.
- Bayens, Stuart P. "Richard Lee McNair". Last Link on the Left. May 15, 2009. Retrieved July 21, 2012.
- Bayens, Stuart P. "Thomas George Svekla – Trial – 3". Last Link on the Left. April 30, 2008. Retrieved July 21, 2012.
- Bayens, Stuart P. "Who is That Man?". Last Link on the Left. January 12, 2009. Retrieved July 21, 2012.
- "Mounties Capture 'Most Wanted' Killer in N.B.". CBC News. October 26, 2007. Retrieved July 21, 2012.
- Ende, Margi. "Left behind: Rabble and Its Struggle to Stay Afloat - and out of the Mainstream". Ryerson Review of Journalism. March 2004. Retrieved July 21, 2012.
- NAITline. Vol.20, No.8. Edmonton, Alberta. March 2001.
- McNally, Trevor. "Former CKNB Sports Reader is Now Veteran Crime Reporter" The Tribune. Campbellton, NB. October 10, 2007. Retrieved July 21, 2012.
- Shaben, Carol. Into the Abyss: How a Deadly Plane Crash Changed the Lives of a Pilot, a Politician, a Criminal and a Cop. Canada: Random House. October 2012.
- Sweetgrass Staff. "Students on Speaking Tour". Alberta Sweetgrass. Vol.4, Iss.6. 1997. Retrieved July 23, 2012.
