= Federal Transfer Center, Oklahoma City =

Federal prison in Oklahoma City, Oklahoma, United States

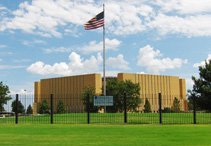
- Interactive map of Federal Transfer Center, Oklahoma City
- Location: Oklahoma City, Oklahoma, U.S.; 35°23′27″N 97°36′59″W
- Status: Operational
- Security class: Administrative facility
- Population: 1,226
- Opened: 1995
- Managed by: Federal Bureau of Prisons

The Federal Transfer Center (FTC Oklahoma City) is a United States federal prison for male and female inmates in Oklahoma City, Oklahoma. It is operated by the Federal Bureau of Prisons, a division of the United States Department of Justice, and houses offenders and parole violators who have yet to be assigned to a permanent prison facility.

FTC Oklahoma City is located adjacent to the Will Rogers World Airport, and serves as the main hub of the Justice Prisoner Air Transportation System, popularly known as Con Air. A cadre of low-security inmates are assigned to FTC Oklahoma City to perform food service and maintenance duties.

Piper Kerman, author of Orange Is the New Black stated that circa 2005 the women's section was "spotlessly clean" and "subdued".

== Notable inmates (current and former) ==
Inmate name	Register number	Photo	Status	Details
Derek Chauvin	47849-509		Transferred to FCI Big Spring. Serving a 21-year federal sentence; scheduled for release on November 18, 2037.	Former Minneapolis police officer convicted in Minnesota of the murder of George Floyd, for which he was sentenced to 22.5 years in state prison. He is serving a concurrent 21-year federal sentence for violating Floyd's civil rights.
Richard McNair	13829-045		Transferred to USP McCreary. Serving two consecutive life sentences on a state murder charge from North Dakota in 1987.	Previously held at ADX Florence due to multiple prison escapes until November 2022 and USP Florence High until October 23, 2023; escaped from the Ward County Jail in Minot, North Dakota in 1987, from the North Dakota State Penitentiary in Bismarck in 1992, and from USP Pollock in Louisiana in 2006.
Jared Fogle	12919-028		Transferred to FCI Englewood. Scheduled for release on March 24, 2029.	Former spokesperson for Subway sandwich restaurants; pleaded guilty in 2015 to traveling across state lines to engage in illicit sexual conduct with minors and receiving child sexual abuse materials. Entered the prison on December 15, 2015, after being sentenced before being transferred to FCI Englewood.
Joshua Duggar	42501-509		Transferred to FCI Elkton. Scheduled for release on February 2, 2033.	Former lobbyist and reality television personality from the TLC series 19 Kids and Counting. He was found guilty of receiving and possessing child sexual abuse materials, and sentenced for receipt of said materials.

== See also ==
- List of United States federal prisons
- Federal Bureau of Prisons
- Incarceration in the United States
