= List of law enforcement agencies in North Dakota =

This is a list of law enforcement agencies in the state of North Dakota.

According to the US Bureau of Justice Statistics' 2008 Census of State and Local Law Enforcement Agencies, the state had 114 law enforcement agencies employing 1,324 sworn officers, about 206 for each 100,000 residents.

== State agencies ==
- North Dakota Bureau of Criminal Investigation
- North Dakota Department of Corrections and Rehabilitation
- North Dakota Game and Fish Department
- North Dakota Highway Patrol
- North Dakota State Fire Marshal
- North Dakota Parks and Recreation Department

== County agencies ==
- Adams County Sheriff's Office
- Barnes County Sheriff's Office
- Benson County Sheriff's Office
- Billings County Sheriff's Office
- Bottineau County Sheriff's Office
- Bowman County Sheriff's Office
- Burke County Sheriff's Office
- Burleigh County Sheriff's Office
- Cass County Sheriff's Office
- Cavalier County Sheriff's Office
- Dickey County Sheriff's Office
- Divide County Sheriff's Office
- Dunn County Sheriff's Office
- Eddy County Sheriff's Office
- Emmons County Sheriff's Office
- Foster County Sheriff's Office
- Golden Valley County Sheriff's Office
- Grand Forks County Sheriff's Office
- Grant County Sheriff's Office
- Griggs County Sheriff's Office
- Hettinger County Sheriff's Office
- Kidder County Sheriff's Office
- Lamoure County Sheriff's Office
- Logan County Sheriff's Office
- McHenry County Sheriff's Office
- McIntosh County Sheriff's Office
- McKenzie County Sheriff's Office
- McLean County Sheriff's Office
- Mercer County Sheriff's Office
- Morton County Sheriff's Office
- Mountrail County Sheriff's Office
- Nelson County Sheriff's Office
- Oliver County Sheriff's Office
- Pembina County Sheriff's Office
- Pierce County Sheriff's Office
- Ramsey County Sheriff's Office
- Ransom County Sheriff's Office
- Renville County Sheriff's Office
- Richland County Sheriff's Office
- Rolette County Sheriff's Office
- Sargent County Sheriff's Office
- Sheridan County Sheriff's Office
- Sioux County Sheriff's Office
- Slope County Sheriff's Office
- Stark County Sheriff's Office
- Steele County Sheriff's Office
- Stutsman County Sheriff's Office
- Towner County Sheriff's Office
- Traill County Sheriff's Office
- Walsh County Sheriff's Office
- Ward County Sheriff's Office
- Wells County Sheriff's Office
- Williams County Sheriff's Office

== City agencies ==
- Ashley Police Department
- Belfield Police Department
- Beulah Police Department
- Bismarck Police Department
- Bowman Police Department
- Burlington Police Department
- Cando Police Department
- Carrington Police Department
- Casselton Police Department
- Cavalier Police Department
- Center Police Department
- Cooperstown Police Department
- Crosby Police Department
- Devils Lake Police Department
- Dickinson Police Department
- Elgin Police Department
- Ellendale Police Department
- Emerado Police Department
- Fargo Police Department
- Fessenden Police Department
- Grafton Police Department
- Grand Forks Police Department
- Harvey Police Department
- Hazen Police Department
- Hillsboro Police Department
- Jamestown Police Department
- Kenmare Police Department
- Killdeer Police Department
- Kulm Police Department
- Lamoure Police Department
- Larimore Police Department
- Lincoln Police Department
- Linton Police Department
- Lisbon Police Department
- Mandan Police Department
- Mayville Police Department
- Medora Police Department
- Milnor Police Department
- Minot Police Department
- Mohall Police Department
- Napoleon Police Department
- New Town Police Department
- Northwood Police Department
- Oakes Police Department
- Parshall Police Department
- Powers Lake Police Department
- Rolla Police Department
- Rugby Police Department
- St. John Police Department
- Scranton Police Department
- Sherwood Police Department
- South Heart Police Department
- Stanley Police Department
- Steele Police Department
- Surrey Police Department
- Tioga Police Department
- Thompson Police Department
- Valley City Police Department
- Wahpeton Police Department
- Watford City Police Department
- West Fargo Police Department
- Williston Police Department
- Wishek Police Department

== Tribal agencies ==
- Sisseton-Wahpeton Police
- Three Affiliated Tribes Law Enforcement Services
- Turtle Mountain Band of Chippewa Indians Police Department

== College and university agencies ==
- University of North Dakota Police Department
- North Dakota State University Police Department
- North Dakota State College of Science Police

== Cross-jurisdiction agencies ==
- South East Multi-County Agency Narcotics Task Force (SEMCA)
