= DLNR =

DLNR may refer to:

- Hawaii Department of Land and Natural Resources
- Donetsk People's Republic and Luhansk People's Republic, collectively, two occupied territories of Ukraine
