= List of state and territorial fish and wildlife management agencies in the United States =

This article is a list of state and territorial fish and wildlife management agencies in the United States, by U.S. state or territory. These agencies are typically within each state's Executive Branch, and have the purpose of protecting a state's fish and wildlife resources. The exact duties of each agency vary by state, but often include resource management and research, regulation setting, and enforcement of law related to fisheries and wildlife.

== Alabama ==
- Alabama Department of Conservation and Natural Resources

== Alaska ==
- Alaska Department of Fish and Game
- Alaska Wildlife Troopers

The Alaska State Troopers, officially the Division of Alaska State Troopers (AST), is the state police agency of the U.S. state of Alaska. It is a division of the Alaska Department of Public Safety (DPS). The AST is a full-service law enforcement agency that handles both traffic and criminal law enforcement. The AST is also involved in apprehending fugitives as part of the Alaska Fugitive Task Force, an inter-agency collaborative of Alaska police departments that cooperates with police agencies throughout the United States and less commonly with Interpol in apprehending wanted men and women. Unlike many lower 48 states, the AST also serves as Alaska’s primary environmental law enforcement agency; troopers assigned to the AST’s Division of Alaska Wildlife Troopers are known as "Alaska Wildlife Troopers" and primarily serve as game wardens, although they retain the same powers as other Alaskan state troopers.

== Arizona ==
- Arizona Game and Fish Department

== Arkansas ==
- Arkansas Game and Fish Commission

== California ==
- California Natural Resources Agency
  - California Department of Fish and Wildlife
- California State Parks
  - State Parks Peace Officers

== Colorado ==
- Colorado Department of Natural Resources
  - Colorado Parks and Wildlife

== Connecticut ==
- Connecticut Department of Energy and Environmental Protection

== Delaware ==
- Delaware Department of Natural Resources and Environmental Control

== District of Columbia ==
- Department of Energy and Environment Department of Energy and Environment (DOEE) - formerly the District Department of the Environment

== Florida ==
- Florida Fish and Wildlife Conservation Commission

== Georgia ==
- Georgia Department of Natural Resources

== Hawaii ==
- Hawaii Department of Land and Natural Resources
- Hawaii Division of Conservation and Resource Enforcement#'''Hawaii DLNR Police'''

== Idaho ==
- Idaho Department of Fish and Game

== Illinois ==
- Illinois Department of Natural Resources

== Indiana ==
- Indiana Department of Natural Resources

== Iowa ==
- Iowa Department of Natural Resources

== Kansas ==
- Kansas Department of Wildlife, Parks and Tourism

== Kentucky ==
- Kentucky Department of Fish and Wildlife Resources

== Louisiana ==
- Louisiana Department of Wildlife and Fisheries

== Maine ==
- Maine Department of Inland Fisheries and Wildlife
  - Bureau of Resource Management, provides management and research resources for Maine's freshwater fisheries and wildlife.
  - Bureau of Warden Service, enforces and conducts investigations relating to fisheries, wildlife, and off-road recreation laws.
- Maine Department of Marine Resources, researches, manages, and conserves the natural resources found in the tidal waters of the state.
  - Bureau of Marine Science, conducts research and monitoring and provides management resources for the state's marine fisheries.
  - Bureau of Public Health and Aquaculture, oversees shellfish harvest and aquaculture operations to ensure public health.
  - Bureau of Sea Run Fisheries and Habitat, works to manage, protect and restore diadromous fish populations.
  - Bureau of Marine Patrol, enforces state and federal marine fisheries laws.
  - Shellfish Conservation Wardens are municipal enforcement agents who undergo training with the Department of Marine Resources, regarding enforcement of municipal and state shellfish harvest ordinances.

== Maryland ==
- Maryland Department of Natural Resources

== Massachusetts ==
- Massachusetts Executive Office of Energy and Environmental Affairs (EOEEA)
  - Massachusetts Department of Fish and Game
  - Massachusetts Environmental Police

== Michigan ==
- Michigan Department of Natural Resources

== Minnesota ==
- Minnesota Department of Natural Resources

== Mississippi ==
- Mississippi Department of Wildlife, Fisheries, and Parks

== Missouri ==
- Missouri Department of Conservation

== Montana ==
- Montana Department of Fish, Wildlife and Parks

== Nebraska ==
- Nebraska Game and Parks Commission

== Nevada ==
- Nevada Department of Wildlife

== New Hampshire ==
- New Hampshire Fish and Game Department
  - Wildlife Division
  - Inland Fisheries Division
  - Marine Fisheries Division
  - Law Enforcement Division, provide enforcement for wildlife, fisheries (inland and marine) and offroad vehicle recreation.

== New Jersey ==
- New Jersey Department of Environmental Protection
  - New Jersey Division of Fish and Wildlife

== New Mexico ==
- New Mexico Department of Game and Fish

== New York ==
- New York State Department of Environmental Conservation
  - New York State Department of Environmental Conservation Police
  - Division of Forest Protection, New York State Forest Rangers

== North Carolina ==
- North Carolina Wildlife Resources Commission
- North Carolina Department of Environmental Quality
  - Division of Marine Fisheries, is responsible for managing and protecting North Carolina's Marine and Estuarine fisheries. The North Carolina Marine Patrol under the Division of Marine Fisheries ensures protection of this resource.

== North Dakota ==
- North Dakota Game and Fish Department

== Northern Mariana Islands ==
- CNMI Bureau of Environmental and Coastal Quality

== Ohio ==
- Ohio Department of Natural Resources

== Oklahoma ==
- Oklahoma Department of Wildlife Conservation

== Oregon ==
- Oregon Department of Fish and Wildlife
- Oregon State Police Fish and Wildlife

== Pennsylvania ==
- Pennsylvania Fish and Boat Commission
- Pennsylvania Game Commission
- Pennsylvania Department of Conservation and Natural Resources

== Rhode Island ==
- Rhode Island Department of Environmental Management

== South Carolina ==
- South Carolina Department of Natural Resources

== South Dakota ==
- South Dakota Department of Game, Fish, and Parks

== Tennessee ==
- Tennessee Valley Authority#Recreation
- Tennessee Wildlife Resources Agency
  - Tennessee Wildlife Resources Agency#Law enforcement TWRA officers

== Texas ==
- Texas Department of Public Safety#Texas Rangers)
- Texas Parks and Wildlife Department
- Texas Department of Public Safety#Texas Rangers

(Texas Ranger Division)

== Utah ==
- Utah Department of Natural Resources
  - Utah Department Natural Resources Division Forestry, Fire and State Lands
  - Utah Geological Survey
  - Utah Office of Energy Development
  - Utah Public Lands
  - Utah Division of Wildlife Resources (Last)

== Vermont ==
- Vermont Agency of Natural Resources
  - Vermont Department of Fish and Wildlife
- Vermont Department of Forests, Parks and Recreation

== Virginia ==
- Virginia Department of Wildlife Resources
- Virginia Marine Resources Commission. Enforcement is conducted by the Virginia Marine Police.

== Washington (state) ==
- Washington State Department of Natural Resources
- Washington State Department of Fish and Wildlife

== West Virginia ==
- West Virginia Division of Natural Resources

== Wisconsin ==
- Wisconsin Department of Natural Resources

== Wyoming ==
- Wyoming Game and Fish Department
- Wyoming Division of State Parks and Historic Sites

The Wyoming Division of State Parks and Historic Sites is the Wyoming state agency that administers its state parks.

Also known as Wyoming State Parks, Historic Sites & Trails, the agency is headquartered in Cheyenne, Wyoming.

== See also ==
- United States Fish and Wildlife Service
- United States Department of Commerce, National Oceanic and Atmospheric Administration
  - National Ocean Service
  - National Marine Fisheries Service
  - National Oceanic and Atmospheric Administration Fisheries Office of Law Enforcement under the National Marine Fisheries Service
- National Park Service
- National Forest Service
- Bureau of Land Management
- Atlantic States Marine Fisheries Commission
- List of provincial and territorial fish and wildlife management agencies in Canada
