= Federal Correctional Institution, Pollock =

Federal prison in Louisiana, United States

Coordinates: 31°27′57″N 92°26′29″W

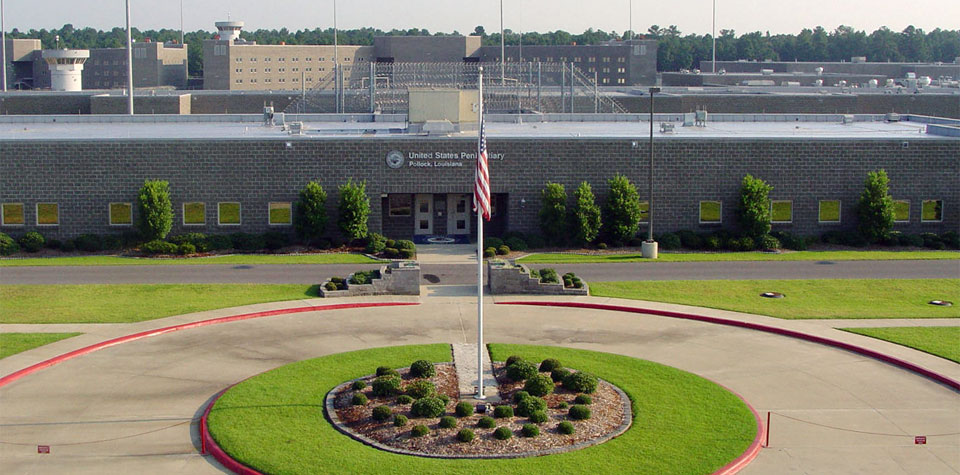
- Interactive map of Federal Correctional Institution, Pollock
- Location: Grant Parish, near Pollock, Louisiana
- Status: Operational
- Security class: Medium-security
- Population: 1,600
- Opened: 2007
- Managed by: Federal Bureau of Prisons

The Federal Correctional Institution, Pollock (FCI Pollock) is a medium-security United States federal prison for male inmates in unincorporated Grant Parish, Louisiana. It is part of the Pollock Federal Correctional Complex and operated by the Federal Bureau of Prisons, a division of the United States Department of Justice.

FCC Pollock is located in central Louisiana, approximately 15 miles (24 km) north of Alexandria.

== History ==
FCI Pollock was constructed between 2005 and 2007. It was built by Flintco, an Oklahoma-based construction company which DiversityBusiness.com listed as the top Native American owned company in 2010.

== Notable Inmates (current and former) ==
The Sentencing Reform Act of 1984 eliminated parole for federal inmates. However, inmates sentenced for offenses committed prior to 1987 are eligible for parole consideration.

| Inmate Name | Register Number | Photo | Status | Details |
|---|---|---|---|---|
| Gene Gotti | 04193-016 | | Served 29 years of a 50-year sentence; released on September 14, 2018.† | Former caporegime of the Gambino crime family in New York City and brother of Boss John Gotti; convicted in 1989 of running a multimillion-dollar heroin ring. |
| Shi Lei | 88784-022 | | Scheduled for release in 2033. Now at FCI Yazoo City | Former cook; convicted in 2005 of using violence to seize and exercise control of a vessel in international waters for murdering Captain Chen Chung-She and First Mate Le Da Feng during an unsuccessful hijacking attempt in 2002. |
| Jacques Roy | 44132-177 | | Serving a 35 year sentence. Scheduled for release in 2040. Currently at FMC Fort Worth. | Physician; indicted in 2012 for conspiracy to commit healthcare fraud for allegedly masterminding the largest healthcare fraud in US history, which involved 11,000 patients and resulted in $375 million being fraudulently billed to Medicare and Medicaid. |
| Richard Scutari | 34840-080 | | Released in 2025. Was most recently at FCI Mendota prior to his release. | Former security chief for the white supremacist group The Order and FBI Ten Most Wanted Fugitive; pleaded guilty in 1986 to committing a $3.8 million armored car robbery to finance an effort to overthrow the US government. |

== See also ==
- List of U.S. federal prisons
- Federal Bureau of Prisons
- Incarceration in the United States
