= List of provincial and territorial fish and wildlife management agencies in Canada =

This article is a list of provincial and territorial fish and wildlife management agencies in Canada, by province or territory. Fish and wildlife management is primarily a provincial and territorial responsibility in Canada, with each province or territory having its own dedicated agency or department. While the exact names and structures vary by province and territory, fish and wildlife agencies are often found within ministries such as the Ministry of Natural Resources, Department of Energy and Resource Development, Department of Natural Resources, or Ministry of Energy and Natural Resources. Canada also has the federal department of Natural Resources Canada, as well as park wardens that work for Parks Canada in managing and protecting fish and wildlife in Canada's national parks.

== Alberta ==
- Alberta Environment and Protected Areas
  - Alberta Fish and Wildlife Enforcement Services
- Ministry of Forestry and Parks
  - Alberta Parks
    - Park Services Rangers
- Department of Alberta Sustainable Resource Development
  - Alberta Fish and Game Association

== British Columbia ==
- Ministry of Environment and Climate Change Strategy
  - BC Parks and Conservation Officer Service Division
    - British Columbia Conservation Officer Service
    - BC Parks Rangers

== Manitoba ==
- Department of Natural Resources and Northern Development
  - Manitoba Conservation Officer Service
- Department of Environment and Climate Change
  - Manitoba Parks
    - Manitoba Parks Officers

== Newfoundland and Labrador ==
- Department of Fisheries, Forestry and Agriculture
  - Resource Enforcement Division
- Department of Industry, Energy, Technology, and Natural Resources
  - Wildlife Division

== New Brunswick ==
- Department of Energy and Resource Development
  - Fish and Wildlife branch
- Department of Justice and Public Safety
  - Conservation Enforcement Section

== Northwest Territories ==
- Department of Environment and Climate Change
  - Government of the Northwest Territories Resource Management Officers
- Department of Industry, Tourism and Investment
  - NWT Parks
    - NWT Parks Workers

== Nova Scotia ==
- Department of Natural Resources and Renewables
  - Regional Services Branch
    - Enforcement Division

== Nunavut ==
- Nunavut Department of Environment
  - Wildlife Operations
- Nunavut Wildlife Management Board
- Regional Wildlife Organizations
  - Qikiqtaaluk Wildlife Board
    - Mayukalik Hunters & Trappers
    - Resolute Bay Hunters & Trappers
    - Clyde River Hunters & Trappers
    - Hall Beach Hunters & Trappers
    - Iviq Hunters & Trappers
    - Nattivak Hunters & Trappers
    - Igloolik Hunters & Trappers
    - Ikajutit Hunters & Trappers
    - Amarok Hunters & Trappers
    - Aiviq Hunters & Trappers
    - Pond Inlet Hunters & Trappers
    - Pangnirtung Hunters & Trappers
    - Sanikiluaq Hunters & Trappers
  - Kivalliq Wildlife Board
    - Naujaat Hunters & Trappers
    - Baker Lake Hunters & Trappers
    - Aiviit Hunters & Trappers
    - Arviat Hunters & Trappers
    - Aqigiq Hunters & Trappers
    - Rankin Inlet Hunters & Trappers
    - Issatik Hunters and Trappers
  - Kitikmeot Regional Wildlife Board
    - Ekaluktutiak Hunters & Trappers
    - Gjoa Haven Hunters & Trappers
    - Taloyoak Hunters & Trappers
    - Kurtairujuark Hunters & Trappers

== Ontario ==
- Ontario Ministry of Natural Resources
  - Fish and Wildlife Services Branch
    - Ontario Conservation Officers
- Ministry of the Environment, Conservation and Parks
  - Ontario Parks
    - Ontario Parks Park Wardens

== Prince Edward Island ==
- Department of Environment, Water and Climate Change
  - Forests, Fish and Wildlife Division
- Department of Justice and Public Safety
  - Conservation and Enforcement Section

== Quebec ==
- Ministry of Natural Resources and Forests
  - Quebec Wildlife Protection and Resources
    - Quebec Conservation and Fisheries Officers

== Saskatchewan ==
- Saskatchewan Department of Natural Resources
  - Saskatchewan Conservation Officer Service
- Ministry of Parks, Culture and Sport
  - Saskatchewan Park Rangers
- Ministry of Environment
  - Fish and Wildlife Branch

== Yukon ==
- Yukon Fish and Wildlife Management Board
- Department of Environment
  - Yukon Conservation Officers

== Gallery ==
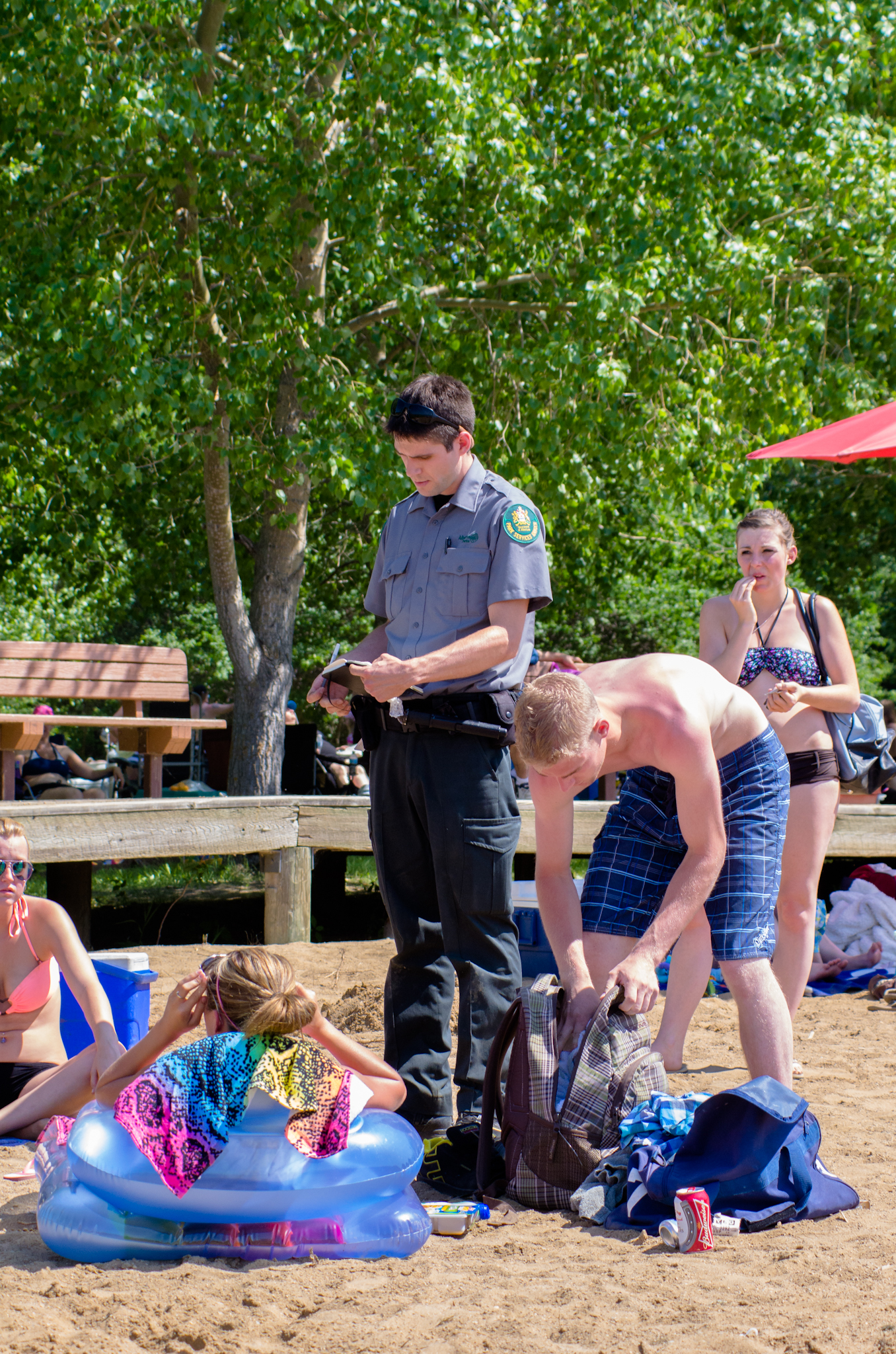
Alberta Park Services Ranger

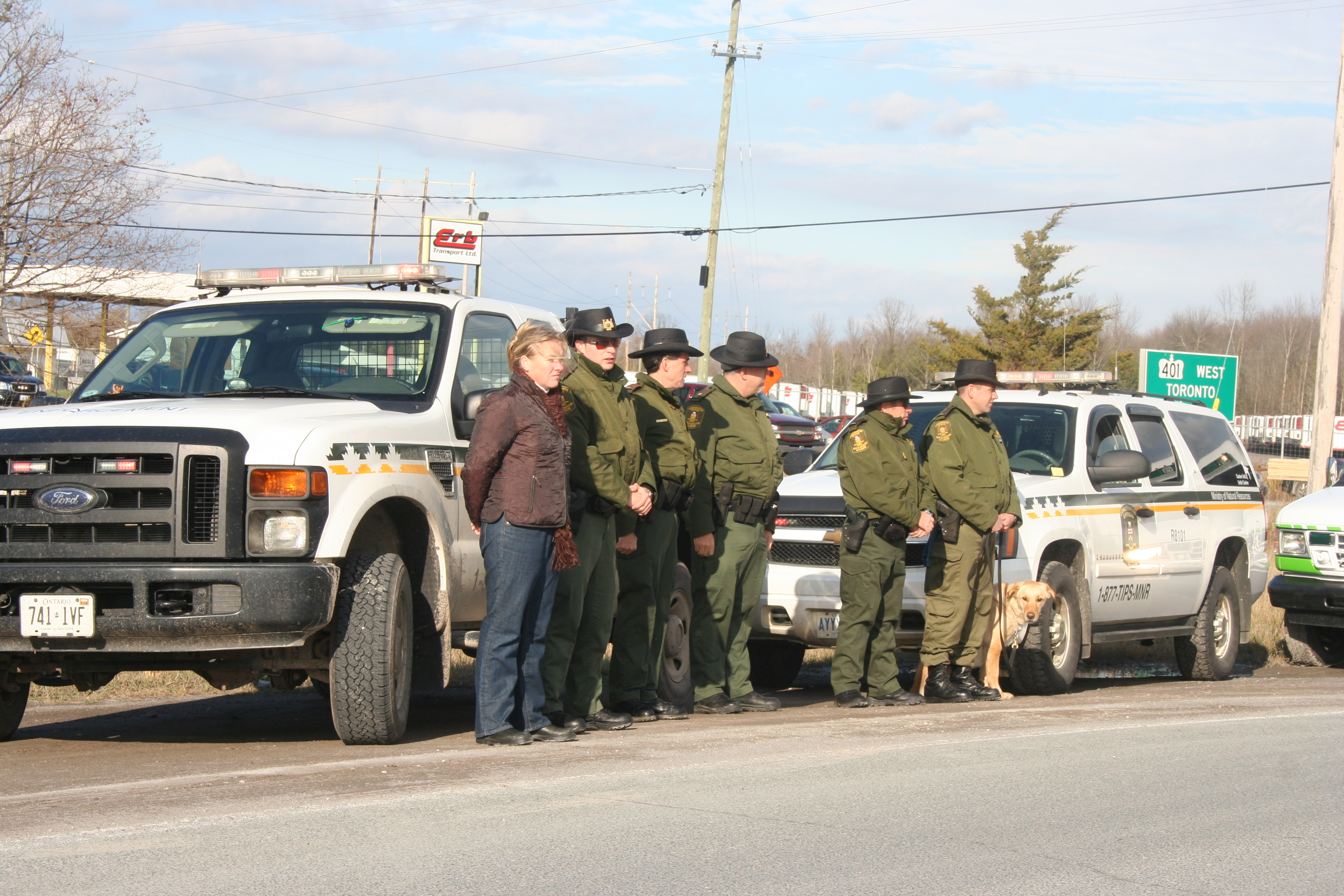
Ontario Conservation Officers

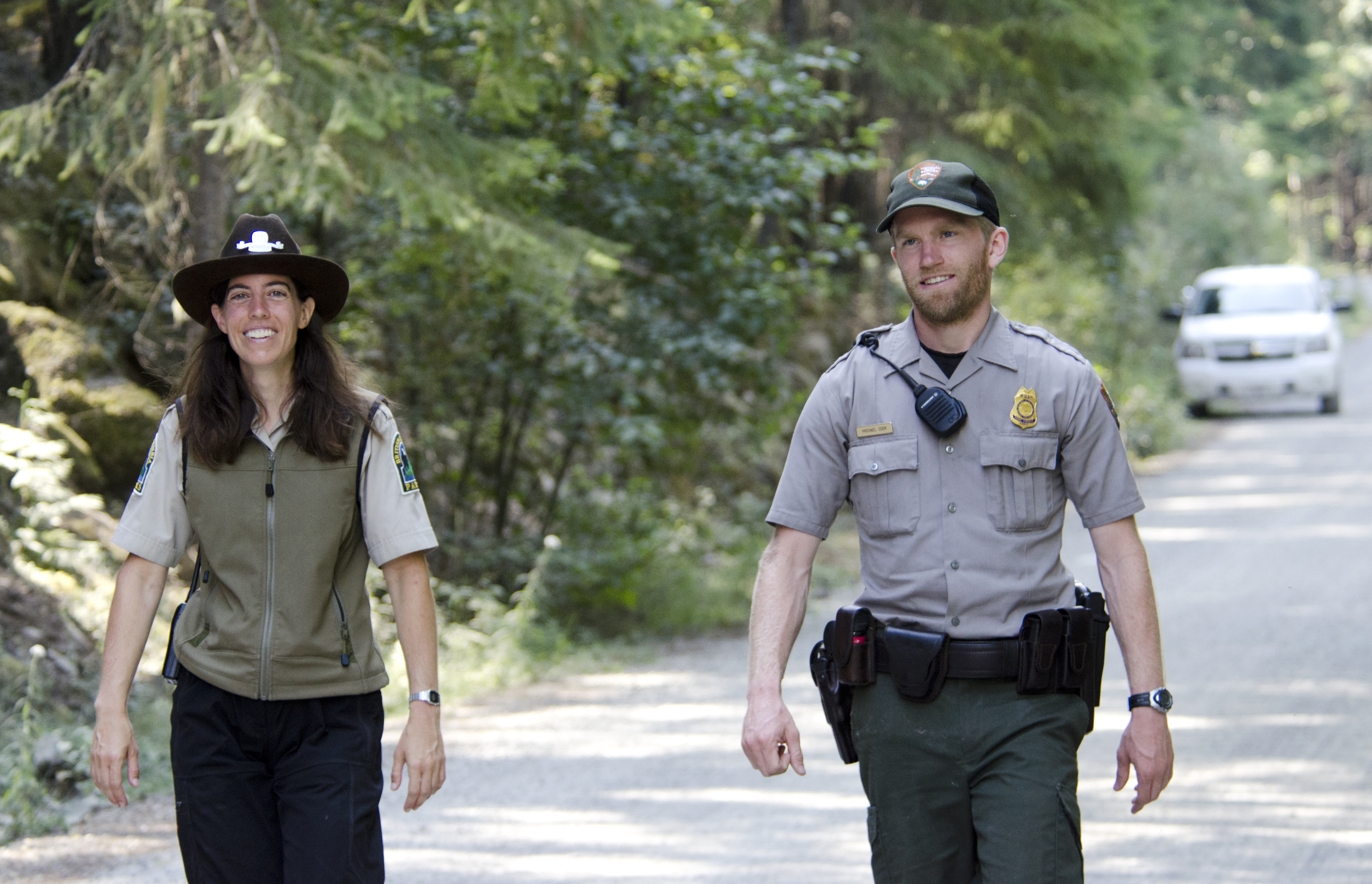
BC Parks Ranger (Left)

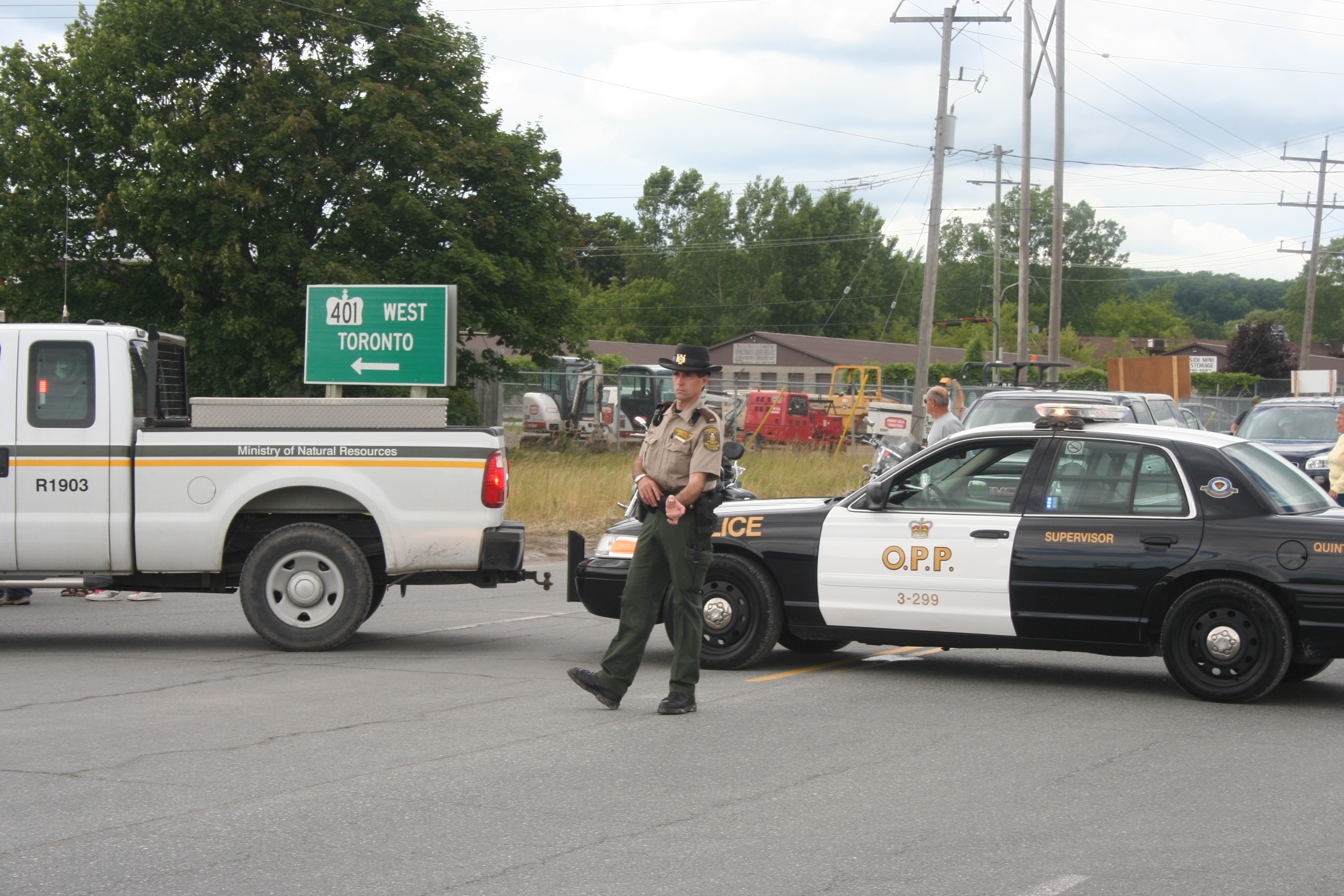
Ontario Conservation Officer

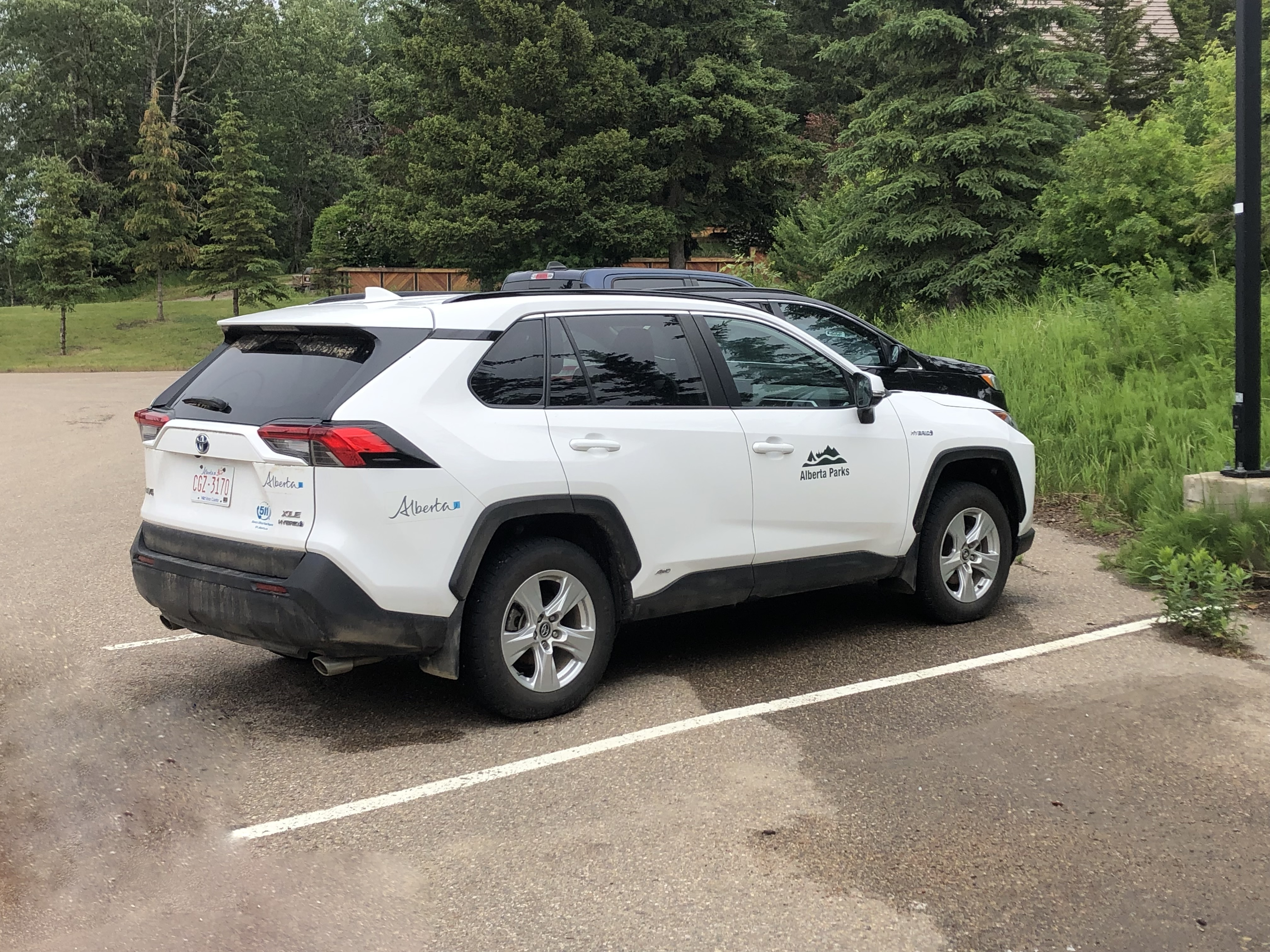
Alberta Parks vehicle

== See also ==
- Parks Canada wardens
- Fishery Officers
- Environment Canada Enforcement Branch
- Natural Resources Canada
- List of state and territorial fish and wildlife management agencies in the United States
- Conservation officer
