= North Dakota Game and Fish Department =

Agency overview
- Formed: 1930; 96 years ago
- Preceding agency: Game and Fish Board of Control (1909-1929)
- Jurisdiction: State of North Dakota
- Headquarters: 100 N. Bismarck Expressway, Bismarck, North Dakota 58501; 46.806189°N 100.732312°W
- Agency executives: Jeb Williams, Director; Casey Anderson, Deputy Director
- Website: gf.nd.gov/index.php/

The North Dakota Game and Fish Department is the State of North Dakota's State agency charged with stewardship of the state's fish, game, and wildlife resources. The department sets fish and game regulations, including issuance of hunting and fishing licenses and enforcement of state regulations throughout the state. The department also enforces watercraft regulations and registration, along with enforcement of Invasive species laws.

== Organization ==
The agency is headquartered in Bismarck, with District Offices located in: Devils Lake, Dickinson, Jamestown, Harvey, Riverdale, and Williston. The agency is organized into five divisions:

- Administrative Services - Manages Information Technology, accounting, and issues boat registrations along with hunting and fishing licenses.
- Conservation/Communication - Manages outdoor education, interpretation, and encourages conservation practices throughout the state.
- Enforcement - The law enforcement division consists of Game Wardens that patrol the state to enforce fish and game regulations and other state laws.
- Fisheries - Manage the state fisheries and operate the state's fish hatcheries.
- Wildlife - Manage habitat and wildlife species across the state.

== See also ==
- North Dakota Parks and Recreation Department
- List of law enforcement agencies in North Dakota
- Game warden
- List of state and territorial fish and wildlife management agencies in the United States
