= Murder of Rachel Hoffman =

2008 shooting death in U.S. state of Florida

Rachel M. Hoffman
- Born: Rachel Morningstar Hoffman; December 17, 1984; Clearwater, Florida, U.S.
- Died: May 7, 2008 (aged 23); Tallahassee, Florida, U.S.
- Body discovered: Perry, Florida

On May 7, 2008, 23-year-old Rachel Morningstar Hoffman (December 17, 1984 – May 7, 2008), was murdered by two drug dealers — 22-year-old Deneilo Bradshaw and 25-year-old Andrea Green — after being pressured to act as a police informant in a botched drug sting by the Tallahassee Police Department. Her body was recovered two days later near Perry, Florida. Hoffman's death led to the implementation of "Rachel's Law", which imposed stricter requirements for law enforcement agencies for undercover informants operating in Florida.

== Background ==
Rachel Hoffman was born in Clearwater, Florida and attended Countryside High School. At the time of her death, she had graduated from Florida State University with a bachelor's degree and was planning to attend a culinary school in Arizona.

== Sting operation and death ==
Hoffman was under drug court supervision for possession of 25 g (0.9 oz.) of cannabis discovered during a traffic stop on February 22, 2007. On April 17, 2008, the Tallahassee Police Department searched her apartment and uncovered another 151.7 g (5.328 oz.) of cannabis, and four ecstasy pills.

Hoffman faced a possible prison sentence if charged and convicted on criminal charges related to the discovered drugs. Police attempted to persuade her to identify other marijuana dealers to avoid the charges. She refused. The police then pressured her to act as a confidential informant in a drug sting operation in exchange for not being charged with additional drug charges. The purported goal of the operation was to buy 1,500 ecstasy pills, 2 oz. of cocaine, and two handguns, which was contrary to department policy, using $13,000 cash in a buy–bust operation.

Two narcotics officers arranged for the drug buy at a specific location and were providing security for the buy. That was later deemed to be insufficient manpower to protect the informant and still apprehend the suspects.

While she was at the drug buy, with the policemen monitoring, the two suspects changed the location of the buy. Her police handlers attempted to inform her to not follow the suspects to the new location, but technical issues prevented her from actually receiving the instructions. They later lost track of her when the wire improperly installed on her failed, and she agreed with the suspects to change the plans and left the buy spot with the two suspects in their stolen silver BMW. While in transit, the two suspects executed her on dead-end Gardner Road in Leon County with the gun she was supposed to buy.

== Murder investigation and sentencing ==
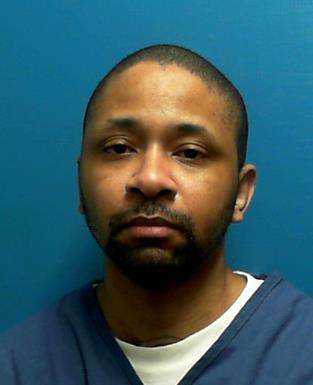
Mugshot of Deneilo Ricardo Bradshaw

According to police documents, a witness described seeing the BMW stuck in a ditch in Taylor County, with a 2005 Volvo belonging to Hoffman idling nearby, between 7:00 p.m. and 7:30 p.m., about 30 minutes after the police lost track of Hoffman. The witness claimed that the BMW drove off when he stopped to help the driver try to get the car out of the ditch, but the vehicle later returned as the witness was leaving. The witness claimed he became suspicious and decided to leave when the driver of the Volvo opened the trunk and revealed a camouflage blanket and neat stacks of female clothing.

Deneilo R. Bradshaw, 22, and Andrea Jabbar Green, 25, who were fired from their jobs at a window tint and car detailing shop just days before the incident, were charged with armed robbery in connection with the events leading up to Hoffman's death.

The Tallahassee Police Department admitted that Hoffman had no training to work undercover, she did not know the two men targeted in the sting, and she had no experience with cocaine or firearms and very little with MDMA. The officers involved in the operation were suspended with pay, and the family filed a wrongful death lawsuit against the city.

The two sellers were charged by a grand jury with first degree murder. Details of the murder itself were not released at the time.

Hoffman's story garnered many news headlines including a page on the Tallahassee Democrat website dedicated to information surrounding her death. 20/20 covered the story on July 25, 2008, and Dateline NBC covered it on January 16, 2009.

On December 17, 2009, which would have been Hoffman's 25th birthday, Bradshaw, one of the murder suspects, was found guilty of first-degree murder with robbery and sentenced to life imprisonment without parole plus 30 years (concurrent). On November 11, 2010, Green pleaded no contest to second-degree murder and robbery with a firearm and was sentenced to life in prison without parole.

== Rachel's Law ==
On May 7, 2009, a law (dubbed "Rachel's Law") was passed by the Florida State Senate, which brought into effect on July 1, 2009 a number of requirements for law enforcement agencies in Florida regarding the use of police informants. While Rachel's Law became statewide policy for all police departments, at least one major city department began taking steps towards training on the new policies at least three months sooner than required.

"Rachel's Law" requires law enforcement agencies to provide special training for officers who recruit confidential informants, instruct informants that reduced sentences may not be provided in exchange for their work, and permit informants to request a lawyer if they want one.

== See also ==
- Death of Andrew Sadek, a confidential informant for police in North Dakota
