= Tallahassee Police Department =

Police department in Tallahassee, Florida, United States

Coordinates: 30.4578°N 84.2793°W

- Common name: Tallahassee Police
- Abbreviation: TPD

Agency overview
- Formed: 1826
- Employees: 422 sworn personnel
- Annual budget: $184,065,062

Jurisdictional structure
- Operations jurisdiction: Tallahassee, Florida, USA
- Area: 103.5 square miles (268 km^{2})
- Population: Approx. 188,107 residents + visitors
- Legal jurisdiction: City of Tallahassee, Florida
- General nature: Civilian police

Operational structure
- Headquarters: 234 E 7th Ave, Tallahassee, FL 32303
- Police Officers: 507 (2025)
- Agency executive: Lawrence Revell, Chief of Police
- Parent agency: Tallahassee, Florida

Facilities
- Citiess: 1

Website
- Official Site

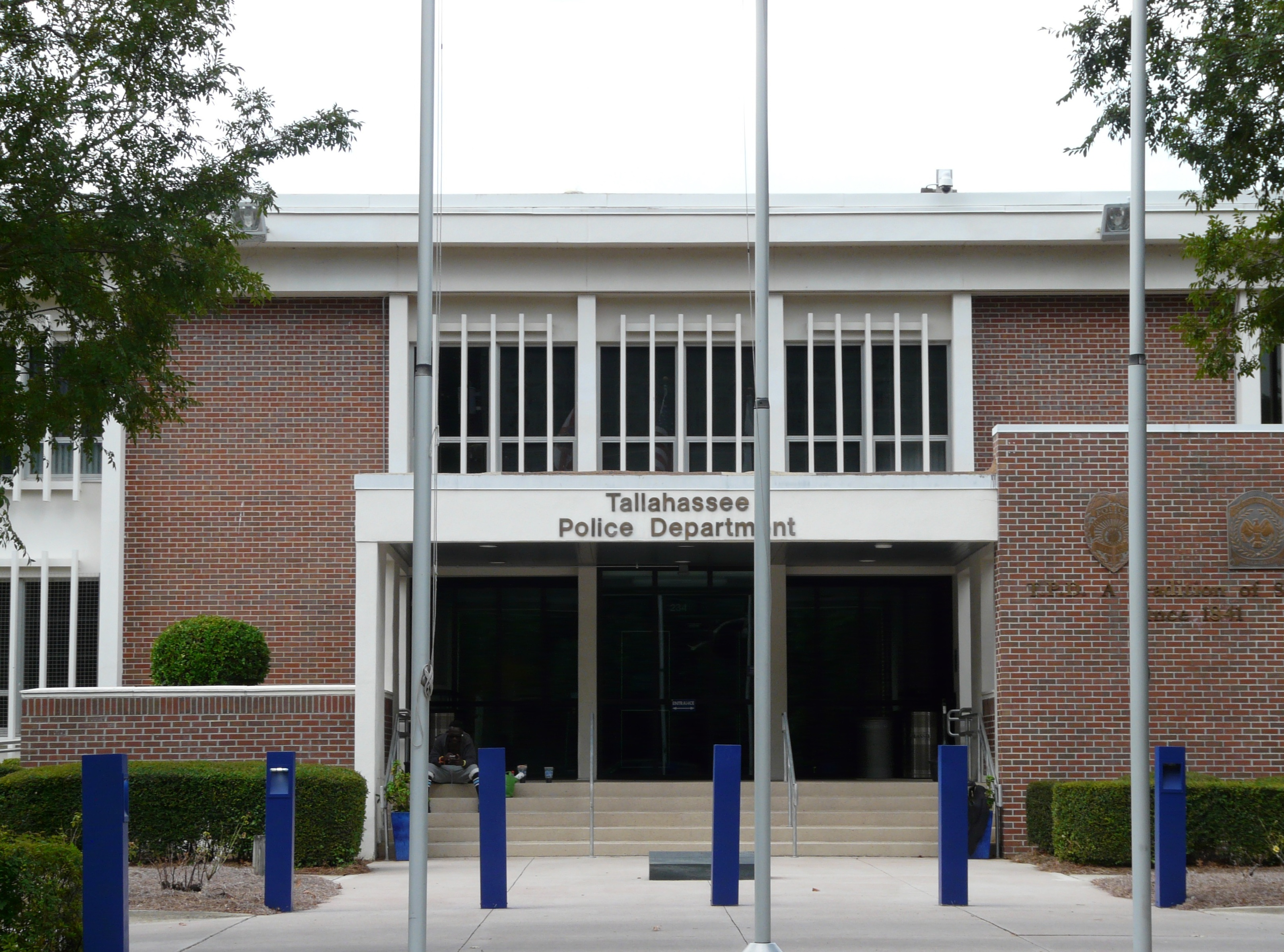
Headquarters on 7th Avenue

The Tallahassee Police Department (TPD) is the municipal police that provides public safety services for the city of Tallahassee, Florida, United States. Within the department, there are twelve primary divisions: The Chief of Police, Internal Affairs, Development Bureau, Investigations, Traffic Enforcement, Crime Analysis Unit, Public Information Office, Towing Administration, Property & Evidence, Operations Bureau, Technology, Records, and Special Operations.

== History ==
The city's police force began operation in 1826, shortly after the city was incorporated, with a single City Marshal constituting the police force. From time to time, special police were hired as circumstances warranted. A compulsory Night Watch was also instituted for a period of time before the Civil War.

The Tallahassee Police Department once claimed to be the oldest continuously-operated police department in the American South, and possibly the second-oldest in the U.S., preceded only by the Philadelphia Police Department established in 1758. The Boston Police Department was established in 1838. Larger east coast cities followed with New York City and Baltimore in 1845. However, Colonial America must have had municipal police forces, but lack of verifiable records may make it difficult, if not impossible, to accurately rank police forces from oldest to newest. Southern public officials were suspended from public office from May - November 1865 by the occupying Federal troops, except for marshals and police. Therefore, Tallahassee's police force continued to operate during late 1865 while most other officials ceased to hold any official powers. To illustrate the difficulty in ranking municipal police forces from oldest to newest, Pensacola, Florida—for example—began its police force as early as 1822—predating Tallahassee's.

With Reconstruction and civil rights bestowed on black citizens, for several years during the 1870s, much of the Tallahassee City Council and the entire police force—including the City Marshal—were black. Also during this period, the only two blacks ever to serve as Leon County Sheriff until November 2016 occupied that post. But, the era of the black Southern public official was short lived and, with passage of Florida's 1885 Constitution (replacing the 1868 "carpetbagger" Constitution), black suffrage was effectively quashed. Control of public offices became white-only (until the 1964 Civil Rights Act).

In 1892, the position of City Marshal was renamed to Chief of Police. This appointee was typically nominated by the Mayor and ratified by the City Council. After the 1920 change from a strong mayor form of government to the Commission-Manager form of government, the City Commission appointed the Police Chief—until the late 1920s—when the Police Chief became an employee appointed directly by the City Manager without input from the City Commission.

== Controversies ==
=== Drug sting resulting in death of Rachel Hoffman ===
The Tallahassee Police Department was the subject of intense scrutiny after a botched buy-bust operation ended in a fatal tragedy on May 7, 2008, with the execution-style murder of 23-year-old Rachel Hoffman. Hoffman, a recent graduate of Florida State University who had been convicted of drug charges, was serving in an undercover capacity, alone, when she was murdered by two suspected drug dealers while nearly 20 TPD officers and a DEA plane were supervising the operation. A subsequent grand jury investigation was highly critical of the planning and execution of the operation, and a subsequent TPD internal affairs investigation found negligence and multiple policy violations by the Vice squad and individual police officers involved. Following Hoffman's death, the Florida legislature enacted "Rachel's Law," and established minimum guidelines for law enforcement to use when engaging civilians in undercover operations. In a civil suit alleging wrongful death, the City of Tallahassee paid the Hoffman family $2.6 million in damages.

=== Legal challenge ===
In 2008 a Tallahassee resident, Robert Brayshaw, was arrested for violating a Florida statute which prohibited individuals from "maliciously, with intent to obstruct the due execution of the law or with the intent to intimidate, hinder or interrupt any law enforcement officer in the legal performance of his or her duties, publish or disseminate the residence address or telephone number of any law enforcement officer while designating the officer as such..." Brayshaw had posted, online, the name of a Tallahassee police officer, along with her home address, cell phone number and age, and had further criticized the officer, stating that she was verbally abusive, rude and unprofessional. Brayshaw brought an action in federal court, challenging the constitutionality of the Florida statute, claiming a right to free speech under the First Amendment. The case was heard in U.S. District Court. On April 30, 2010, Judge Richard Smoak ruled in favor of Brayshaw, striking down the 1972 Florida law, finding that the statute was "unconstitutional on its face". Smoak also ordered the city of Tallahassee to pay Brayshaw's legal expenses of $25,000. The State of Florida paid $35,000 for the challenge of the law as declared Unconstititional on its face. WIRED Magazine ran multiple stories billing the case as "The "Dumbest Ever".

=== Investigation of alleged sexual assault ===
On April 16, 2014, The New York Times reported irregularities in the investigation of an alleged sexual assault involving Florida State University quarterback Jameis Winston. A medical examination of the unnamed female revealed injuries consistent with sexual contact—bruises, semen—and the woman would later identify Jameis Winston by name as her alleged attacker. Tallahassee police did not promptly obtain a DNA sample from Winston. When police contacted Winston by phone, he initially delayed responding. Then, on advice from his attorney, Winston declined to be interviewed. The initial TPD investigation did not uncover the fact that a video of the sexual encounter had been taken by Seminoles teammate Chris Casher. The video was later deleted or lost by Casher.

=== Shooting of Tony McDade ===
On May 27, 2020, a white TPD officer shot 38-year-old African-American Tony McDade, a 38-year-old trans man, following reports of a fatal stabbing in Leon Arms Apartments. The evening before the incident, McDade was physically assaulted. He later posted a video on Facebook in which he vowed to kill his attackers and would rather die at the hands of police than return to prison. The incident drew criticism as official police statements described McDade as a "woman" who "identified as a man". Eyewitness statements to local media contradicted police statements that McDade was armed with a gun at the time.

A vigil was organised for May 28, this being the third police-shooting (after Wilbon Cleveland Woodard, and Mychael Johnson) since the appointment of Ravell as Chief of Police in December 2019.

== Divisions ==
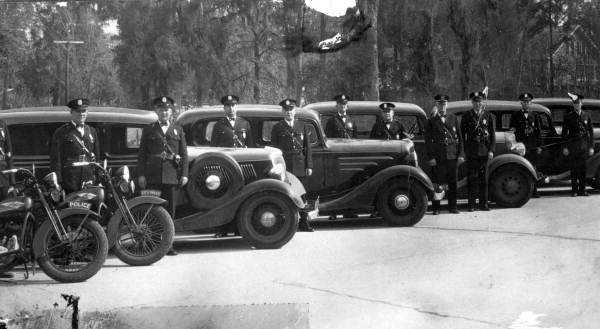
Tallahassee Police Department (1937)

=== Chief of Police ===
- Tallahassee Police Chief Lawrence Revell

Lawrence Revell has been named the new Tallahassee Police chief on December 26, 2019.

=== TPD Internal Affairs ===
The Internal Affairs Unit is responsible for ensuring the citizens of Tallahassee can trust the police department. They conduct compliance reviews and maintain the records for high-liability police actions, coordinate and assess secondary employment opportunities, and process, investigate, and maintain managerial oversight of any citizen complaints to ensure all police personnel comply with professional standards. The Internal Affairs Unit is responsible for: Internal Investigations (Formal Complaints), Contact Reports (Informal Complaints), Special Investigations (Firearm Discharges), Vehicle Pursuit Compliance Reviews, Use of Force Compliance Reviews, Employee Traffic Crash Compliance Reviews, Secondary Employment Coordination and Compliance Reviews

=== Special Operations ===
The Special Operations Bureau includes sworn police officers and civilians. It is responsible for traffic related operations and other specialty operations. The units are Traffic Enforcement, Special Events Panning, Parking Enforcement, Downtown Officers, Child Passenger Seat Safety Seat Inspections, and Reserve units.

=== Organizational Development Bureau ===
The Organizational Development Bureau includes Building and Fleet Unit, Training Unit and Communications.

- Building & Fleet maintains 93,000 square feet of facilities space, and the 485 vehicles that are used by the department.
- Communications PSC (Public Safety Complex) operates 24 hours a day, 7 days a week, 365 days a year. It is the primary connection between the public and the Police and Fire Departments. The facilities are equipped with an 800 MHz radio system, CAD (Computer Aided Dispatch) system to monitor office activity, Automatic Vehicle Locator (AVL/GPS) tracks the location of every police cars. The Public Safety Communications Operators are required to process and prioritize incoming calls for law enforcement and fire service, as well as other duties.
- Training is responsible for providing up to date information on law enforcement, including firearms, defensive tactics, use of force, emergency vehicle operations and all required/advanced general police topics. The Training section also hosts various courses with professional instructors from around the country.

=== Criminal Investigations Bureau ===
The Criminal Investigations Bureau is responsible for investigating crimes that occur in the City of Tallahassee. It consists of four specialized units: Property Crimes, Persons Crimes, Cold Cases/Crime Stoppers and Forensics.

=== High Risk Offenders Bureau ===
The High Risk Offenders Bureau is composed of the Special Investigations Unit and the Violent Crimes Response Section.

=== Crime Analysis Unit ===
The Crime Analysis Unit employs civilian personnel. It includes an Executive Crime Analyst Supervisor and six Crime Intelligence Analysts. The unit was decentralized in 2016 and are embedded in the Operations (Patrol) Bureau, High Risk Offenders Bureau (HRO), and Criminal Investigations Bureau (CIB)

=== Public Information Office ===
The Public Information Office provides a connection between the citizens of Tallahassee and the Tallahassee Police Department. The office plays a primary role in maintaining the public trust. Members of the office serve as the official spokespersons for the department. They also coordinate responses with the media and civilian inquiries. The PIO encourages a partnership between the community and the police department with events like departmental tours, "Shop with A Cop", "Take Our Daughters and Sons to Work Day" and the "TPD and You Breakfast" with the Police Chief. This type of community involvement embodies the "Trust, Loyalty and Commitment" that are the fundamental foundations through which Chief Michael J. DeLeo leads the Tallahassee Police Department.

== Public resources ==
Tallahassee Online Police Statistics (TOPS) - Launched on August 1, 2007, this web-based crime mapping application allows the public to examine over two dozen crime incident types for the previous six months. Searches include addresses, parks, neighborhoods and Tallahassee Police Crime Watch areas. On August 15, 2008, TOPS version 2.0 was launched, adding new features and a new interface. The site can be accessed via the Tallahassee municipal portal or the Tallahassee-Leon County GIS I-Maps website.

== See also ==
- United States v. Drayton
- List of U.S. state and local law enforcement agencies
