= Death of Andrew Sadek =

2014 shooting death in U.S. state of North Dakota

Andrew Sadek
- Sadek in 2014
- Born: November 22, 1993; Valley City, North Dakota, U.S.
- Disappeared: May 1, 2014 (aged 20); Wahpeton, North Dakota, U.S.
- Died: Unknown; believed to have been killed shortly after disappearance
- Cause of death: Gunshot wound
- Body discovered: June 27, 2014, Breckenridge, Minnesota, U.S.
- Known for: Unsolved death while working as a confidential informant in drug investigations

Andrew Sadek (November 22, 1993 – c. May 1, 2014) was a student at the North Dakota State College of Science (NDSCS) in Wahpeton, North Dakota, United States. Following a 2013 arrest for felony charges of selling cannabis that legally could have resulted in a long prison sentence, Sadek agreed to work as a confidential informant (CI) for the South East Multi-County Agency Narcotics Task Force (SEMCA) in exchange for having the charges dropped. Under police supervision, he bought more cannabis from other sellers around the NDSCS campus.

Sadek was last seen leaving his dormitory on the morning of May 1, 2014. Almost two months later, his body was found in the Red River north of Breckenridge, Minnesota, adjacent to Wahpeton, with a gunshot wound to the head. Although the manner of death remains undetermined, police informally indicated that they believe it was a suicide. Sadek's family insists he was murdered, citing that the backpack that was attached to his body was filled with rocks and that neither a suicide note nor the weapon used in his death was ever found.

At his mother's behest, the state investigated the police handling of his case but found no serious concerns, although SEMCA did make minor changes in its procedures afterwards. Sadek's parents filed a lawsuit over the case and campaigned for changes to state law that would reduce penalties for marijuana possession on college campuses and protect CIs, much like a similar statute in Florida passed after the 2008 murder of Rachel Hoffman. Those changes were made through a piece of legislation dubbed "Andrew's Law", which was passed in 2017.

== Background ==
Andrew Sadek was born in Valley City, North Dakota, and raised on his family's cattle farm outside nearby Rogers. In 2005, his older brother and only sibling, Nicholas, was killed in a grade crossing accident. Andrew's family and teachers described him as being quiet and shy. After graduating from Valley City High School, Sadek began attending North Dakota State College of Science (NDSCS) in Wahpeton in 2012, with the aim of becoming an electrical technician.

In April 2013, Sadek apparently began selling marijuana, meeting customers in the school's parking lots. On two occasions, the buyer was another student working as a confidential informant (CI) for the South East Multi-County Agency Narcotics Task Force (SEMCA), a multi-jurisdictional law enforcement agency which provides policing services to three southeastern North Dakota counties (Ransom, Richland and Sargent), plus Wilkin County in neighboring Minnesota, focusing on drug enforcement. Sadek's first sale to the CI was 1/8 of an ounce (3.5 g) for $60; the second was one gram for $20. Based on these buys, in November, SEMCA performed a consent search on Sadek's dorm room, where they found an orange plastic grinder with marijuana residue. While Sadek admitted the marijuana was his, he was not arrested or charged.

The following day, Sadek met with Richland County deputy sheriff and SEMCA officer Jason Weber, who informed him that because he had sold marijuana on a college campus, he faced a Class A felony charge and a possible sentence of 40 years in prison: "Obviously, you're probably not going to get 40 years, but is it a good possibility you're going to get prison time if you don't help yourself out? Yeah, there is", Sadek was told. In fact, it is questionable if he would have been sentenced to prison at all, as opposed to probation or a brief stop in jail.

Sadek agreed to work as a CI as well to avoid the potential penalty. Shortly afterwards, he made his first controlled buys as a CI. Twice before the month ended, he bought another 1/8 ounce of marijuana from another dealer on the NDSCS campus, in the same parking lot, for $60 each. In January 2014, he bought a similar amount from a different dealer, one identified by SEMCA officers.

Following the January buy, Sadek stopped keeping up contact with SEMCA; he needed to make one more buy from the same dealer he had bought from in January, plus one more from a third dealer, to fulfill his obligations to them. He never made those buys. Sadek's family says he was preparing for life after school; he had interviewed for work as an electrician in Bismarck and Grand Forks, and had begun dating a new girlfriend.

== Disappearance and death ==
Sadek returned to Rogers on the weekend of April 25 to visit his parents and tend to his cattle herd. His mother called him late the following night after he returned to the NDSCS campus. That was his last contact with his family.

Several nights later, on April 30, Sadek returned to his dorm at Nordgaard Hall with a group of friends, where they watched a movie before going to bed. When Kugel awoke the next morning, he saw that Sadek was gone and presumed he might have gone to see his girlfriend. However, after Sadek did not attend classes that day, and had not returned by the next afternoon, Kugel and Sadek's friends reported him missing to NDSCS campus police. A review of security cameras at Nordgaard Hall captured an image of Sadek leaving the building after 2 a.m. on May 1, wearing jeans and a Tampa Bay Buccaneers hooded sweatshirt, and carrying a black backpack. He was carrying his cell phone but it was not turned on.

SEMCA assumed Sadek had fled to avoid further CI work, and had him formally charged with the two felonies in an attempt to motivate him to return. Arrest warrants were issued. Sadek's parents pleaded publicly for him to come home and help with the spring calving on the farm.

The search ended almost two months later, on June 27. A police dive team doing a training exercise found Sadek's body in the Red River near Breckenridge, Minnesota, just across from Wahpeton. His remains were identified through dental records.

== Investigation ==
Two months later, investigators from North Dakota and Minnesota released the autopsy report, stating that the cause of Sadek's death was a small-caliber gunshot wound to the head. Whether the wound was self-inflicted could not be determined; several police diving searches have not located the weapon. The backpack Sadek was wearing had been filled with rocks. The Buccaneers sweatshirt was missing, but his body was wearing a jacket that he did not appear to be carrying or wearing on the security camera footage, and which his family did not recognize as one belonging to him. His wallet was also missing.

In press interviews, Sadek's mother Tammy claimed that police never fulfilled a promise to search the river as soon as it went down from its springtime flood stage, which should have been about a month afterwards, and that Sadek's body had only been found when the dive team happened to be doing its training exercise a month after the waters had receded. She also criticized NDSCS campus police, who were in charge of investigating the circumstances of her son's disappearance and death, for not seriously exploring angles that suggested homicide instead. While Tammy conceded that a .22 caliber pistol was missing from the family home, she expressed doubt that her son would have chosen to kill himself with his college graduation only two weeks away. She also pointed out that Sadek had not expressed suicidal thoughts, nor had he written a suicide note.

In December, Tammy revealed that when the family brought his car home from the NDSCS campus after his initial disappearance, they found the carpeting was completely wet, as well as several inches of water in the spare tire well in the trunk. This suggested to the family that someone may have killed Andrew, put his body in the trunk and driven it to the river, then returned to campus. A security camera monitoring the parking lot was not functioning that night. Someone who had talked to Tammy reported seeing three people cleaning a car similar to her son's the night of his disappearance.

Tammy questioned whether the NDSCS campus police were capable of handling the investigation by themselves and asked why the case had not been referred to North Dakota's Bureau of Criminal Investigation (BCI), the Minnesota Bureau of Criminal Apprehension (BCA), or the Federal Bureau of Investigation (FBI). She started a Facebook page about the case, in which she promised to reveal, every few months, further information pointing towards a murder as a way to prod authorities to investigate those leads.

== State review of SEMCA ==
In August 2014, Tammy Sadek called on North Dakota Attorney General Wayne Stenehjem to investigate SEMCA's handling of her son's work as a CI. Stenehjem put together a panel of three veteran law enforcement officers, two from elsewhere in North Dakota and one from neighboring South Dakota. Wahpeton Police Chief Scott Thorsteinson, one of the 11 law enforcement officers on SEMCA's board, defended the use of CIs. "These types of investigations are conducted the same way pretty much everywhere where people breathe in and out", he said. "They never did anything wrong that needed to be changed".

The panel's report, published in early 2015, found that most of SEMCA's handling of Sadek had followed established law and procedure. However, it did suggest placing SEMCA under the authority of a BCI agent, as the agency was one of only two such multi-jurisdictional task forces in the state that was not; the recommendation was followed by the end of the year. Tammy stated that the panel was not truly independent, while John Burton, a California lawyer and vice president of the National Police Accountability Project, told the Associated Press that supposedly independent reviews of law enforcement malfeasance by other people in that field are "just a charade".

== Subsequent developments ==
=== Andrew's Law ===
In December 2015, the CBS News program 60 Minutes compared Sadek's case to that of another NDSCS student who had also been arrested by SEMCA for selling marijuana on campus. Unlike Sadek, the student declined to become a CI after he says he was told a lawyer could not help him even after he asked for one, a claim denied by law enforcement. After leaving that interview, the student retained a lawyer and received a sentence of two years' probation and an $800 fine, considerably less than the 30 years he had been threatened with. An undercover narcotics officer told 60 Minutes that legally he was not required to inform arrestees of their Sixth Amendment rights until after they were charged and about to be asked questions which might elicit self-incriminating answers. Few jurisdictions had, at the time, any consistent policies regarding the handling of young CIs.

Shortly afterwards, Republican gubernatorial candidate Rick Becker announced he was drafting legislation in response to the Sadek case, in cooperation with Sadek's parents, in response to the broadcast. The bill would lower the penalties for possessing marijuana on campus by making the offenses less severe, ending mandatory sentencing and increasing the amount that drug offenders must have to be charged with dealing. The bill also included provisions to protect CIs modeled on Rachel's Law, a similar statute passed in Florida following the 2008 murder of Rachel Hoffman, a 23-year-old killed by dealers in a botched drug sting while she was a CI. Stenehjem, Becker's primary opponent, was unconvinced that the law was needed: "I think we do have protocols in effect, and if we need to make any adjustments to those ... we can do that without legislation."

As the 2017 session prepared to convene, Becker indicated he would introduce the bill, under the name "Andrew's Law", and sought cosponsors. Despite Stenehjem's opposition, the bill passed the North Dakota House of Representatives unanimously in late February. In late April, it passed the North Dakota State Senate with only one vote in opposition. There had been some compromises made when law enforcement expressed concern, and the Sadeks had initially been opposed to that version, but the final version was acceptable to them. A week later, the bill was signed into law by Governor Doug Burgum.

=== Litigation ===
On the second anniversary of the discovery of Sadek's body, his parents filed a wrongful death lawsuit against Richland County and SEMCA officer Jason Weber. They alleged that the county failed to properly train and oversee Sadek for what they were asking him to do, and fraudulently deceived him by overrepresenting the likely severity of the punishment he would receive from a court if he did not cooperate.

At the start of 2017, Weber's attorney, Corey Quinton, asked the court for a gag order preventing the Sadeks or their attorney, Timothy O'Keeffe, from publicizing any information obtained by them during discovery on the grounds that disclosure might hinder the ongoing investigation into Andrew's death or taint the potential jury pool. Quinton pointed to what he said were extremely prejudicial remarks the couple had already made publicly. O'Keeffe responded that those statements had been made as part of general warnings to other parents about the perils of letting their children serve as CIs, and that it was not the Sadeks' intent to affect the case. He did, however, acknowledge that there might be evidence that the court could require be kept confidential. Two days later, the judge declined the motion, saying he did not believe he had the authority.

After a new trial date was set for April 2018, it was again delayed when Tatum O'Brien, another of the family's attorneys, asked that it be postponed since several organizations, including NDSCS and SEMCA, had not provided documents they had requested. The court ruled in the Sadeks' favor and postponed the trial.

In 2019, the district court hearing the case granted the defense motion for summary judgement, holding that although there were triable issues of fact over whether and what standard of care Weber and the county owed Sadek, Weber's assertion that he could potentially face a lengthy prison sentence was a prediction of future events and not deceit as a matter of law. The Sadeks had also offered no evidence that Andrew's death was not proximately caused by the defendants' acts. Its decision was upheld by the state Supreme Court the next year by a 4-1 majority.

The Sadeks had argued that the district court judge, Jay Schmitz, had evaluated their deceit claim improperly, applying the standards of fraud instead, which arise from contract law. Justice Daniel J. Crothers wrote for the majority that even by the common-law standards of deceit claims Weber's statement was still an inactionable prediction. Their other deceit claims had not been pleaded with sufficient specificity. Crothers also found the Sadeks' argument that their timeline evidence of Andrew's work as a drug informant, voluminous as it was, was insufficient to establish that as a proximate cause of his death and would have required a jury to speculate.

Dissenting justice Gerald W. VandeWalle focused on that issue. To him, the Sadeks had presented sufficient evidence to create a triable issue of fact. "[A] jury can be instructed not to speculate", he wrote. "I believe the close proximity in time between the May 1 deadline set by Weber, coupled with Weber's texts threatening Sadek with imminent felony charges, and the date Sadek went missing is sufficient to allow a factfinder to draw a reasonable inference that the defendants' conduct was a proximate cause of his death."

In 2022, the Sadeks filed another action in district court seeking post-judgement relief (essentially a request to relitigate the case), arguing that it had relied on bad-faith assertions by Weber in granting summary judgement two years earlier. The court not only denied the motion as untimely but assessed $1,750 in sanctions against the Sadek's lawyer for filing a frivolous action since there was no active case before it. On appeal, the state Supreme Court upheld the district court the following year.

The final dismissal of their lawsuit did not discourage the Sadeks. "We know that Andrew did not take his own life", Tammy said. "Someone knows what happened in the early morning hours of May 1, 2014. We are always hopeful that the truth will come out."

=== Film ===
On May 28, 2020, a documentary about Sadek's disappearance and death, The Dakota Entrapment Tapes, had its world premiere at the Hot Docs Canadian International Documentary Festival. Directed by Trevor Birney, the film was made by production company Fine Point Films, based in Belfast, with the support of Northern Ireland Screen.

== See also ==
- Deaths in May 2014
- List of solved missing person cases (2010s)
- List of unsolved deaths
