= Killing of Tony McDade =

Police killing in Tallahassee, Florida

- Map of Tallahassee
- Date: May 27, 2020
- Time: c. 11 a.m. EST
- Location: Saxon Street Tallahassee, Florida; 30.415412°N 84.298648°W
- Type: Homicide, police shooting
- Participants: Unnamed officer in the Tallahassee Police Department
- Deaths: Tony McDade
- Charges: None

On May 27, 2020, after 11 a.m., a 38-year-old African-American transgender man, Tony McDade, was fatally shot in the Leon Arms apartment complex by an officer of the Tallahassee Police Department, following the fatal stabbing of Malik Jackson on nearby Saxon Street. Early reports of the incident referred to McDade as a "woman", and on May 28, the police department described McDade as a woman who "identified as a man". On September 3, a Leon County grand jury found that the police use of force against McDade was justified. Police body camera showing McDade pointing a firearm at one of the police officers before being shot was also released.

McDade was a suspect in Jackson's fatal stabbing and police stated that McDade pointed a gun at police and that a bloody knife was found at the scene. Some witnesses have contradicted statements by the Police Department that McDade was armed with a gun. Although it was alleged that the officer had called McDade a racial slur before shooting and killing him, this was later proven false through body camera footage.

== People involved ==
- Malik Jackson, a 21-year-old African-American man, who was fatally stabbed.
- Tony McDade, a 38-year-old African-American trans man. On the morning of the incidents, McDade stated on a Facebook Live video that he would get revenge on some men who had attacked him the day before. His funeral took place on June 6.
- An officer of the Tallahassee Police Department, whose identity was withheld under a controversial application of Florida law, who was placed on administrative leave following the incident, which is common practice with officer involved shootings in the United States.

== Background ==
In 2020, McDade entered into a relationship with Jennifer Jackson, a neighbor of his who was the mother of Malik Jackson. According to her family members, McDade entered Jackson's home on May 25 and pistol-whipped her. On May 26, McDade returned to Jackson's home and allegedly became verbally abusive. This led to a physical altercation with Malik Jackson and other members of Jackson's family. Early on May 27, McDade went live on Facebook to recount being jumped by a group of men, which had been a one-on-one fight before an insult caused four others to join, and vowed revenge. McDade stated he had weapons and planned to fight one of the men;

"It took five of you to kick and punch and have me on the ground in a fetal position. And I came out looking the same way I was before I went in that fetal position...But y'all know what, y'all aint gone look the same when them bullets touch your dome. And I'm posting this live...Warning comes before destruction. And I'm telling you five motherfuckers that you're going to die."

— Tony McDade, Facebook Live Video

He detailed his wounds from the altercation which included a bloody elbow and two lumps on his head. He potentially alludes to an attempted suicide by cop or gun fight with the man;

"Just know before I kill myself through a shootout, because that's what's going to happen, because I'm [going to] pull it out and you know these officers nowadays they see a gun they just [going to] shoot....So that's what I'm pushing for, because I don't want to be here on earth dealing with the government."

— Tony McDade, Facebook Live Video

== Killing ==
According to the Tallahassee Police Department they approached McDade on May 27, as a suspect in the fatal stabbing of Malik Jackson earlier in the day. The Department Police Chief Lawrence Revelle told reporters that; "the suspect was in possession of a handgun, and a bloody knife was found at the scene" and that McDade had pointed a gun at the responding officer. The officer reported this information over the department's radio frequency.

Witnesses have disputed this, claiming that officers said "Stop moving, nigger!" and then shot McDade after he stopped moving. The witnesses also claim that officers never identified themselves or told McDade initially to stop his actions.

== Investigations ==
On May 27, investigations were launched into the stabbing incident, and the officer involved in the subsequent shooting. The officer was placed on administrative leave pending the investigation.

On September 3, a Leon County grand jury found that the police use of force against McDade was justified. Shortly afterward, the City of Tallahassee released video from a police body camera showing McDade pointing a firearm at one of the police officers before being shot.

After the shooting, the Florida Police Benevolent Association sued the city of Tallahassee to block the shooting officer's name from becoming public, citing Marsy's Law, which grants privacy rights to victims of crime. In April 2021, the police union emerged victorious: a Florida appellate court ruled that cops who kill civilians can now have their identities legally protected. However, the Supreme Court of Florida reversed this decision in November 2023.

== Reactions ==
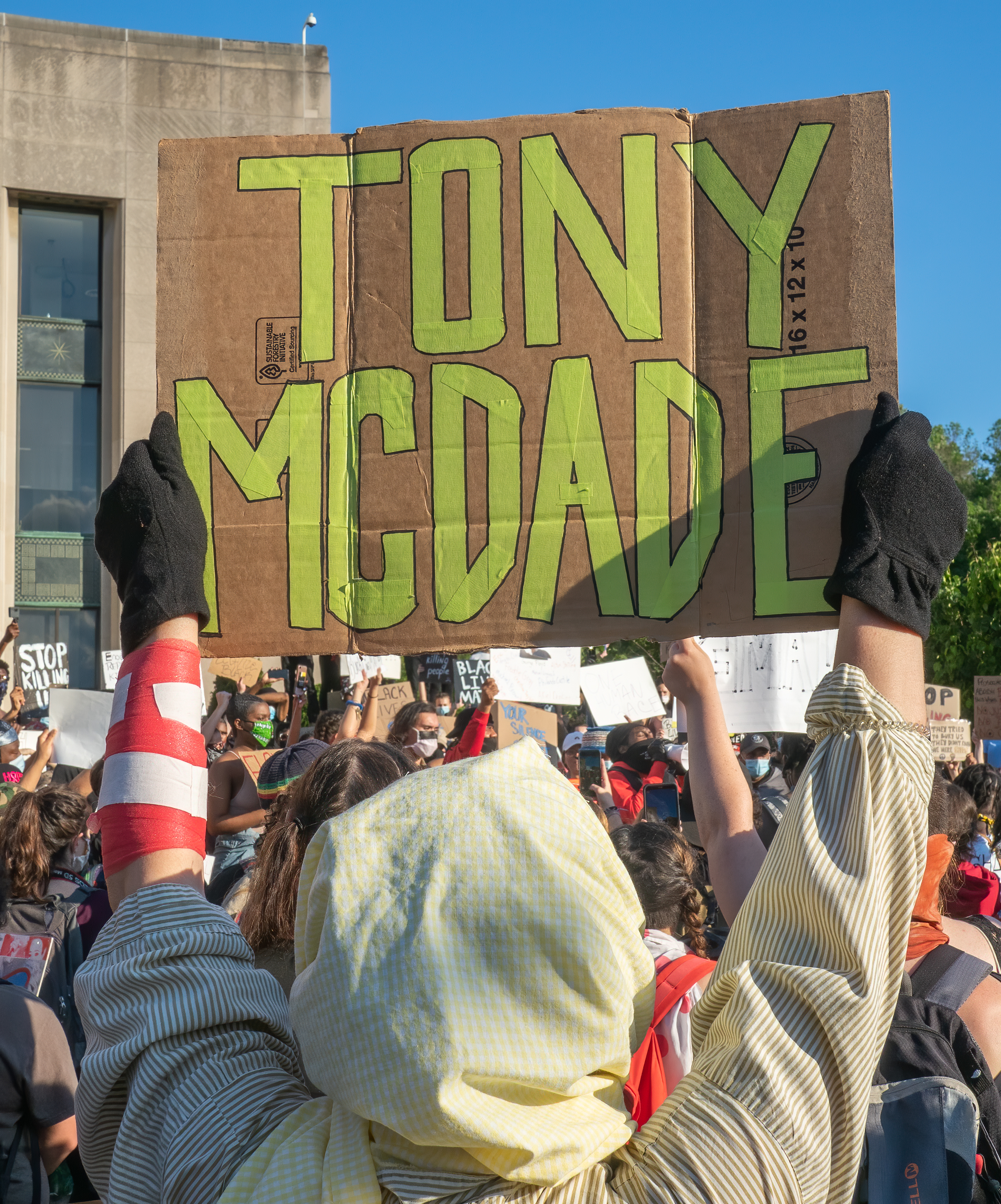
A protester in New York City holds a sign commemorating McDade

Separate vigils took place for both victims on May 28. McDade's was organized by the Tallahassee Community Action Committee, to draw attention to the three police-related deaths (McDade, Wilbon Cleveland Woodard, and Mychael Johnson), since Lawrence Revell assumed the office of Chief of Police in December 2019.

On May 27, a petition was created to publicize the case, and for McDade to be recognized as a transgender man in reports and official statements.

On May 29, Tori Cooper of the LGBTQ advocacy group Human Rights Campaign said, "LGBTQ people of color are at greater risk for violence every day in this country. This must end. Our hearts are heavy as we mourn with Tony's family and friends." Over 100 LGBTQ organizations signed an open letter including McDade in a list of recent transgender killings.

A GoFundMe campaign raised over $190,000 for McDade's family in its first week.

Activist Nicole Cardoza expressed concern that McDade's shooting had received insufficient attention from the Black Lives Matter movement writing, "Throughout the protests, the stories, Black trans people who were victims of police violence, like Tony McDade, got lost in the larger conversation around Black Lives Matter."
