= North Dakota Department of Corrections and Rehabilitation =

- Abbreviation: DOCR

Agency overview
- Preceding agencies: Board of Control; Board of Administration; Director of Institutions
- Employees: 700

Jurisdictional structure
- Operations jurisdiction: North Dakota, USA
- Map of North Dakota Department of Corrections and Rehabilitation's jurisdiction
- Area: 70,762 square miles (183,270 km^{2})
- Population: 765,309 (July 1, 2020 Estimate)
- General nature: Civilian police

Operational structure
- Headquarters: Bismarck, North Dakota
- Agency executive: Dave Krabbenhoft, Director

Website
- DOCR website

The North Dakota Department of Corrections and Rehabilitation (DOCR) provides prison services for the state of North Dakota. Its Division of Field Services supervises parolees through 14 field offices. DOCR also has a Division of Juvenile Services that oversees the supervision and case management of delinquent youth of the state. The agency has its headquarters in Bismarck.

The director of the North Dakota Department of Corrections and Rehabilitation is Dave Krabbenhoft.

== Facilities ==
The department has four different adult prisons in North Dakota Below:

Name	Inmate Capacity
James River Correctional Center - Jamestown	(420)
Missouri River Correctional Center - Bismarck	(151)
North Dakota State Penitentiary- Bismarck	(815)
Dakota Women's Correctional and Rehabilitation Center - New England	(126)

- 605 inmates at North Dakota State Penitentiary - Bismarck
- 417 inmates at James River Correctional Center - Jamestown
- 162 inmates at Dakota Women's Correctional and Rehabilitation Center - New England
- 89 inmates at Missouri River Correctional Center - Bismarck

== Division of Juvenile Services ==
The Division of Juvenile Services (DJS) provides juvenile correctional services operating the North Dakota Youth Correctional Center and maintains eight regional community offices. The North Dakota Youth Correctional Center is located partially in Mandan and partially in unincorporated Morton County.

The housing units include:

- Brown Cottage - 16 beds - for females
- Hickory Cottage - 35 beds - for males
- Pine Cottage - 25 beds - for males

Brown Cottage - 16-bed structure housing female juveniles for Detention, Assessment and Treatment.

Hickory Cottage - 35-bed structure housing male treatment status juveniles. A Mental Health Specialist, a Nurse Practitioner, a dentist office, nurse's offices, and a medical examination room are located on the lower level of Hickory Cottage. An Intensive Outpatient Drug and Alcohol Treatment Program is also located on the lower level of this cottage.

Pine Cottage - 25-bed structure housing male juveniles. Cottage staff provide a variety of programs including Assessment, Detention, Time Out, and Special Management. Additionally, this cottage houses high risk or high maintenance male juveniles. It also serves as the intake cottage for all new male admissions.

== Fallen officers ==
Since its establishment, two officers from the North Dakota Department of Corrections and Rehabilitation have died in the line of duty.

== Reform ==
In 2015, several North Dakota legislators, judges and prison officials flew to Norway and visited Halden Prison. Halden is often called the "most humane prison in the world." The visit aimed to explore ways to reform North Dakota's state prisons to lower recidivism rates and decrease the number of fights in their prisons. North Dakota's DOC has since established softball fields and encouraged vocational training for prisoners at North Dakota State Penitentiary. Furthermore, the duration of solitary confinement has been reduced, now capped at a few days rather than a maximum time of a year

== See also ==
- List of United States state correction agencies
- List of law enforcement agencies in North Dakota
- Prison
