= Hawaii Department of Land and Natural Resources =

U.S. state government agency

Hawaii Department of Land and Natural Resources (DLNR)

Agency overview
- Jurisdiction: Hawaii
- Website: https://dlnr.hawaii.gov

The Hawaii Department of Land and Natural Resources (DLNR) is a part of the Hawaii state government dedicated to managing, administering, and exercising control over public lands, water resources and streams, ocean waters, coastal areas, minerals, and other natural resources of the State of Hawaiʻi. The mission of the Hawaiʻi Department of Land and Natural Resources is to "enhance, protect, conserve and manage Hawaiʻi's unique and limited natural, cultural and historic resources held in public trust for current and future generations of the people of Hawaiʻi nei, and its visitors, in partnership with others from the public and private sectors." The organization oversees over 1.3 million acres of land, beaches, and coastal waters and 750 miles of coastal land.

The DLNR is established in the Hawaiʻi Revised Statutes §26-15 and establishes the Board of Land Natural Resources as the governing entity. The department must follow the Hawaiʻi Administrative Rules Title 13, which details the procedures carried out by the DLNR.

== Organization ==
=== Board of Land and Natural Resources ===
The DLNR is headed by an executive board, the Board of Land and Natural Resources (BLNR). It is composed of seven members, one from each land district and three at large, and the chairperson, who is the executive head of the department. Members are nominated with the consent of the Senate and are appointed by the Governor for a four-year term. No more than three members can be from the same political party and any member having an interest in any matter before the board must recuse themselves from voting or discussing the matter with the rest of the board. One member must have a background in conservation while another member must have demonstrated knowledge of Native Hawaiian traditions and practices. The chairperson is a full-time position appointed by the Governor of Hawaiʻi. The Board convenes twice monthly on the second and fourth Fridays of the month.

=== Commission on Water Resource Management ===
The Commission on Water Resource Management (CWRM) is an attached agency that administers the State Water Code, Chapter 174C of the Hawaii Revised Statutes. It has jurisdiction over land-based surface water and groundwater resources, but not coastal waters and generally, it is responsible for addressing water quantity issues, while water quality issues are under the purview of the Hawaii Department of Health. Of the seven commission members, two are members by virtue of office and five, who must have "substantial experience in water resource management", are appointed by the Governor.

=== Committees ===
The DLNR has seven committees and councils, including the Aha Moku Advisory Committee, the Endangered Species Recovery Committee, the Hawaiʻi Historic Places Review Board, the Island Burials Councils, the Kahoʻolawe Island Reserve Commission, the Legacy Land Conservation Commission, the Natural Area Reserves Commission.

=== Divisions ===
As of 2017, the DLNR has 10 divisions:

- Aquatic Resources - Manages the State's marine and freshwater resources through programs in commercial fisheries and aquaculture; aquatic resources protection, enhancement and education; and recreational fisheries. This division is responsible for establishing Marine Life Conservation Districts. Also issues fishing licenses.
- Boating and Ocean Recreation - Responsible for the management and administration of statewide ocean recreation and coastal areas programs pertaining to the ocean waters and navigable streams of the State (exclusive of commercial harbors) which include 21 small boat harbors, 54 launching ramps, 13 offshore mooring areas, 10 designated ocean water areas, 108 designated ocean recreation management areas, associated aids to navigation throughout the State, and beaches encumbered with easements in favor of the public. Also registers small vessels.
- Bureau of Conveyances - Maintains an accurate, timely and permanent record system for title to real property and other land records. The Bureau examines, records, indexes, and microfilms over 344,000 Regular System and Land Court of Hawaiʻi documents and maps annually; records Certificates of Title issued by the Land Court of Hawaiʻi; certifies copies of matters of record; and researches UCC requests. Hawaiʻi is the only state in the nation with a single statewide land title recording office.
- Conservation and Coastal Lands - Overseeing approximately 2 million acres (8,100 km^{2}) of private and public lands that lie within the State Land Use Conservation District. In addition, to privately and publicly zoned Conservation District lands, OCCL is responsible for overseeing beach and marine lands out to the seaward extend of the State's jurisdiction and to act as the zoning authority of proposed activities taking place on public and private lands. This division also develops land management policies.
- Conservation and Resources Enforcement - Enforces all State laws and rules involving State lands, State Parks, historic sites, forest reserves, aquatic life and wildlife areas, coastal zones, Conservation districts, State shores, as well as county ordinances involving county parks. The division also enforces laws relating to firearms, ammunition, and dangerous weapons.
- Engineering - Administers the Stateʻs programs in water resource development, geothermal resource management, flood control and prevention, dam safety, and soil and water conservation.
- Forestry and Wildlife - Manages of State-owned forests, natural areas, public hunting areas, and plant and wildlife sanctuaries. Program areas cover watershed protection; native resources protection, including unique ecosystems and endangered species of plants and wildlife; outdoor recreation; and commercial forestry. Issues hunting permits.
- Historic Preservation - Preserves and sustains reminders of earlier times which link the past to the present. SHPD maintains three branches, History and Culture, Archaeology, and Architecture.
- Land - Manages State-owned lands and other lands that are not set aside for use by other government agencies. Most of these lands are in the Public Land Trust, which in the Admissions Act states that the land shall be used for the support of the public schools and other public educational institutions, for the betterment of the conditions of Native Hawaiians, for the development of farm and home ownership, for the making of public improvements, and for the provision of lands for public use. The division also serves as an office of record and maintains a central repository of all government documents dating back to the Great Māhele of 1848.
- State Parks - Manages and administers 52 state parks, encompassing nearly 25,000 acres (100 km^{2}) on the 5 major islands. This division is responsible for planning, constructing, operating, and maintaining state parks facilities. They also develop campaigns to heighten visitor awareness and issues camping permits.

== Activities ==
In July 2020, the DLNR removed alien coral species and placed sea urchins in Kāneʻohe Bay to help control the invasive species.

== See also ==
- Natural Area Reserves System Hawaii
- List of Hawaii state parks
- Government of Hawaii
- Hawaii Division of Conservation and Resource Enforcement
- List of state and territorial fish and wildlife management agencies in the United States
