= Hawaii Division of Conservation and Resource Enforcement =

American law enforcement agency

Division of Conservation and Resources Enforcement
- Abbreviation: DOCARE

Agency overview
- Annual budget: $8.1 million

Jurisdictional structure
- Operations jurisdiction: Hawaii, USA
- Governing body: Hawaii Legislature
- General nature: Civilian police

Operational structure
- Conservation and Resources Enforcement Officers (CREO)s: 120 (2009)
- Agency executive: Jason Redulla, Enforcement Chief
- Parent agency: Hawaii Department of Land and Natural Resources

Website
- DLNR DOCARE

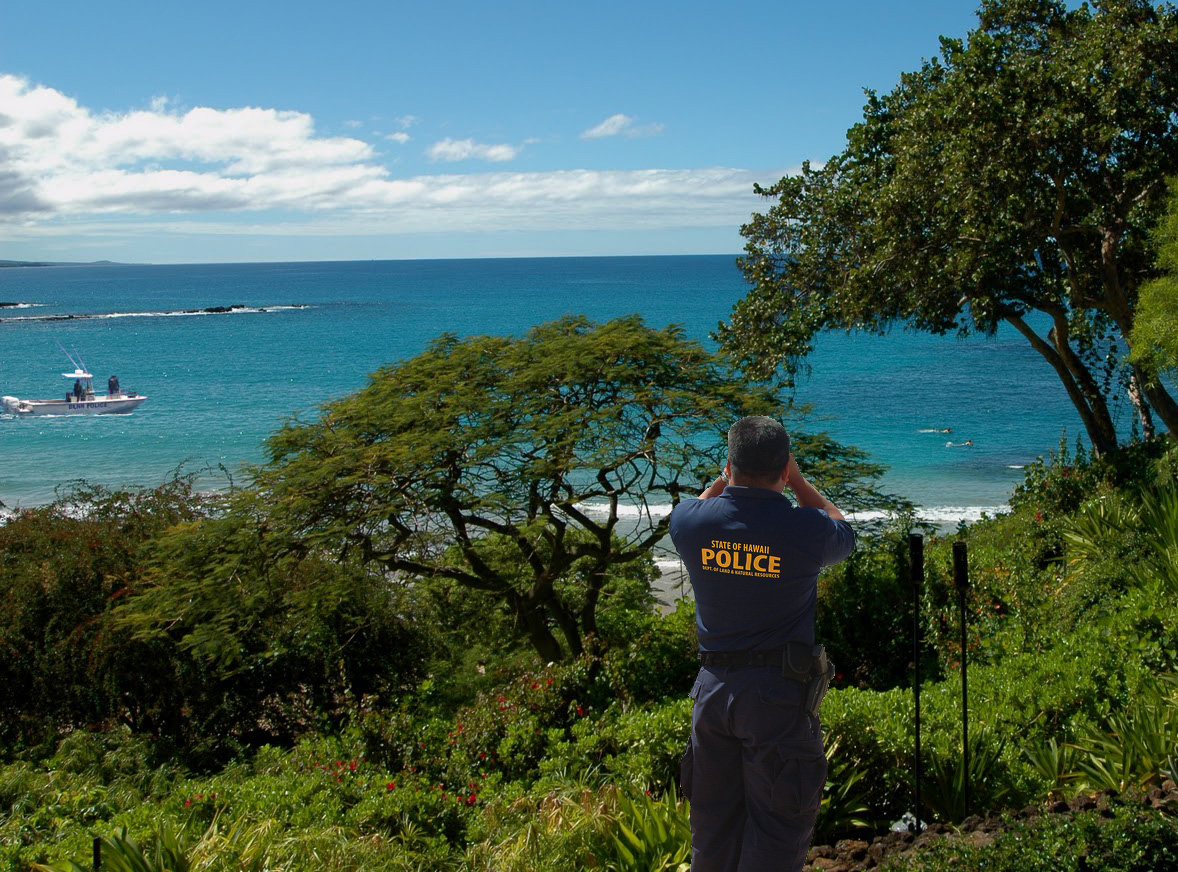
DLNR Police Officer and Patrol Boat

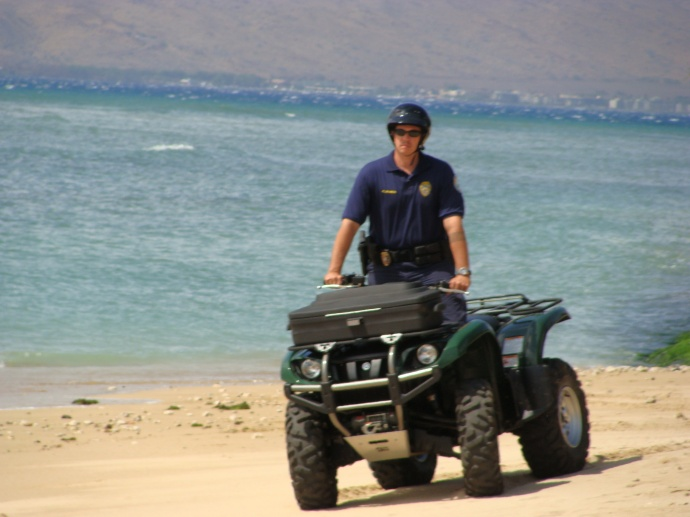
DLNR ATV

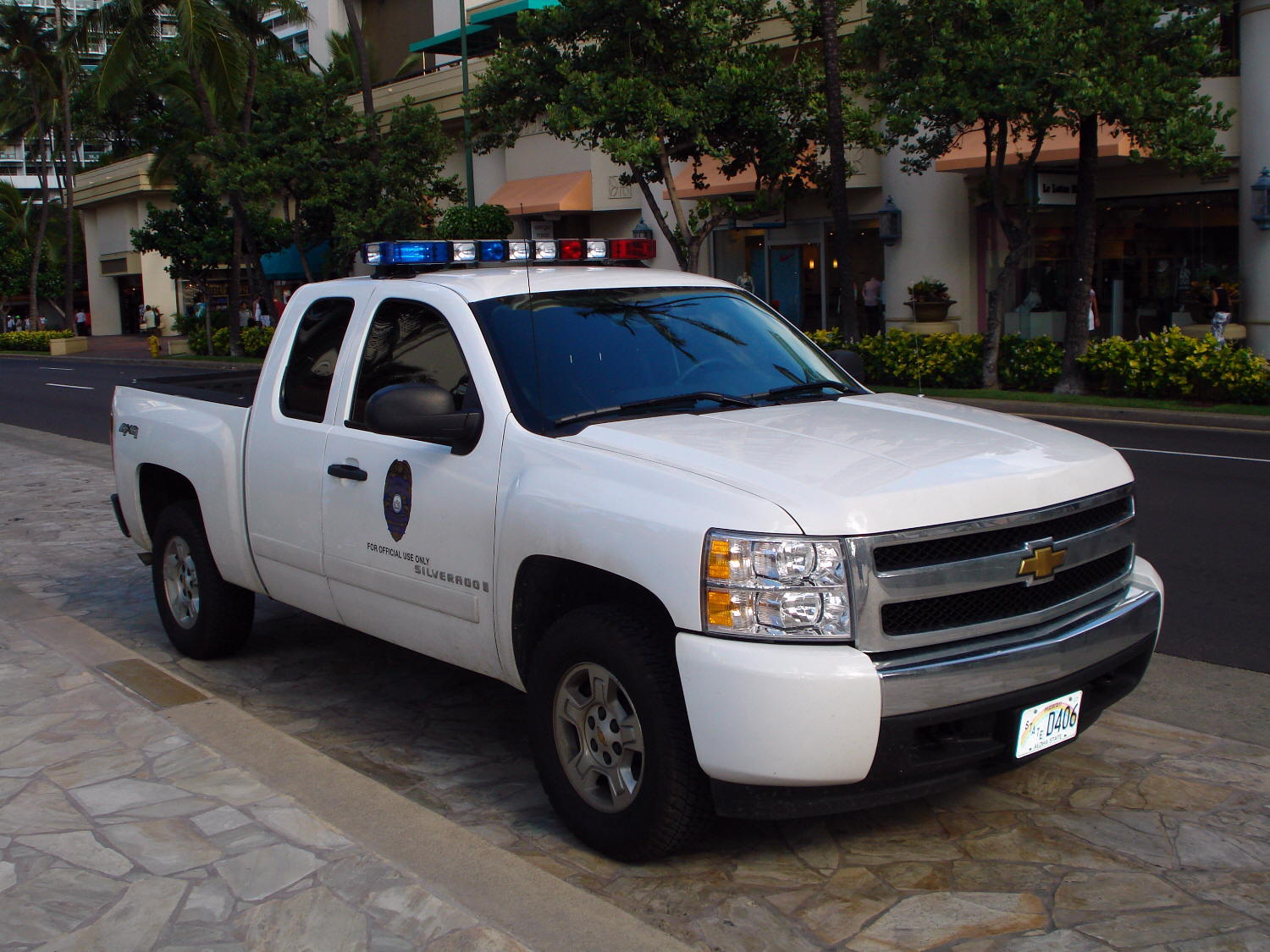
DLNR Patrol Vehicle

The Hawaii Division of Conservation and Resources Enforcement (DOCARE) and also known as the Hawaii DLNR Police, is the law enforcement agency for the Hawaii Department of Land and Natural Resources. It is tasked with full state police powers to enforces all State laws and Department rules, with primary jurisdiction involving State lands, State Parks, historical sites, forest reserves, aquatic life and wildlife areas, coastal zones, Conservation districts, State shores, as well as county ordinances involving county parks, for enforcing Hawaii's fishing and recreational boating laws and protecting reefs and other marine resources, patrolling harbors and coastal areas, and conducting marijuana eradication missions.

Officers patrol 3,000,000 acres (12,000 km^{2}) of state ocean waters, 3,200,000 acres (13,000 km^{2}) of state land or conservation land, and 750 miles (1,210 km) of coast line. Statewide, there are approximately 120 conservation officers divided among six islands.

== New programs & issues ==
DOCARE established Fisheries Enforcement Units in 2011, on Maui, Big Island and Kaua'i, that consist of one supervisory captain, two field officers to increase enforcement of Hawai'i's nearshore fisheries to increase sustainability. This will be financed by a joint-initiative between the state Department of Land and Natural Resources, Conservation International and the Harold K.L. Castle Foundation.

The Illegal hunting, fishing, and Koa theft top state enforcement concerns in 2010 on the Island of Kauai.

In 2010 DLNR Police had about 100 officers used to patrol from the mountains tops to 3 miles off shore. They also have 20 boats and 2 jet skis which are used statewide. The breakdown of Officers by island is: Oahu-42, Big Island-22, Maui County-22 and Kauai 14.

=== Controversy regarding shortage of enforcement officers to protect Hawaiian resources ===
In May 2011, William Aila, Director of the Department of Land and Natural Resources said, "eventually the department will need four times as many conservation officers as it does now to properly serve all the enforcement expectations of the department, which has jurisdiction over all state lands and the near-shore waters".

The Nature Conservancy of Hawai'i is among a long list of groups that have advocated for more DOCARE officers. Others are the Sierra Club, the Conservation Council for Hawai'i, KAHEA: The Hawaiian-Environmental Alliance, the Hawaii Audubon Society, the Pacific Fisheries Coalition and Malama Hawai'i. "It doesn't matter if it's from the conservation community, the fishing community or the recreational user community, there are not a lot of things we agree on, but there is one thing we agree on: We'd all like to see more capacity and a greater level of enforcement," said Mark Fox, director of external affairs for The Nature Conservancy. Maui fisherman Darrell Tanaka said, "many people engaged in illegal activities that contribute to overfishing don't worry about getting caught. Tanaka is part of a growing group of fishers who have become advocates for DOCARE and laws promoting sustainable fisheries".

=== New Holiday enforcement operations on Kaneohe sandbar ===
On 4-wheels, by boat and on foot - DLNR police officers were on patrol - enforcing new rules at the Kaneohe sandbar, including a ban on alcohol. In response to overcrowding and incidents involving drugs and alcohol at the sandbar, the state stepped in to keep the crowds calm. "We recognize this behavior can no longer be allowed to occur," said State Conservation Officer Randy Awo. State sheriffs, narcotics agents and Attorney General Investigators were also working double duty. "We'll do whatever we need to do to ensure compliance is being attained," said Awo. "We are taking this initiative very seriously."

=== Marijuana eradication ===
DLNR Police became actively involved in eradication for a number of reasons:

Safety and welfare of forest users like hunters, hikers, DLNR employees, researchers and flower gatherers is a priority for our Department. Hostile encounters and booby traps along with a variety of other criminal acts have been associated with the illegal cultivation of marijuana on State land, jail time ranges from 5 years to 20 years. Cultivation has the potential of destroying native habitat due to the introduction of herbicides, clear cutting, fertilizers, pesticides, rodenticide, alien species, and trash. This in turn has a direct negative impact on our fragile natural resources and disrupts sensitive wildlife species.

Large tracts of State land are being used for marijuana cultivation. Since much of this land is under the jurisdiction of DLNR, we have the primary responsibility to eradicate these plants.

It has been estimated that approximately 75% of all marijuana eradicated in Hawaii was found on DLNR land. More plants could and would be eradicated if adequate funding were available.

== See also ==
- Hawai'i Department of Land and Natural Resources
- Natural Area Reserves System Hawaii
- List of Hawaii state parks
- Government of Hawaii
