= Pollock, Louisiana =

Town of Pollock
- Town
- Motto: "Growing for the Future"
- Location of Pollock in Grant Parish, Louisiana.

- Location of Louisiana in the United States
- Coordinates: 31°30′24″N 92°26′18″W
- Country: United States
- State: Louisiana
- Parish: Grant

Area
  - Total: 7.86 sq mi (20.37 km^{2})
  - Land: 7.83 sq mi (20.29 km^{2})
  - Water: 0.031 sq mi (0.08 km^{2})
- Elevation: 174 ft (53 m)

Population (2020)
  - Total: 394
  - Rank: GR: 3rd
  - Density: 50.3/sq mi (19.41/km^{2})
- Time zone: UTC-6 (CST)
  - Summer (DST): UTC-5 (CDT)
- Area code: 318
- FIPS code: 22-61580
- GNIS feature ID: 2407142
- Website: www.pollockla.us

Pollock is a small town in Grant Parish, Louisiana, United States. It is part of the Alexandria, Louisiana Metropolitan Statistical Area. As of the 2020 census, Pollock had a population of 394.

== History ==
The town proper that sprang up in 1892 around a sawmill was named in honor of the manager of the Big Creek Sawmill and Lumber Company, Captain James W. Pollock.

Pollock was for many years a sundown town, a community that did not allow black people to be there after sundown. Historian Herbert Aptheker reported a sign "Niggers stay out of Pollock" at the town's boundary during World War II when he commanded a group of black soldiers nearby. The town's official history notes "the few individuals of African descent" living in the Pollock area left soon after the Colfax massacre. The Louisiana Almanac reported that as late as 1990, Pollock still had no black residents.

== Geography ==
Pollock is located in southeastern Grant Parish. U.S. Route 165 is the main highway through the town, leading north 16 miles (26 km) to Georgetown and south 16 miles to Alexandria. According to the United States Census Bureau, the town has a total area of 1.3 square miles (3.3 km^{2}), all land.

Pollock is within Kisatchie National Forest. Stuart Lake Recreational Area, part of the national forest, is 2.5 miles (4.0 km) southwest of the center of town.

== Demographics ==
Historical population
Census	Pop.	Note	%±
1900	637		—
1910	675		6.0%
1920	353		−47.7%
1930	376		6.5%
1940	317		−15.7%
1950	421		32.8%
1960	366		−13.1%
1970	341		−6.8%
1980	399		17.0%
1990	330		−17.3%
2000	376		13.9%
2010	469		24.7%
2020	394		−16.0%
2025 (est.)	393	▼	−0.3%
U.S. Decennial Census

As of the census of 2000, there were 376 people, 157 households, and 108 families residing in the town. The population density was 298.7 inhabitants per square mile (115.3/km^{2}). There were 204 housing units at an average density of 162.1 units per square mile (62.6 units/km^{2}). The racial makeup of the town was 97.87% White, 0.27% Native American, 0.53% Asian, and 1.33% from two or more races. Hispanic or Latino of any race were 1.86% of the population.

There were 157 households, out of which 36.9% had children under the age of 18 living with them, 48.4% were married couples living together, 18.5% had a female householder with no husband present, and 30.6% were non-families. 30.6% of all households were made up of individuals, and 15.9% had someone living alone who was 65 years of age or older. The average household size was 2.39 and the average family size was 2.98.

In the town, the population was spread out, with 28.5% under the age of 18, 7.7% from 18 to 24, 25.5% from 25 to 44, 22.6% from 45 to 64, and 15.7% who were 65 years of age or older. The median age was 38 years. For every 100 females, there were 91.8 males. For every 100 females age 18 and over, there were 83.0 males.

The median income for a household in the town was $25,625, and the median income for a family was $29,063. Males had a median income of $21,250 versus $28,125 for females. The per capita income for the town was $12,134. About 20.5% of families and 22.9% of the population were below the poverty line, including 33.3% of those under age 18 and 14.5% of those age 65 or over.

== Government and infrastructure ==
The Federal Correctional Complex, Pollock, consisting of the United States Penitentiary, Pollock and Federal Correctional Institution, Pollock, is located nearby.

== Education ==
Pollock residents are zoned to Grant Parish School Board schools.

== Notable people ==
- Henry E. Hardtner, timber magnate and Louisiana legislator
- Russ Springer, pitcher for 10 Major League baseball teams spanning 18 seasons from 1992 until 2010

== See also ==
- List of sundown towns in the United States
