= Federal Correctional Complex, Pollock =

US federal prison complex

Coordinates: 31.466°N 92.443°W

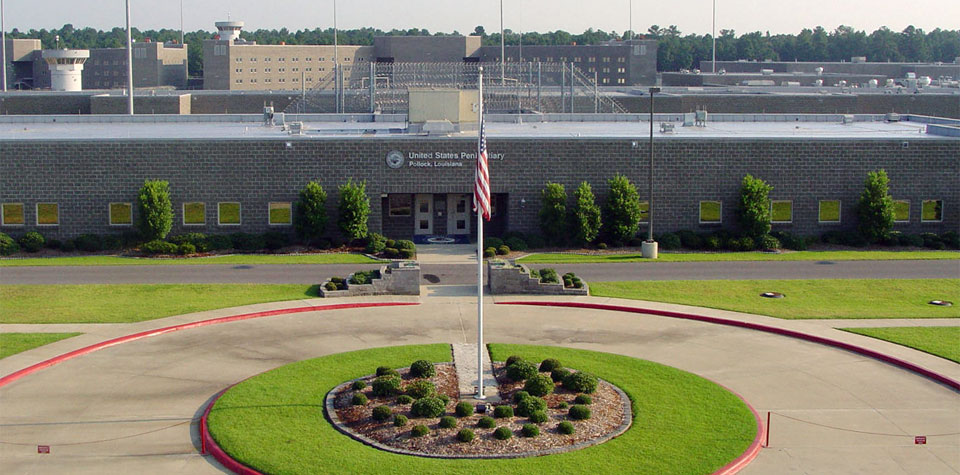
- Interactive map of Federal Correctional Complex, Pollock
- Location: Grant Parish, Louisiana
- Status: Operational
- Security class: High, medium and minimum-security
- Population: 3,200
- Managed by: Federal Bureau of Prisons

The Federal Correctional Complex, Pollock (FCC Pollock) is a United States federal prison complex for male inmates in unincorporated Grant Parish, Louisiana. It is run by the Federal Bureau of Prisons, a division of the United States Department of Justice, and consists of two facilities:

- Federal Correctional Institution, Pollock (FCI Pollock): a medium-security facility.
- United States Penitentiary, Pollock (USP Pollock): a high-security facility with an adjacent satellite prison camp for minimum-security inmates.

== See also ==
- List of U.S. federal prisons
- Federal Bureau of Prisons
- Incarceration in the United States
