= South East Multi-County Agency Narcotics Task Force (North Dakota) =

The South East Multi-County Agency Narcotics Task Force (SEMCA) is a multi-jurisdictional agency that provides policing services to Richland, Ransom and Sargent Counties in North Dakota and Wilkin County in Minnesota. The group does not maintain a web site and public documentation is scarce. Known members include:

- North Dakota Bureau of Criminal Investigations
- Ransom County Sheriff's Office
- Richland County Sheriff's Office
- Sargent County Sheriff Office (sic.)
- Breckenridge Police Department (Minnesota)
- Lisbon Police Department (North Dakota)
- Wahpeton Police Department (North Dakota)

The agency seems to handle about 150 cases a year.

SEMCA was implicated in the death of Andrew Sadek and sued by Sadek's parents in 2016.
