= North Dakota State Penitentiary =

Prison in North Dakota, United States

- Location in North Dakota
- Location: 3100 Railroad Avenue Bismarck, North Dakota; 46°48′14″N 100°45′00″W
- Status: open
- Security class: Maximum
- Capacity: 840
- Opened: 1884 (Rebuilt in 2013)
- Managed by: North Dakota Department of Corrections and Rehabilitation
- Director: Joey Joyce (Warden)

The North Dakota State Penitentiary is a part of the North Dakota Department of Corrections and Rehabilitation and is located in Bismarck, North Dakota. As of January 2013 the prison population stood at a record level of 1,550 inmates.

== Notable inmates ==
- Mohamed Noor, former Minneapolis police officer
- John Rooney, last man to be executed in North Dakota
