= United States Penitentiary, Pollock =

High-security United States prison in Louisiana

Coordinates: 31°28′00″N 92°26′30″W

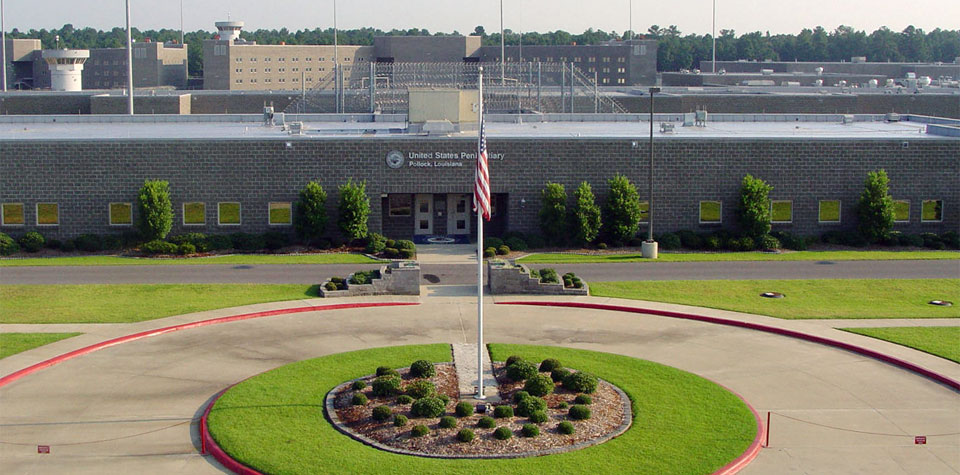
- Interactive map of United States Penitentiary, Pollock
- Location: Grant Parish near Pollock, Louisiana
- Status: Operational
- Security class: High-security (with minimum-security prison camp)
- Capacity: 1,218 [1,067 at the USP, 151 in prison camp] (September 2023)
- Opened: 2000
- Managed by: Federal Bureau of Prisons

The United States Penitentiary, Pollock (USP Pollock) is a high-security United States federal prison for male inmates in unincorporated Grant Parish, Louisiana. It is part of the Pollock Federal Correctional Complex (FCC Pollock) and operated by the Federal Bureau of Prisons, a division of the United States Department of Justice. The facility also has an adjacent satellite prison camp for minimum-security male offenders.

FCC Pollock is located in central Louisiana, approximately 15 miles north of Alexandria.

== Notable incidents ==
=== 2001 murder ===
On December 14, 2001, USP Pollock had its first homicide when 71-year-old John MacLeod was found unresponsive in a cell in the Special Housing Unit (SHU). MacLeod was serving a 235-month sentence for kidnapping and child phonography charges. MacLeod's cause of death was determined to be asphyxiation due to a ligature around his neck and severe facial trauma. MacLeod's cellmate, Ishmael Petty was then indicted for the murder. Petty was serving a lengthy sentence for bank robbery issued in 1998. In 2002, he would be sentenced to life in prison for the murder of MacLeod. In 2025, Petty would be charged with the murder of another inmate, this time at the federal supermax prison in Florence, Colorado.

=== 2006 escape ===
On April 5, 2006, convicted murderer Richard Lee McNair escaped from USP Pollock. McNair's duties in prison included work in a manufacturing area, where he repaired old, torn mailbags. He held this position for several months, during which he plotted his escape. McNair escaped by constructing an "escape pod," which included a breathing tube, and burying it under a pile of outgoing mailbags. At approximately 9:45 AM, prison staff placed the mailbags on a pallet, transported it to a nearby warehouse outside the prison's perimeter fence, and went for lunch. McNair then cut himself out of the pod and escaped at 11:00 AM. Having observed prison operations and the times when prisoner counts were conducted, McNair knew that his absence would not be discovered until 4:00 PM. After an over yearlong manhunt, McNair was captured in New Brunswick, Canada by the Royal Canadian Mounted Police on Oct. 25, 2007 after being featured on the television program America's Most Wanted. Since McNair had previously escaped from a county jail and a state prison in North Dakota in 1987 and 1992, he was classified as a high-escape risk and transferred to the United States Penitentiary, Florence ADX, the federal supermax prison in Colorado which holds inmates requiring the tightest controls.

=== 2007 inmate murder ===
In November 2007, inmate William Anthony Bullock was stabbed to death with a shank during an altercation with another inmate, identified as Shaun Wayne Williams. Williams had crafted the shank from a part of a cell locker. Williams, who was serving a 98-month sentence for being a felon in possession of a firearm, was convicted of voluntary manslaughter in 2009 and sentenced to an additional 15 years in prison. Williams (40542-050) was then incarcerated at USP Big Sandy and was released October 27, 2023

Inmate Steven Prater, who was serving a 51-month sentence for being a felon in possession of a firearm, was fatally injured during a fight with another inmate on June 24, 2010. On January 18, 2010, inmate Carlton Coltrane was stabbed to death by another inmate. Coltrane's mother told The Washington Post that her son, who was serving a sentence for bank robbery, told her several days before that there were running disputes between gangs of inmates from Louisiana and the Washington, DC area. The murders of Prater and Coltrane remain under investigation.

== Notable Inmates ==
=== Current ===
Inmate Name	Register Number	Status	Details
Khalid Ali-M Aldawsari	42771-177	Serving a life sentence	Serving a life sentence for a foiled bomb plot targeting former president George W. Bush and his Dallas, Texas residence.
Ricky Mungia	26372-077	Serving a life sentence	Sentenced in 1996 for a racially charged attack and carrying unregistered guns
Dawayne Brown	32909-016	Now at USP Atwater. Scheduled for release on December 2, 2025.	Attempted assault with a deadly weapon.
Mohammed Khalifa	67830-509	Serving a life sentence	Pleaded guilty to conspiracy to support Islamic State
James Edward Rose	10820-007	Serving a life sentence.	Found guilty of attempted murder after stabbing correctional officers at USP McCreary during a routine cell check.
James Rosemond	17903-054	Serving a life sentence.	Convicted for hiring a hitman on Lodi Mack as payback for him and Tony Yayo assaulting his son.
Félix Verdejo	51145-069	Serving a life sentence.	Convicted for the kidnapping and murder of his pregnant mistress

=== Former ===
Inmate Name	Register Number	Status	Details
Chimene Hamilton Onyeri	79217-380	Transferred to USP Florence High. Serving a life sentence.	Serving life for attempted assassination of Texas judge Julie Kocurek after she sentenced him for running a tax refund scam.
Richard Lee McNair	13829-045	Transferred to ADX Florence and then to USP Florence High. Serving two consecutive life sentences on a state murder charge from North Dakota in 1987.	Murderer from North Dakota sentenced to 2 life sentences, escaped in 2006.

== See also ==
- List of U.S. federal prisons
- Federal Bureau of Prisons
- Incarceration in the United States
