= Eagle Lake Tramway =

- Tramway Historic District
- U.S. National Register of Historic Places
- U.S. Historic district
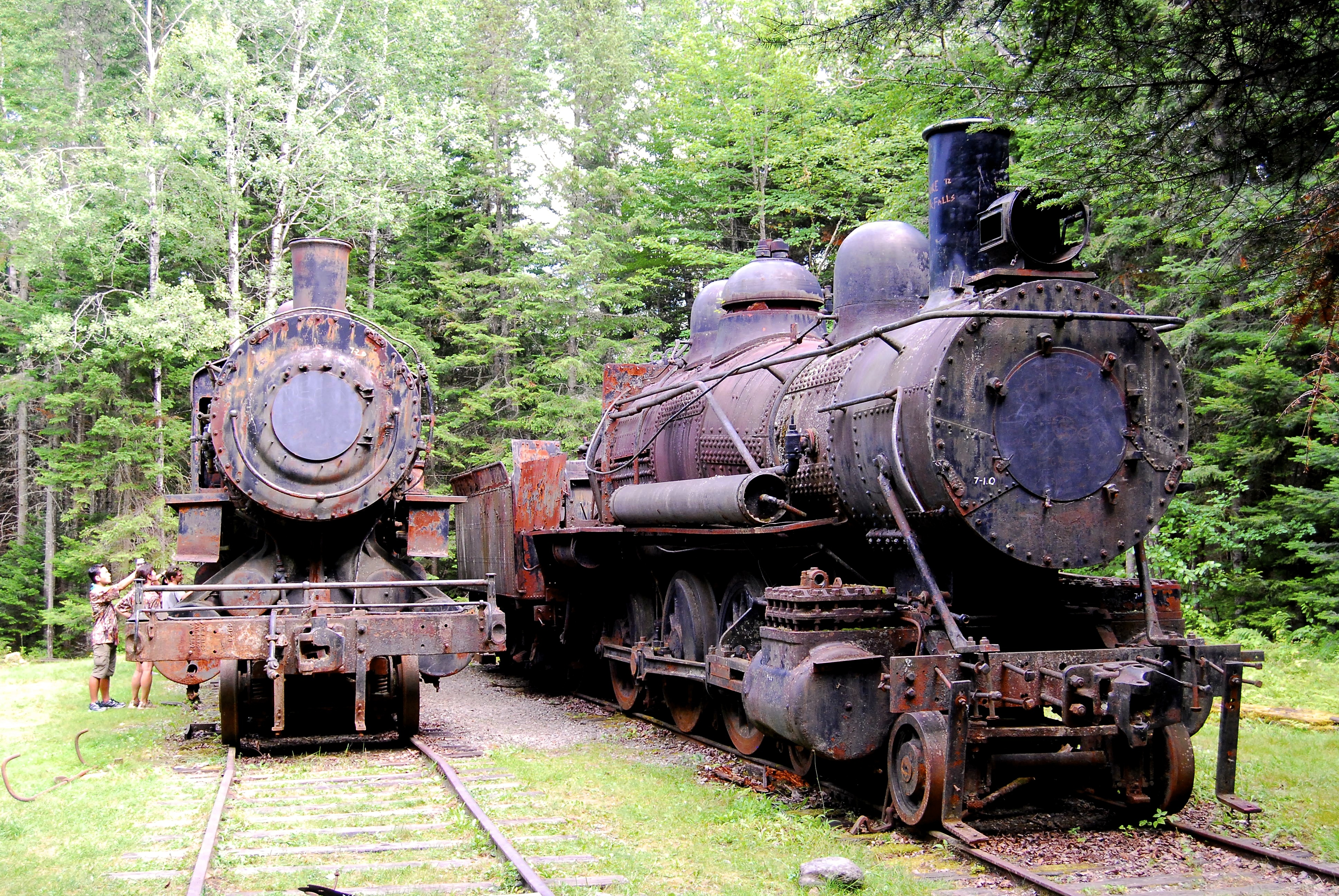
- Locomotives of the Eagle Lake and West Branch Railroad

- Location within Maine Location within the United States
- Nearest city: Greenville, Maine
- Coordinates: 46°19′10″N 69°22′39″W
- Area: 70 acres (28 ha)
- Built: 1902
- NRHP reference No.: 79000164
- Added to NRHP: May 7, 1979

The Eagle Lake Tramway is a historic timber-transport mechanism in the remote North Maine Woods in northeastern USA. The tramway, built in 1902 and operated until 1907, transported timber across a neck of land between Eagle Lake and Chamberlain Lake, with one end eventually becoming the eastern terminus of the Eagle Lake and West Branch Railroad in 1927. The remnants of the tramway and rail station were listed on the National Register of Historic Places as the Tramway Historic District in 1979. The tramway is part of the Allagash Wilderness Waterway, a Maine state park.

== Description and history ==
The remote northern interior of Maine was in the 19th-century developed as a major logging region. Because the provincial government of New Brunswick began charging tariffs for timber floated down the Saint John River, American logging interest sought ways to divert timber into the Penobscot River watershed. This was accomplished by the placement of dams in a number of places on Chamberlain Lake and Eagle Lake, whose waters historically reached the Saint John via the Allagash River, which resulted in their waters' diversion toward Webster Lake (now in the far north of Baxter State Park), part of the Penobscot watershed. By the late 19th century the lock dam between Chamberlain and Eagle Lakes had become a hindrance to logging operations.

To speed the movement of timbers between the two lakes, the ingenious solution of a cable-drawn steam-powered tramway was implemented. At a neck of land about 3 miles (4.8 km) north of the dam, a pair of tracks was laid across the neck (about 3,000 feet (910 m)), and a continuous wire cable loop 6,000 feet (1,800 m) in length was attached to lumber-carrying trucks. The tramway was powered by large steam boilers located at the Chamberlain Lake end, and was capable of transporting logs at 250 feet (76 m) per minute, averaging more than 500,000 board-feet of lumber over a typical working day. The tramway was rendered obsolete by the invention of the Lombard Steam Log Hauler, and ceased operation in 1907. Prior to the tramway, oxen hauled wood between Eagle and Chamberlain Lakes.

In 1927 the Eagle Lake end of the tramway was adapted as the eastern terminus of the Eagle Lake and West Branch Railroad, a freight-only operation for hauling timber southward. The railroad operated until 1933; the only major surviving element of its operation are two locomotives, which are vandal-stripped and exposed to the elements. Of the tramway, the cable and elements of its tracks survive, collapsing into the ground as the ties deteriorate, and elements of the steam power plant remain at Chamberlain Lake.

The area is now part of the Allagash Wilderness Waterway, a Maine state park.

In 2012, part of the tramway was restored by volunteers.

== See also ==
- National Register of Historic Places listings in Piscataquis County, Maine
