= Eagle Lake and West Branch Railroad =

Former logging railway, Maine, U.S. (1927–33)

Coordinates: 46.3223°N 69.3750°W

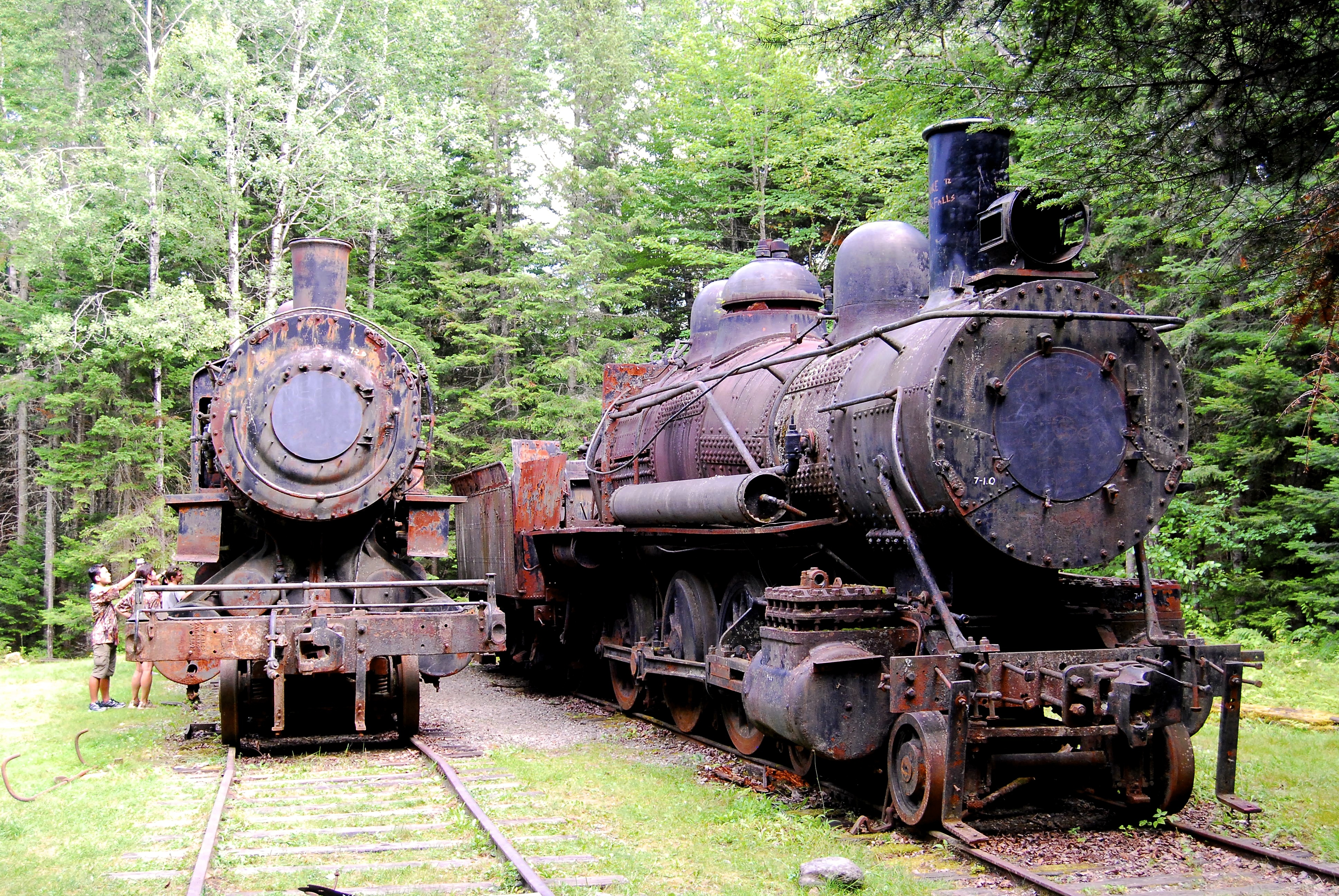
- Abandoned Eagle Lake and West Branch Railroad locomotives

Overview
- Locale: North Maine Woods region, Penobscot County and Piscataquis County; Maine
- Dates of operation: 1927–1933

Technical
- Track gauge: 4 ft 8 1/2 in (1,435 mm) standard gauge
- Length: 13 miles (21 km)

The Eagle Lake and West Branch Railroad was a forest railway built to transfer pulpwood between drainage basins in the North Maine Woods. The railroad operated only a few years in a location so remote the steam locomotives were never scrapped and remain exposed to the elements at the site of the Eagle Lake Tramway. Its tracks were located in Penobscot County and Piscataquis County. The site of the railroad switch and the two locomotives are popularly known as the 'ghost trains'; they are the only two locomotives in any direction for over 100 miles.

== History ==
Spruce forests of the Maine North Woods were a source of pulpwood throughout the 20th century. Trees were bucked into 4-foot (1.2-meter) lengths and loaded onto sleds towed by draft animals or log haulers to the nearest river or lake. Log drives would float the pulpwood logs to a downstream paper mill when the snow and ice melted. Pulpwood harvested in the upper Allagash River drainage was destined for Great Northern Paper Company paper mill on the West Branch Penobscot River in Millinocket. The problem was getting the pulpwood out of the north-flowing Allagash River into the east-flowing Penobscot River.

=== Eagle Lake and West Branch Railroad ===
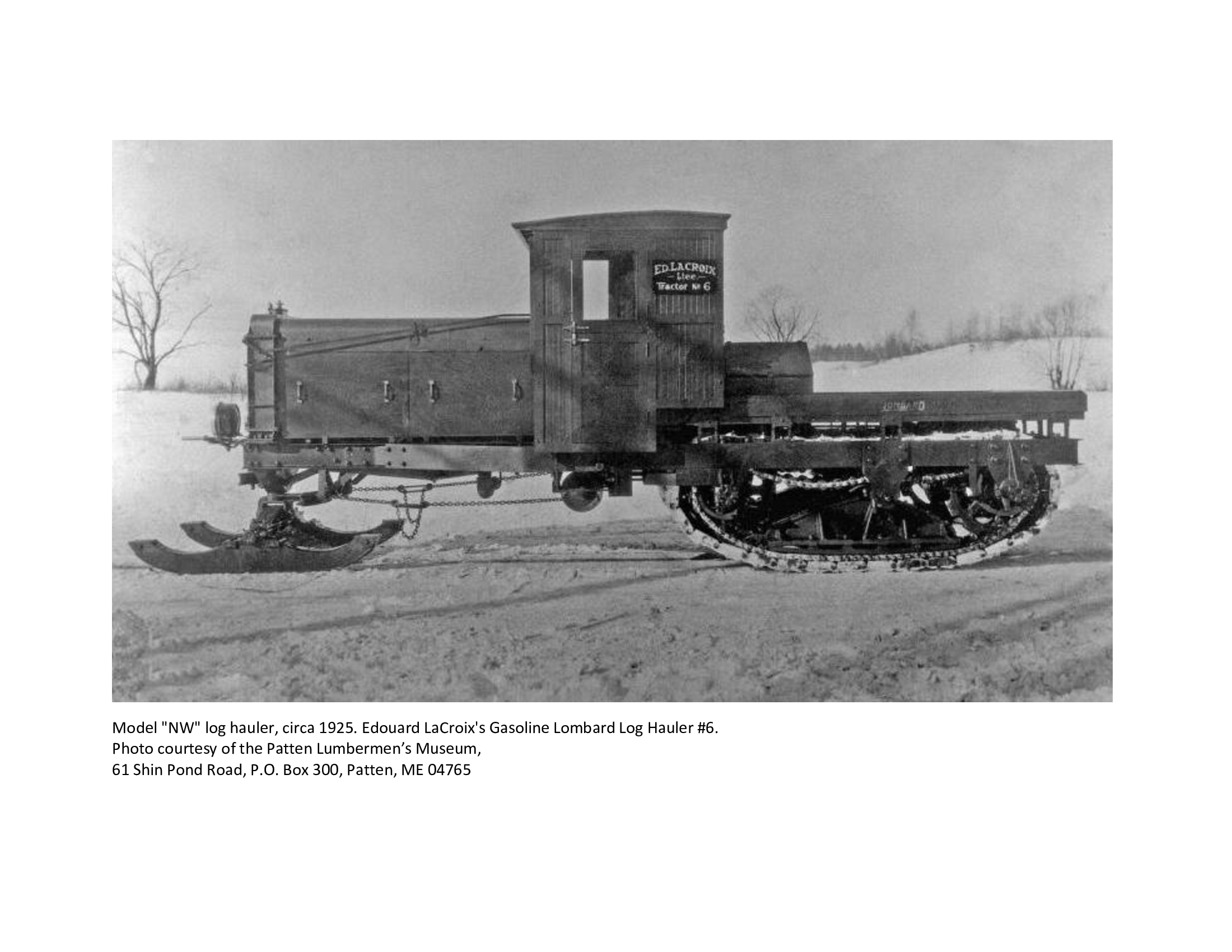
One of the log haulers used to transport railroad equipment

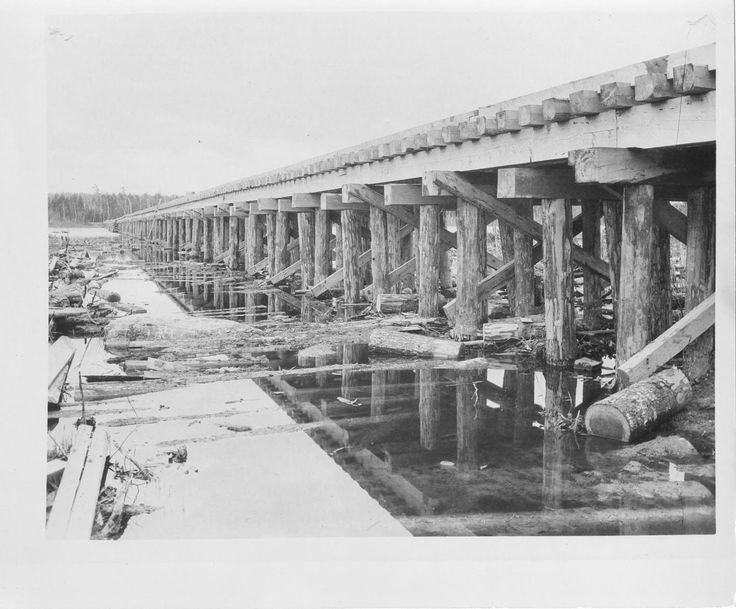
Trestle north of Chamberlain lake.

During the winter of 1926–27, Édouard Lacroix's Madawaska Company used log haulers to move heavy railway equipment overland from Lac-Frontière, Quebec to Churchill Depot and then over frozen old Eastern Manufacturing’s 9-14 haul road to Eagle Lake. The log haulers delivered one steam locomotive, two Plymouth gasoline-powered switchers, miles of steel rail, and forty five railroad cars for carrying pulpwood. Each railroad car was 32 feet (9.8 m) long with high, slatted sides to hold 12 cords of pulpwood. Three diesel-powered conveyors were built to lift pulpwood logs from Eagle Lake to a height of 25 feet (7.6 m) over a distance of 225 feet (69 m). Each conveyor could fill a railroad car in 18 minutes. Lacroix completed the railroad to a pulpwood-unloading trestle at the north end of Umbazooksus Lake. Lacroix's railroad included a 1,500-foot (460 m) long trestle across the north end of Chamberlain Lake. From June 1st 1927, the rails were laid out to bring gravel for ballasting until the railroad was brought in operation on August 1st 1927.

=== Operations ===
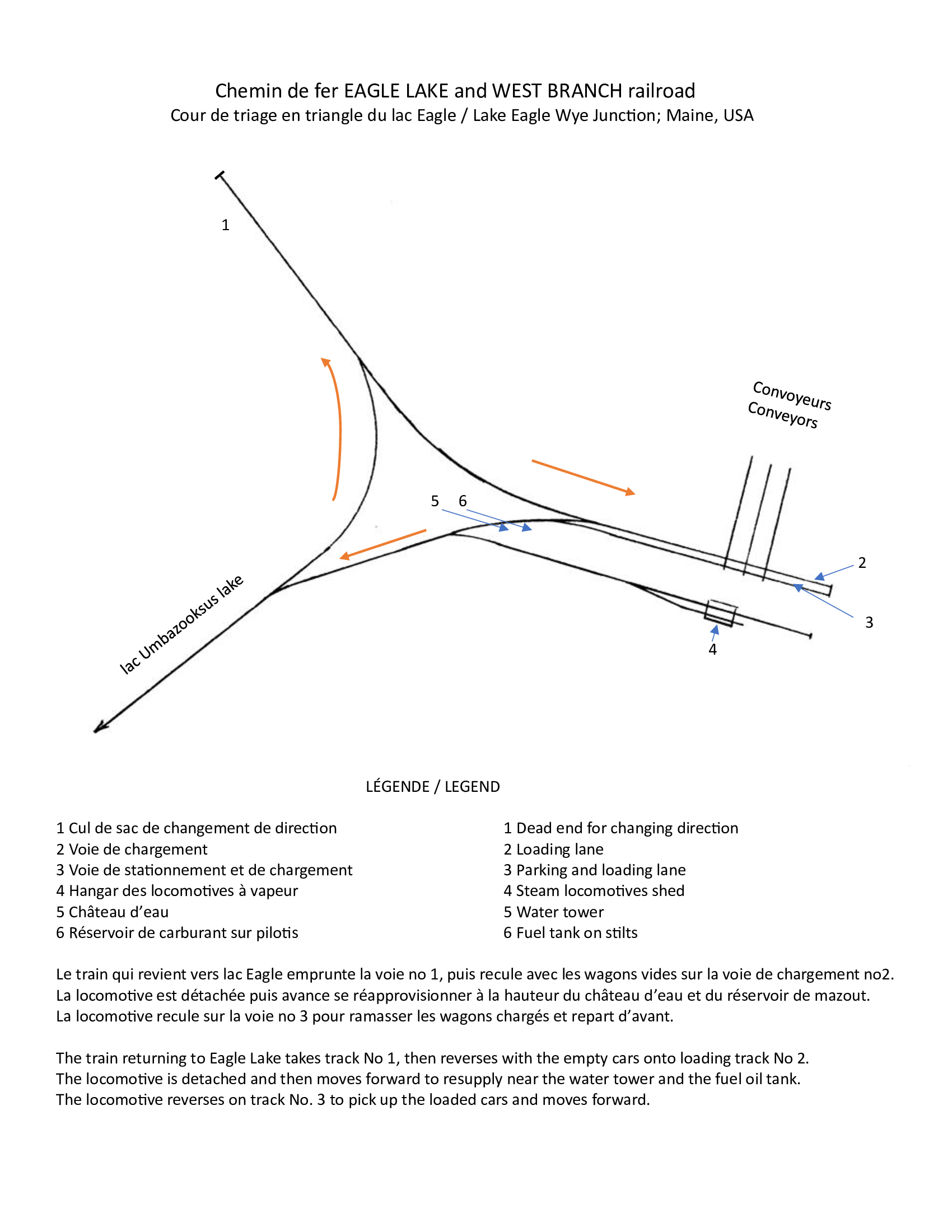
Eagle lake wye yard.

At first, routine operations were carried out twenty-four hours a day, with three trains of ten cars towed by the steam locomotive. While the steam locomotive moved a train loaded with wood, a second string of empty cars was being loaded by conveyor at Eagle Lake, and a third string of cars was being unloaded at the Umbazooksus Lake landing stage. The steam locomotive number 1 purchased in 1927 had been built 1897, and was in poor condition which limited the length of trains. Operations were stopped for a week while all the workers ballasted the tracks to reduce the number of derailments which stalled early operations. Operations resumed with a workday reduced to 15 hours or at least 5 trips. A more powerful steam locomotive number 2 was transported to the site in March 1928. Steam locomotive number 1 was placed in standby service used only when number 2 or one of the switchers required repairs. Steam locomotive number 2 could easily tow fifteen loaded cars with a round trip taking about 3 hours. One Plymouth switcher shunted loading cars at Eagle Lake and the other shunted unloading cars at Umbazooksus Lake. The inland rail of the 600-foot (180 m) long pulpwood-unloading pier was six inches (15 cm) higher than the lakeside rail to expedite unloading. The floor of each pulpwood car sloped 12 inches (30 cm) to the unloading side; and the slatted side of the car was hinged at the top to swing open when latches were released so the pulpwood would slide out of the car into Umbazooksus Lake. Bark breaking off the pulpwood logs accumulated so the Plymouth switcher periodically dragged a rake adjacent to the pier to keep the water deep enough to float the pulpwood logs being dumped. Normal operations transferred 6,500 cords of pulpwood per week enabling Great Northern Paper Company to manufacture approximately one-fifth of the United States' annual paper production.

Petroleum products to fuel wood conveyors, switchers and steam locomotives represented a significant part of the supplies necessary for the operation of the railway. The locomotives consumed 950,000 liters of fuel oil per season from June to November. Through the winter months on iced roads, Lacroix transported the fuel oil from Lac Frontière, Canada, to twelve tanks at Eagle Lake for use the following summer. To prevent the American petroleum companies from complaining about it, the Great Northern company purchased another Plymouth switcher with about ten flat cars and built a 5 mile (8 km) branch line south of the railway, which required no great cuts nor fills; it was not intended for the transport of wood, but to transport supplies from Greenville, Maine. From there, the supplies were transported over 45 miles of road, and then across Chesuncook Lake on the side-wheel steamboat A. B. Smith. Great Northern Paper Company named the branch line Chesuncook and Chamberlain Lake Railroad which ran from the steam boat landing at the north end of Chesuncook Lake along the eastern shore of Umbazooksus Lake to the pulpwood unloading pier at the north end of Umbazooksus Lake. Drums of petroleum products to fuel the pulpwood conveyors, switchers and steam locomotives became a major freight commodity over Chesuncook Lake.

=== Demise ===
Paper demand declined through the Great Depression until pulpwood transfer ceased in 1933 after the railroad had carried nearly a million cords of pulpwood. The Plymouth switchers found work elsewhere while the steam locomotives waited in the engine house for improved economic conditions. Great Northern found trucks more cost effective than restoring the railroad when business returned following World War II. The trestle gradually collapsed into Chamberlain Lake, but Maine Forest Service employees continued using a motor vehicle over the two miles of track between Eagle Lake and Chamberlain Lake.

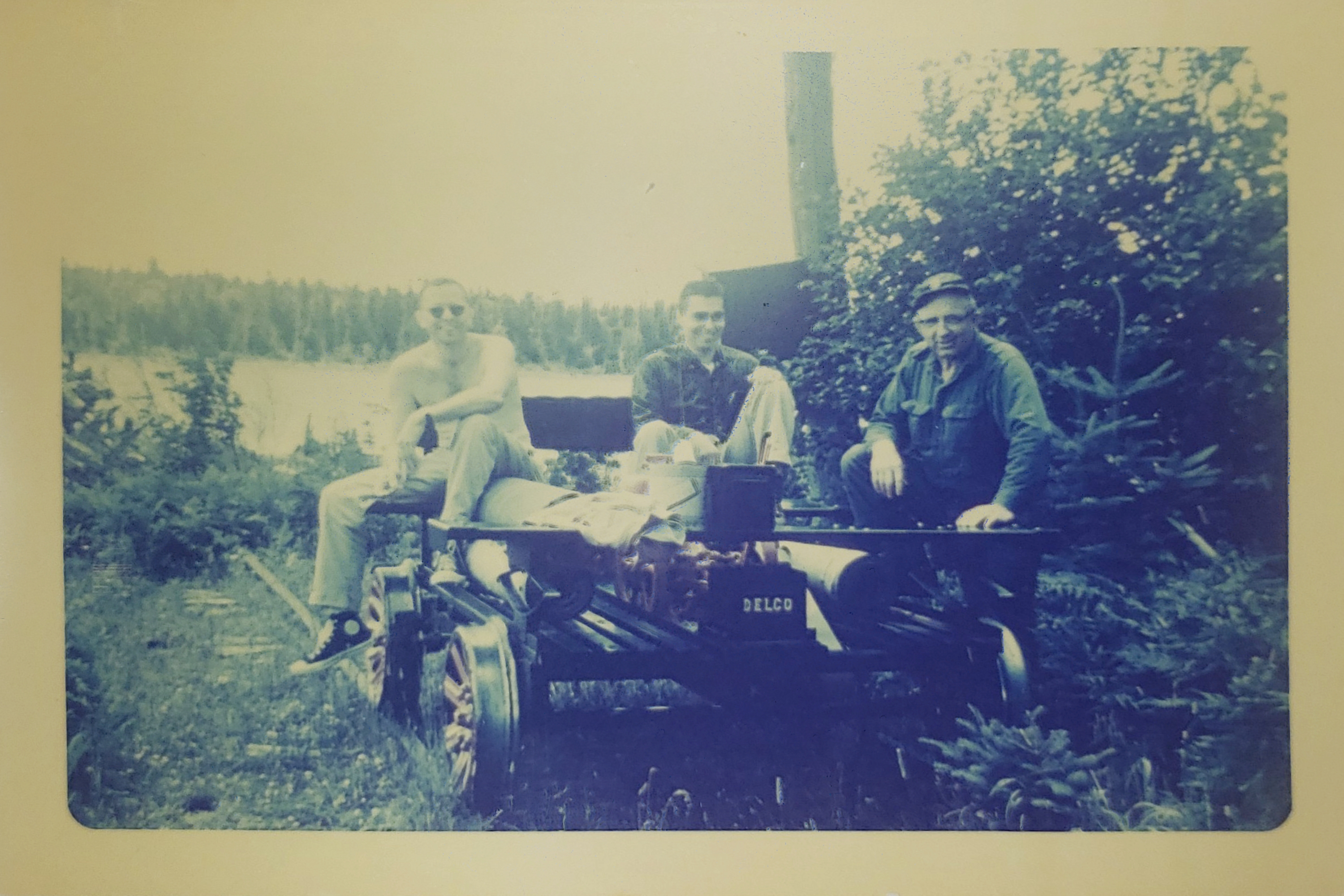
A Maine guide and his colleagues

The engine house became a popular snowmobile destination in the 1960s; and fittings like gauges, bells, headlights, and number plates began to disappear from the locomotives before the wooden cab of engine #1 was destroyed when the engine house burned in 1969. The State of Maine (which took possession of the Allagash Waterway region in 1966) decided to destroy the old buildings for safety reasons and to maintain the natural appearance. In 1969, the Maine Forest Service was ordered to relocate its headquarters and destroy its Forest House and associated buildings in the Tramway area; the employee in charge of the work understood that all the buildings had to be burned, which he did, including the locomotive shed and probably the trestle (which burned at this time). The locomotive boiler jackets and asbestos lagging were removed in 1995 but the stripped locomotive shells remain a unique reminder of the industrial revolution in the Maine North Woods.

In 2012, during a minor restoration effort by volunteers, the railroad locomotives were lifted and put back onto railroad tracks.

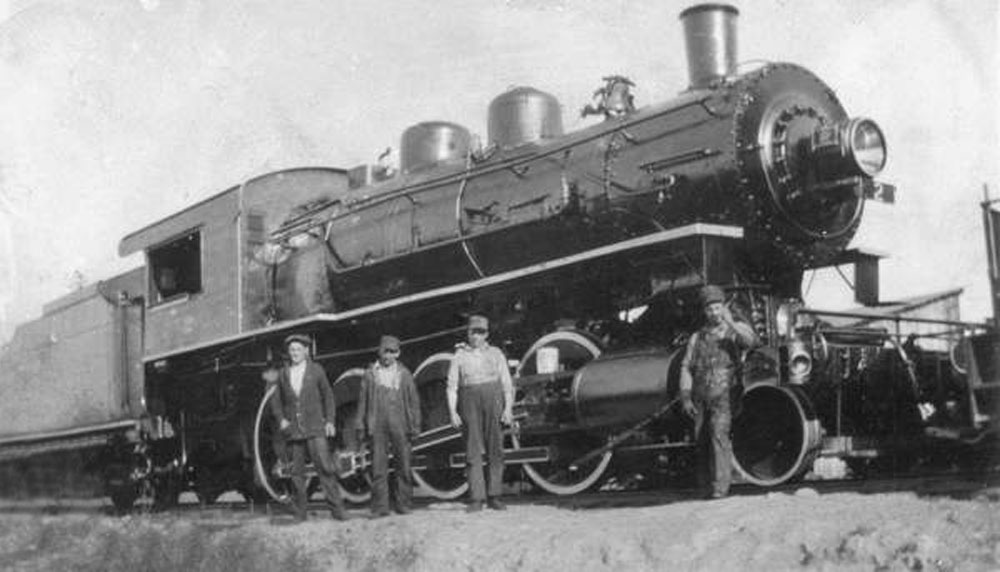
Eagle Lake and West Branch Railroad Consolidation locomotive #2 in operation

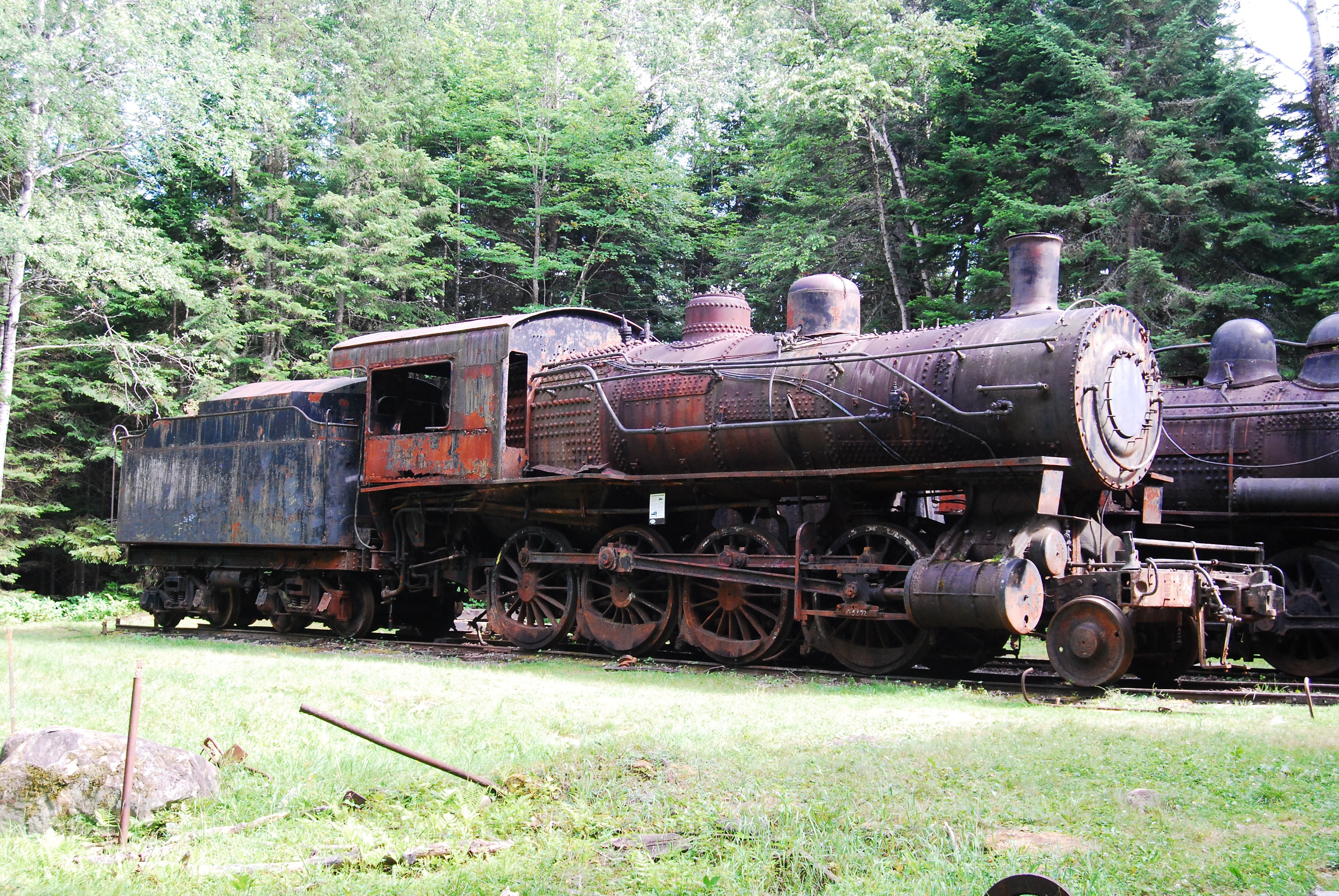
Eagle Lake and West Branch Railroad locomotive #2, abandoned in the North Maine Woods.

== Locomotives ==
Number	Builder	Type	Date	Works number	Notes
1	Schenectady Locomotive Works	4-6-0	1897	4553	former New York Central Railroad (NYC) #63 class F53 built as Chicago Junction Railway #109; became Indiana Harbor Belt Railroad #109 in 1907, later #115
2	Brooks Locomotive Works	2-8-0	1901	4062	former NYC #26 class G43a built as Lake Shore and Michigan Southern Railway #780, later #5780
