= Brown River (Québec–Maine) =

River in Maine, United States and Quebec, Canada

Coordinates: 46°55′25″N 69°37′48″W

The Brown River (French: rivière Brown) is a tributary of the Depot River, flowing in Quebec, Canada, in the municipality of Saint-Adalbert, in L'Islet Regional County Municipality, in the administrative region of Chaudière-Appalaches, and in Aroostook County, Maine, United States, in Township T13 R16 Wels, in the North Maine Woods. Its course runs entirely through forested region in a plain in Quebec and in a valley south of the Canada-US border.

The upper hydrographic watershed of the Brown River is accessible in Quebec by the road of 5th range West, Route 204 West, Bélanger Road and 8th range West. The segment flowing in Maine is accessible by forest roads along the Depot River.

== Geography ==
The source of the river Brown begins with a mountain stream in Saint-Adalbert, Quebec. This source is located at:

- 5.6 kilometres (3.5 mi) at Northwest of the border between Quebec and Maine;
- 1.5 kilometres (0.93 mi) at Northwest from the village center of Saint-Adalbert, Quebec;
- 8.6 kilometres (5.3 mi) at Southwest of the confluence of the "River Brown".

From its source, "Brown River" flows over 11.2 kilometres (7.0 mi) as follows:

River Brown Headwaters (segment of 8.2 kilometres (5.1 mi) flowing in Quebec)

- 2.7 kilometres (1.7 mi) to the South in Saint-Adalbert, Quebec, forming a curve to the west, until the route 204;
- 2.2 kilometres (1.4 mi) Eastward passing at the North of the "Bellevue Mountain" up to the road of the Mountain;
- 1.9 kilometres (1.2 mi) to the Southeast, up to the road of 8th range West;
- 1.4 kilometres (0.87 mi) to the Southeast, up to the Canada-US border.

Lower river courses Brown (segment de 3.0 kilometres (1.9 mi) flowing in the Maine)

- 3.0 kilometres (1.9 mi) to the southeast in a small valley basin, then in a plain to the confluence of the river.

This confluence is located:

- 2.5 kilometres (1.6 mi) to the southeast of the Canada-US border;
- 37.8 kilometres (23.5 mi) to the Southwest of the confluence of the Big Black River (Saint John River).

"The River Brown" pours on the west bank of the Depot River which flows North, South East and North again, up to the Big Black River (Saint John River) (French: Grande rivière Noire), in Aroostook County. The latter flows Northeast zigzagging up to a river bend of Saint John River where it pours on the West bank. It flows to the East, then Southeast through all the New Brunswick and pours on the North bank of the Bay of Fundy which opens to the Southwest on the Atlantic Ocean.

== Toponymy ==
The place name "rivière Brown" (French: "Brown River") was formalized on December 5, 1968, at the Commission de toponymie du Québec (Quebec Places Names Board).

== See also ==
- Saint-Adalbert, Quebec, a municipality of Quebec
- L'Islet Regional County Municipality, an RCM in Quebec
- Aroostook County, a county in Maine
- Depot River, one of the rivers in Maine
- Big Black River (Saint John River), a stream
- Saint John River (Bay of Fundy), a stream
- North Maine Woods, a geographical region of Maine
- List of rivers of Quebec
- List of rivers of Maine

== Bibliography ==
- "Brown Stream". Geographic Names Information System. United States Geological Survey, United States Department of the Interior. September 30, 1980.
