= Gobeil River =

River in Canada and United States

Physical characteristics
- Source
  - location: Sainte-Félicité, Chaudière-Appalaches, Quebec (Garneau township), L'Islet Regional County Municipality, Chaudière-Appalaches, Quebec, Canada
  - coordinates: 47°00′12″N 69°54′55″W
  - elevation: 408 metres (1,339 ft)
- Mouth
  - location: Big Black River (Saint John River) (said « Grande Rivière Noire » in Québec), Aroostook County, North Maine Woods, Maine, United States
  - coordinates: 46°53′50″N 69°45′50″W
  - elevation: 272 metres (892 ft)
- Length: 17.7 km (11.0 mi)

The Gobeil River is a tributary of the Big Black River (Saint John River), flowing through:

- the municipalities of Sainte-Félicité, Chaudière-Appalaches, Quebec and Saint-Pamphile, Quebec in L'Islet Regional County Municipality, in the administrative region of Chaudière-Appalaches, south of Quebec, in Canada;
- Aroostook County, North Maine Woods, Maine, in United States.

The upper part of the sub-catchment of the "River Gobeil" is accessible by route 216; other parties in the Quebec by the road of Rang Saint-Camille, the Rosario route, the road of the rank of Moreau and road of Double rank.

== Hydrography ==
The "River Gobeil" rises to the Northwest of the route 216, in the canton of Garneau in the Northeastern part of the municipality of Sainte-Félicité, Chaudière-Appalaches, Quebec. This source is located at:

- 4.8 kilometres (3.0 mi) Northeast from the village of Sainte-Félicité, Chaudière-Appalaches, Quebec;
- 11.1 kilometres (6.9 mi) Northwest from the village center of Saint-Pamphile, Quebec;
- 6.4 kilometres (4.0 mi) South of the village center of Sainte-Perpétue, Chaudière-Appalaches, Quebec;
- 13.8 kilometres (8.6 mi) in the Northwest of the Canada-US border;
- 32.7 kilometres (20.3 mi) Southeast of Southeast coast of St. Lawrence River.

From its source, the "River Gobeil" flows over 17.7 kilometres (11.0 mi), according to the following segments:

Higher Courses of the river Gobeil (flowing in Quebec on 14.9 kilometres (9.3 mi))

- 1.0 kilometre (0.62 mi) to the Southeast in Sainte-Félicité, Chaudière-Appalaches, Quebec up to the "route principale" (Main road) (route 216) that it has cut 4.6 kilometres (2.9 mi) Northeast of the village center;
- 1.8 kilometres (1.1 mi) to the Southeast, up to the limit of Casgrain Township;
- 1.7 kilometres (1.1 mi) to the Southeast in the Casgrain Township, up to the road of Saint-Camille rank;
- 1.7 kilometres (1.1 mi) to the Southeast, up to the limit of Saint-Pamphile, Quebec;
- 2.0 kilometres (1.2 mi) to the Southeast, up to the road of the row of Moreau;
- 3.3 kilometres (2.1 mi) to the Southeast, up to the road of Double row, or at a place called "Gobeil";
- 1.5 kilometres (0.93 mi) to the Southeast, up to road of Single row (French: rang simple);
- 1.9 kilometres (1.2 mi) to the South-East, up to the Canada-US border;

Lower course of the river Gobeil (flowing at Maine on 2.8 kilometres (1.7 mi))

- 2.8 kilometres (1.7 mi) to the Southeast in the Aroostook County, to the confluence of the river

River Gobeil empties into a river bend on the North bank of the Big Black River (Saint John River) in the Township T14 R16 WELS in Aroostook County in Maine, the United States.

This confluence is located:

- 11.6 kilometres (7.2 mi) Northeast of the village center of Saint-Adalbert, Quebec;
- 6.9 kilometres (4.3 mi) South of the village center of Saint-Pamphile, Quebec;
- 2.1 kilometres (1.3 mi) to the southeast of the US border (Quebec-Maine).

From the confluence of the "River Gobeil," the Big Black River (Saint John River) flows Southeast and East to the West bank of Saint John River. The latest flows to the East then to Northeast, crossing the Maine, then East and Southeast through the New Brunswick. Finally, the current flows on the North bank of the Bay of Fundy which opens to the Southwest on the Atlantic Ocean.

== Toponymy ==
The term "Gobeil" is a French original family surname.

The toponym "Gobeil River" was formalized on December 5, 1968, at the Commission de toponymie du Québec (Quebec Places Names Board).

== Notes ==
=== See also ===
Media related to Category: Gobeil River at Wikimedia Commons

- Sainte-Félicité, Chaudière-Appalaches, Quebec, a Quebec municipality
- Saint-Pamphile, Quebec, a Quebec municipality
- L'Islet Regional County Municipality
- Aroostook County, a county Maine
- Big Black River (Saint John River), a stream
- Saint John River (Bay of Fundy)
- List of rivers of Quebec
- List of rivers of Maine
