= Little Saint Roch River =

Location
- Country: Canada, United States

Physical characteristics
- Source
  - location: Quebec
- Mouth
  - location: Shields Branch Big Black River
  - elevation: 865 feet (260 m)

The Little Saint Roch River (French: Rivière du Rochu) is a river in Quebec and Maine. From its source (47°07′05″N 69°44′56″W), in L'Islet RCM, the river runs south and southeast across the Canada–United States border to the Shields Branch of the Big Black River in Maine Township 15, Range 15, WELS.

== See also ==
- List of rivers of Maine

== Bibliography ==
- "Little Saint Roch River". Geographic Names Information System. United States Geological Survey, United States Department of the Interior. 30 September 1980.
- Maine Streamflow Data from the USGS
- Maine Watershed Data From Environmental Protection Agency
