= Saint Pamphile Border Crossing =

Canada–United States border crossing

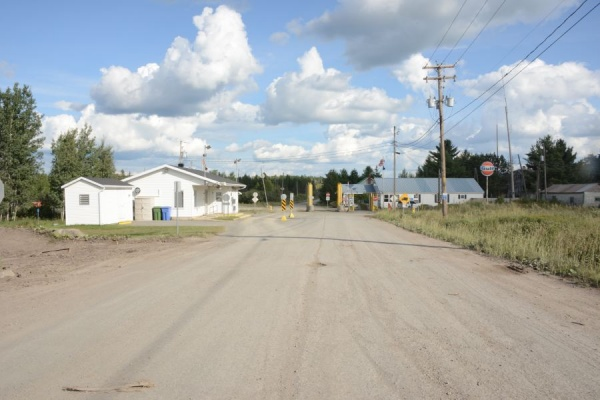
- US-Canada Border at St. Pamphile

Locaiton
- Country: United States; Canada
- Location: Blanchette Road / Rue Elgin Sud; US Port: Blanchette Road, St Pamphile, ME 04770; Canadian Port: 1123 Elgin Road South, Saint-Pamphile, Quebec G0R 3X0
- Coordinates: 46.942572°N 69.750384°W

Details
- Opened: 1949

Website
- http://www.cbp.gov/contact/ports/jackman

The Saint Pamphile Border Crossing, connecting Saint-Pamphile, Quebec to the US state of Maine across the Canada–United States border, is primarily used by Canadian logging trucks to access the privately owned North Maine Woods in Maine. Near the US port of entry is a company check station that issues permits to enter the woods. Logging operations have been conducted in this part of Maine for decades, and the processing plant in Canada is adjacent to the international boundary. The roads in the US are generally not passable into eastern Maine and in some cases are gated.

In 2017, a French citizen was arrested for crossing the border by bicycle while the crossing was closed and unattended for the evening.

== See also ==
- List of Canada–United States border crossings
