= Gobeil =

Gobeil may refer to:

== People ==
- Daniel Gobeil, Quebec politician
- Gilles Gobeil (born 1954), electroacoustic music composer residing in Montreal, Canada
- Paul Gobeil (born 1942), Canadian businessman and politician
- Samuel Gobeil, Quebec politician

== Places ==
- Gobeil River, a tributary of Big Black River, in Quebec, Canada, and Maine, United States
- Lac Gobeil Water Aerodrome, aerodrome located on Lac Gobeil, Quebec, Canada and is open from the middle of May until the middle of November.
