= Shields Branch =

River of South-East of Quebec

- Native name: Rivière Saint-Roch (French)

Physical characteristics
- Source
  - location: Mountain stream in Sainte-Perpétue, Chaudière-Appalaches, Quebec, MRC L'Islet Regional County Municipality, Chaudière-Appalaches, Quebec, in Canada
  - coordinates: 47°06′58″N 69°49′37″W
  - elevation: 444 metres (1,457 ft)
- Mouth
  - location: Big Black River (Saint John River), Township T15 R15 WELS, Maine, United States
  - coordinates: 46°55′26″N 69°37′48″W
  - elevation: 263 metres (863 ft)
- Length: 44.0 km (27.3 mi)

Basin features
- Tributaries
  - right: Frontier brook

The Shields Branch (French: Rivière Saint-Roch in Quebec) is a tributary of the Big Black River, flowing in:

- Quebec (Canada): in the administrative region of Chaudière-Appalaches, in L'Islet Regional County Municipality, in the municipalities of Sainte-Perpétue, Chaudière-Appalaches, Quebec, Saint-Omer, Quebec and Saint-Pamphile, Quebec;
- Maine (United States): in the Aroostook County, Township T15 R15 Wels.

Its course is situated between the Rochu River (or “Little Saint Rock River”) (West side) and the Gagnon River (West side). This river flows in forested area in a valley encircled by Notre Dame Mountains.

From its source (47°06′58″N 69°49′37″W), in L'Islet Regional County Municipality, the river runs south and southeast across the Canada–United States border in Maine Township 15, Range 15, WELS, to the Big Black River in T 14, R 15.

== Geography ==
The upper part of the "Saint Roch River" begins in Notre Dame Mountains, in the municipality of Sainte-Perpétue, Chaudière-Appalaches, Quebec in the L'Islet Regional County Municipality (RCM). This source is located at:

- 15.0 kilometres (9.3 mi) Northwest of the border between Quebec and Maine;
- 9.8 kilometres (6.1 mi) Northeast from the village of Sainte-Perpétue, Chaudière-Appalaches, Quebec;
- 35.3 kilometres (21.9 mi) Northwest from the confluence of the Saint-Roch River;
- 35.0 kilometres (21.7 mi) Southeast of the village center of Saint-Jean-Port-Joli, Quebec.

St. Roch river flows on 44.0 kilometres (27.3 mi) according to the following segments:

Upper river course (segment of 27.6 kilometres (17.1 mi) in Quebec)

From the source in the mountains, the Saint-Roch river flows:

- 8.1 kilometres (5.0 mi) to the South in Sainte-Perpétue, Chaudière-Appalaches, Quebec, cutting the path of range Taché East, up to the boundary of the municipality of Saint-Omer;
- 1.6 kilometres (0.99 mi) to the South in Saint-Omer, up to the boundary of the municipality of Sainte-Perpétue, Chaudière-Appalaches, Quebec;
- 150 metres (490 ft) to the South in Sainte-Perpétue, Chaudière-Appalaches, Quebec, up to the confluence of the Saint-Roch Nord River (from the West);
- 0.8 kilometres (0.50 mi) to the Southeast, up to the boundary of the municipality of Saint-Pamphile, Quebec;
- 2.8 kilometres (1.7 mi) (or 1.5 kilometres (0.93 mi) in direct line), winding towards the Southeast, up to the bridge of the "Little North range";
- 2.1 kilometres (1.3 mi) (or 1.5 kilometres (0.93 mi) in direct line), winding towards the Southeast, up to the bridge of the range of Pelletier;
- 7.3 kilometres (4.5 mi) (or 3.1 kilometres (1.9 mi) in direct line), winding towards the Southeast and straddling the boundary between Saint-Omer, Quebec and Saint-Pamphile, Quebec, up to the bridge of the range of Gagnon;
- 2.3 kilometres (1.4 mi) (or 1.4 kilometres (0.87 mi) in direct line), winding towards the Southeast, up to the bridge of 6th range;
- 1.6 kilometres (0.99 mi) to the Southeast, up to the confluence of the Gagnon River (Saint Roch River) (from the Southwest);
- 0.8 kilometres (0.50 mi) to the Southeast, up to the border between Quebec and Maine.

Lower course of the river (segment 16.4 kilometres (10.2 mi) in Maine designated "Shields Branch")

From the border between Quebec and Maine, the "Shields Branch" runs on:

- 2.0 kilometres (1.2 mi) to the Southeast in the Maine, up to the "Little Saint-Roch River" (from the Northeast). Note: This river takes its source in Quebec where it is designated Rochu River;
- 9.3 kilometres (5.8 mi) (or 4.7 kilometres (2.9 mi) in direct line) to the Southeast, winding end segment up to the highway bridge;
- 5.1 kilometres (3.2 mi) (or 2.3 kilometres (1.4 mi) in direct line) up to the Southeast, winding up to the confluence of the river.

The "Shields Branch" flows into a river curve on the North bank of the Big Black River, Township T14 R15 Wels, in the Aroostook County. This confluence is located:

- 8.5 kilometres (5.3 mi) Southeast of the border between Canada and U.S.
- 13.7 kilometres (8.5 mi) West of the confluence of the Big Black River
- 11.6 kilometres (7.2 mi) Southeast of the village center of Saint-Pamphile, in Quebec

== Toponymy ==
The place name "Saint-Roch River" was formalized on December 5, 1968, at the Commission de toponymie du Québec (Quebec Places Names Board).

== Bibliography ==
- "Shields Branch". Geographic Names Information System. United States Geological Survey, United States Department of the Interior. September 30, 1980.

== See also ==
- Little Saint Roch River, a stream
- List of rivers of Quebec
- List of rivers of Maine
