= Maine Warden Service =

Police agency

Agency overview
- Formed: 1880
- Headquarters: Augusta, Maine, United States
- Motto: Maine. Protected.
- Annual budget: $15,100,000 (2015)
- Parent department: Department of Inland Fisheries and Wildlife
- Website: maine.gov/ifw/warden-service

The Maine Warden Service is a police agency in the United States State of Maine responsible for the enforcement of fisheries and wildlife laws, and the coordination of search and rescue in wilderness areas of the state. Maine's game wardens strive to protect the state's fishing and hunting resources, Enforcing strict limits on the activities listed above to keep animal populations stable. Maine's Warden Service is operationally part of Maine's Department of Inland Fisheries and Wildlife, it is the oldest conservation law enforcement agency in the United States.

== History ==
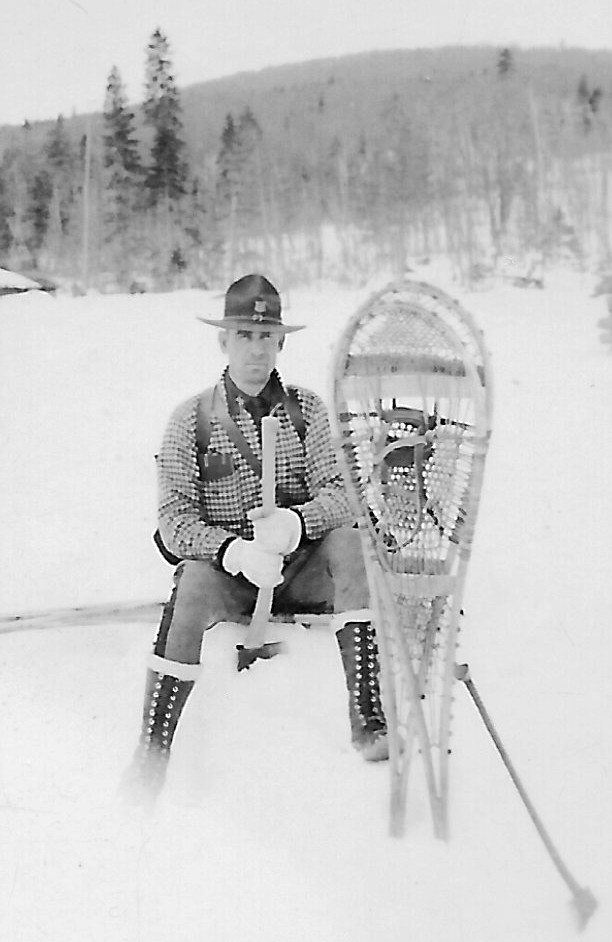
Allagash District warden Dave Jackson on snowshoe patrol in 1941

Maine began enforcement of hunting seasons in 1830 with game wardens appointed by the Governor of Maine responsible for enforcing seasonal restrictions. The Maine Warden Service was established fifty years later, in 1880, with an initial mandate to enforce newly enacted regulations related to the state's moose population. The United States' oldest conservation law enforcement agency, over time its authority was expanded to include wildlife generally, including inland fisheries.

In 1886 the Maine Warden Service saw its first line of duty death, when Wardens Lyman Hill and Charles Niles were shot and killed at the end of a ten-day pursuit, on horseback, of a poacher. The deaths are believed to be the first line of duty deaths of game wardens in American history. Since then, the Maine Warden Service has seen an additional 13 line of duty deaths.

=== 20th century ===
As an example of 20th century service, warden Dave Jackson (1902-1981) was assigned to patrol what is now the Allagash Wilderness Waterway in 1929 from a small cabin on Umsaskis Lake. He would make patrols lasting as long a ten days by canoe or walking during summer months, or on snowshoes during winter. Jackson narrowly avoided being hanged by an illegal snare set for deer. When he arrested poachers, they sometimes had to snowshoe more than 60 miles (97 km) to court. Jackson was often called upon to assist lost hunters or upset canoes. During World War II his knowledge of the remote terrain allowed him to lead a search for the crew of a crashed Canadian bomber. Four airmen were rescued as December temperatures dipped toward −40 °C (−40 °F), but the body of the fifth was not discovered until the following spring.

=== 21st century ===
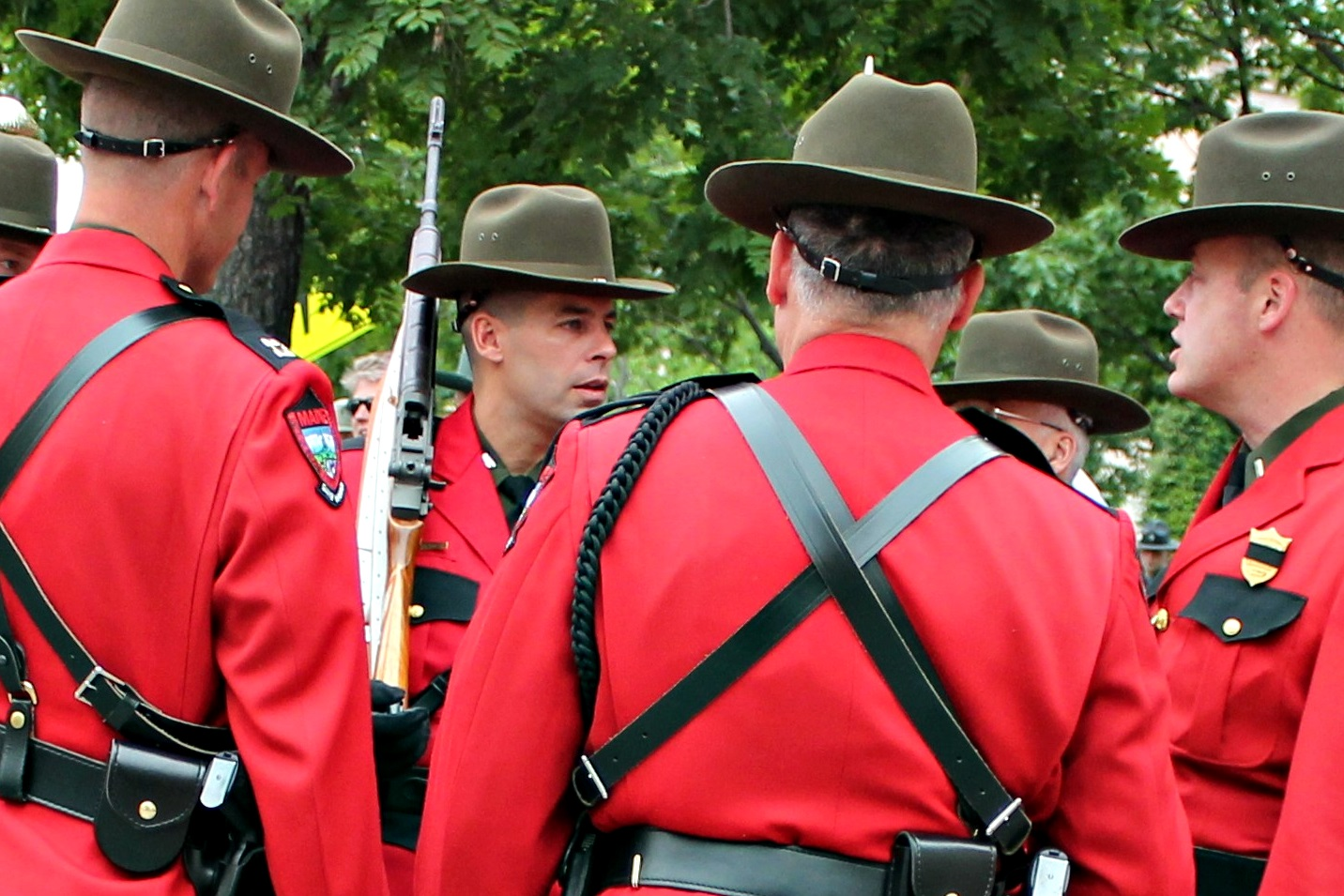
Maine Wardens pictured in 2012.

From 2012 to 2016, the Maine Warden Service was the subject of a television documentary series, North Woods Law, aired by Animal Planet. The service ended its participation in the program after a Portland Press Herald story which implied an undercover operation had been influenced by the production company. Officials denied the accusation, with the Maine Warden Service saying they had initially agreed to the documentary series to help recruiting efforts and that goal had been realized, while then-Governor of Maine Paul LePage said he had called for an end to the production because he felt the content of shows reflected poorly on Maine.

== Organization and training ==
The Warden Service is headed by the Director of the Bureau of the Warden Service, who holds the rank of colonel.

As of 2017, Maine Wardens were required to complete a 30-week training program prior to commissioning.

In addition to its regional units, the Warden Service has several specialized teams providing statewide support, including an aviation unit, an investigations team staffed by four detectives, and an incident management team responsible for coordinating large-scale and complex search and rescue operations.

== Resources ==
The Maine Warden Service deploys three fixed-wing aircraft.

== See also ==
- Maine Marine Patrol
- Maine State Police
