= Depot River =

Physical characteristics
- Source
  - location: Little Presley Lake, Township T12 R17 WELS, Aroostook County, North Maine Woods, Maine, United States
  - coordinates: 46°42′26″N 69°54′20″W
  - elevation: 367 metres (1,204 ft)
- Mouth
  - location: Big Black River (Saint John River), Township T14 R15 WELS, Aroostook County, North Maine Woods, Maine, United States
  - coordinates: 46°52′08″N 69°41′55″W
  - elevation: 264 metres (866 ft)
- Length: 46.2 km (28.7 mi)

Basin features
- Tributaries
  - left: (Upstream) Discharge of Blood Lake, Dead brook (or "ruisseau Dumas", in Quebec), Brown brook (or « rivière Brown » in Quebec), Glazier brook.
  - right: Cunliffe brook.

The Depot River (French: rivière Depot) is a tributary of the Big Black River (Saint John River), flowing in the townships T12 R17 Wels, T13 R16 Wels and T14 R15 Wels, in the Aroostook County in North Maine Woods in Maine, in United States.

Its course runs entirely through forested region in an isolated mountain valley.

The watershed of the Depot River is accessible by some forest roads of Maine.

== Geography ==
The source of the Depot River begins at the mouth of Little Lake Presley (French: Petit lac Presley) (length: 0.8 kilometres (0.50 mi); altitude: 367 metres (1,204 ft)), in townships T12 R17 WELS, in North Maine Woods, in Maine. This lake is located in a small valley between two mountains (the one on west reached 448 metres (1,470 ft) above sea level and that on the east reached 408 metres (1,339 ft)).

This source is located at:

- 4.6 kilometres (2.9 mi) southeast of the border between Quebec and Maine;
- 16.7 kilometres (10.4 mi) southwest of Mount Depot (Depot Mountain);
- 29.6 kilometres (18.4 mi) Ssuthwest of the confluence of the Depot River;
- 6.3 kilometres (3.9 mi) east of the Frontier Lake (Quebec-Maine) in Quebec.

From the mouth of Little Lake Presley, the Depot River flows over 46.2 kilometres (28.7 mi) as follows:

Upper courses of Depot River (segment of 16.1 kilometres (10.0 mi))

- 0.8 kilometres (0.50 mi) to the northeast in the Maine, up to the southwest bank of Mud Pond;
- 0.8 kilometres (0.50 mi) to the northeast, crossing the Mud Pond (altitude: 364 metres (1,194 ft)) over its full length to the mouth;
- 2.4 kilometres (1.5 mi) to the northeast by cutting a forest road and across a marsh area in the second half of the segment, up to the confluence of a stream (from the southwest);
- 3.4 kilometres (2.1 mi) to the north through a narrow marsh area up to a stream (from the northwest which drains a large marsh area, with dozens of small lakes);
- 2.8 kilometres (1.7 mi) eastward up to the discharge (from the south) of a series of lakes;
- 2.7 kilometres (1.7 mi) to the northeast up to the west shore of Lake Depot (length: 4.0 kilometres (2.5 mi); height: 326 metres (1,070 ft));
- 3.2 kilometres (2.0 mi) northwards crossing the Lake Depot to the mouth.

Note: Lake Depot gets its water from the top of the Depot River and a stream (from the south) which is the discharge of a series of lakes and Mary L Pond.

Lower courses of Depot River (segment of 30.1 kilometres (18.7 mi))

- 2.3 kilometres (1.4 mi) to the northwest up to Glazier Brook;
- 2.7 kilometres (1.7 mi) (or 1.3 kilometres (0.81 mi) direct line) to the northeast, winding up Brown Brook (from the northwest or the Quebec where it is designated Brown River);
- 6.2 kilometres (3.9 mi) (or 3.5 kilometres (2.2 mi) direct line) to the north, winding end segment until Dead Brook (from the northwest);
- 2.7 kilometres (1.7 mi) to the northeast, up to a stream (from the northwest or the Quebec);
- 6.5 kilometres (4.0 mi) to the east, skirting the northern Mont Depot (altitude: 446 metres (1,463 ft)) up to Cunliffe Stream (from the south);
- 2.8 kilometres (1.7 mi) to the southeast, up to a stream (from the south);
- 0.8 kilometres (0.50 mi) to the northeast, up to a bridge of a forest road;
- 2.3 kilometres (1.4 mi) north, up to a stream (from the west);
- 3.8 kilometres (2.4 mi) to the southeast, winding end segment, up to the confluence of the river.

This confluence is located:

- 7.3 kilometres (4.5 mi) at the southeast of the Canada-US border;
- 19.4 kilometres (12.1 mi) at the southwest of the confluence of the Big Black River (Saint John River).

The Depot River pours on the south bank of the Big Black River (Saint John River) (French: Grande rivière Noire) in the township T14 R15 Wels, in the Aroostook County. The latter flows northeast zigzagging up to a river bend of Saint John River where it pours on the west bank. The latest flows to the east, then southeast through all the New Brunswick and pours on the north bank of the Bay of Fundy which opens to the southwest on the Atlantic Ocean.

== Toponymy ==
The term "Depot" is associated with the Depot River in Lake Depot and Mont Depot.

== See also ==
- Aroostook County, a county Maine
- Brown River, a stream
- Big Black River (Saint John River), a stream
- Saint John River (Bay of Fundy), a stream
- North Maine Woods, a geographical region of Maine
- List of rivers of Maine

== Bibliography ==
- "Depot Stream". Geographic Names Information System. United States Geological Survey, United States Department of the Interior. September 30, 1980.
