= David Pingree (merchant) =

American businessman and politician (1795–1863)

- Born: December 31, 1795; Georgetown, Massachusetts
- Died: March 31, 1863 (aged 67)
- Occupation: Merchant
- Relatives: Thomas Perkins (uncle)

David Pingree (December 31, 1795 – March 31, 1863) was a merchant from Georgetown, Massachusetts, whose wealth later formed the Seven Islands Land Company in 1964. In 2018, his heirs are the 10th largest landowners in the United States. He was Mayor of Salem, Massachusetts, from March 1851 to March 1852.

== Life ==
Pingree was born in Georgetown, Massachusetts and later moved to Bridgton, Maine. After graduating from school he joined his uncle, Thomas Perkins in Salem, Massachusetts. Perkins owned a successful shipping firm, Peabody & Perkins. Pingree also worked closely with, Edward D. Kimball, another merchant and ship owner. After Perkin's death in 1830 Pingree inherited his uncle's wealth and continued to ship merchandise across the world through his many vessels and ships. His trade focused on East and West India as well as Africa. He became among the first to import gum copal from West Africa which is used to manufacture varnish for marine use.

Pingree's family holdings date back to 1820. Throughout his life, Pingree was interested in purchasing Eastern lands in New Hampshire and Mount Washington. He built a carriage road to the summit of Mount Washington. His business in Salem was so large he was nicknamed the "Merchant Prince of Salem".

In 1831, Pingree became president of Naumkeag Bank. He became president of Naumkeag Cotton Company in 1845 and held the position until his death.

In March 1851, he became Mayor of Salem, a position he would hold for one year.

=== Death ===
Pingree died on March 31, 1863, at the age of 67.

== Legacy ==
=== Pingree family ===
Pingree's family inherited his wealth and is currently the tenth largest landowners in the United States, owning 830,000 acres across Maine under the Seven Islands Land Company.
