= Chamberlain Lake =

Lake in Maine, United States

- Location within Maine Location within the United States
- Location: Piscataquis County, Maine
- Coordinates: 46°13′N 69°18′W
- Primary outflows: Webster Brook
- Basin countries: United States
- Max. length: 14 mi (23 km)
- Max. width: 2 mi (3.2 km)
- Surface area: 10,932 acres (4,424 ha)
- Max. depth: 154 feet (47 m)
- Water volume: 473,380 acre⋅ft (583,910,000 m^{3})
- Surface elevation: 942 ft (287 m)

Chamberlain Lake is one of the largest and deepest lakes in the North Maine Woods. The lake originally drained north through Eagle Lake and Churchill Lake into the Allagash River tributary to the Saint John River. Nineteenth-century logging operations diverted the lake into the Penobscot River before designation of the Allagash Wilderness Waterway in 1966.

== History ==
Telos Lake drained into the south end of Chamberlain Lake until the Telos Cut was excavated in 1841 to allow Telos Lake to drain east into Webster Lake and the Penobscot River. In the 1850s Eben S. Coe built the timber crib Lock Dam across the outlet from Chamberlain Lake causing Chamberlain Lake to overflow southward through Round Pond, Telos Lake, Webster Lake and Webster Brook into the East Branch Penobscot River in Baxter State Park. These changes allowed logs harvested in the upper Saint John River watershed to be floated to Bangor sawmills. The combined level of Chamberlain Lake, Round Pond, and Telos Lake has subsequently been regulated by Telos Dam.

== Togue habitat ==
Summer water temperatures range from 64° near the surface to 52° in the deepest pools. Cold water with high dissolved oxygen concentrations provides good habitat for togue if water levels are stable after autumn spawning occurs in the rocky shallows. Lake whitefish and round whitefish are the main food source for Chamberlain Lake togue. The lake also supports brook trout.
