= Eagle Lake (Maine) =

Lake in Maine, United States

- Location within Maine Location within the United States
- Location: Piscataquis County, Maine
- Coordinates: 46°20′N 69°21′W
- Primary outflows: [fish river waterway]
- Basin countries: United States
- Max. length: 18 mi (29 km)
- Surface area: 9,554 acres (3,866 ha)
- Max. depth: 124 feet (38 m)
- Water volume: 220,866 acre⋅ft (272,434,000 m^{3})
- Surface elevation: 928 ft (283 m)

Eagle Lake is the first, largest, and deepest lake of the Allagash Wilderness Waterway in the North Maine Woods. The lake covers the eastern side of Eagle Lake township. The southern end of the lake extends into Maine township 7, range 12, where it receives overflow from Indian Pond, and into Soper Mountain township where it receives overflow from Haymock Lake via Smith Brook. Other ponds in the Eagle Lake watershed include Woodman Pond via Woodman Brook, Pillsbury Pond and Little Pillsbury Pond via Smith Brook, Soper Pond and Upper Soper Pond via Soper Brook, and the Russell Ponds via Russell Brook. Eagle Lake originally received overflow from Chamberlain Lake, but Lock Dam has diverted most Chamberlain Lake overflow through Telos Cut to the Penobscot River since the 1850s.

== Churchill Lake Dam ==
A dam in Maine township 10, range 12, has raised the level of Churchill Lake, extending its waters from the adjoining range 12 township 9 into the north end of Eagle Lake in adjoining range 13 of township 9. The dam controls the elevation of Eagle Lake by regulating releases to the Allagash River, a tributary of the Saint John River. Personnel at Churchill Depot control dam releases to sustain Allagash River summer flows, ensuring favorable conditions for canoe passage through the Allagash Wilderness Waterway.

== Fish habitat ==
The Maine Department of Inland Fisheries and Wildlife considers Eagle Lake ideal habitat for togue, squaretail, cusk, and lake whitefish, and has endeavored to protect the lake from the introduction of competing species like yellow perch. Releases from the Churchill Lake Dam may be reduced during autumn and winter months to sustain water levels and cover rocky shoals used for spawning.
