= Seven Islands Land Company =

Land and timber management holding company

Seven Islands Land Company is a privately held land and timber management holding company based in Bangor, Maine.

== Pingree family ==
Seven Islands manages approximately 1 million acres (4,000 km^{2}) of forest in the North Maine Woods, in northern and western Maine, for dozens of members of the Pingree family, descendants of wealthy Salem, Massachusetts, shipping magnate David Pingree (nicknamed the "Merchant Prince of Salem"). He began to acquire the Maine lands more than 150 years ago.

In 1997, the family's Seven Islands Land Company is believed to be the fourth largest private landowner in the United States, according to an analysis by Worth magazine. Seven Islands is integrally tied to another family entity, Pingree Associates. As of 2017, the Pingree family is 10th largest private landowner in the United States.

=== History ===
The Pingree family holdings date back to 1820, when Maine became a state. In that year, Pingree, correctly believing that his city would cease to be a major port, started purchasing vast tracts of softwoods and hardwoods as an investment hedge.

Over the next 150 years, the Pingree holdings would reach 1 million acres (4,000 km^{2}) and include over 2,000 miles (3200 km) of shore frontage along major rivers and streams, more than 100 lakes, 24,800 acres (100 km^{2}) of deer yards and 72,000 acres (290 km^{2}) of wetland habitat.

== Development and conservation ==
Development on the Pingree's Seven Islands Land Company property, much of which surrounds Baxter State Park and the Allagash River, is heavily restricted.

In 2001, Pingree Associates announced they had negotiated an arrangement with the New England Forestry Foundation to sell undevelopable easements on three-quarters of their nearly 1 million acres (4,000 km^{2}). The remaining 250,000 acres (1,000 km^{2}) were made available for limited development.

The agreement created the largest conservation easement in American history, effectively putting an area larger than the state of Rhode Island off-limits to development.

== See also ==
- North Maine Woods topics
- Chellie Pingree
- Hannah Pingree
- Hazen S. Pingree
