= Saint-Pamphile =

Town in Quebec, Canada

- City
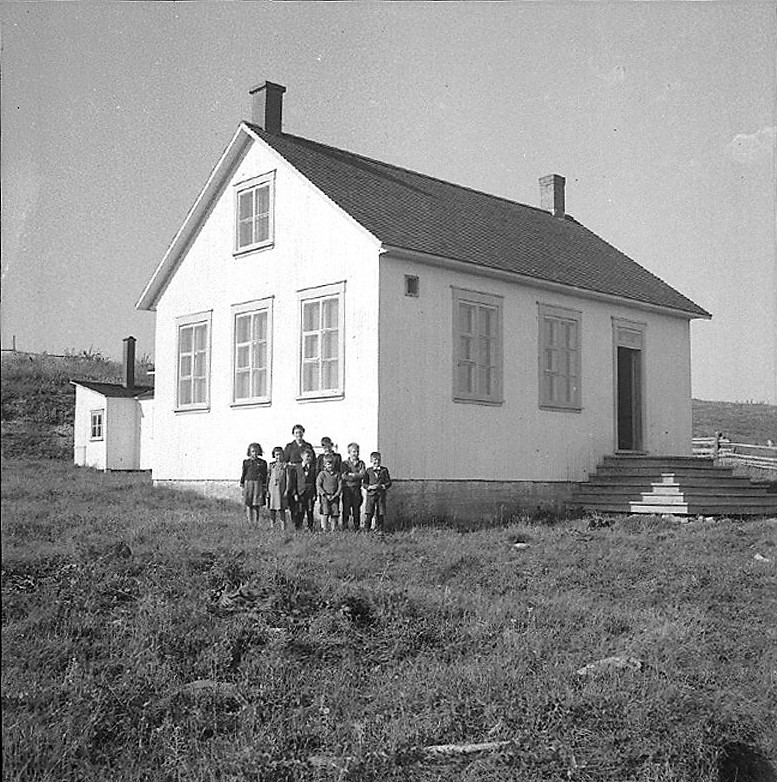
- A rural school in 1939

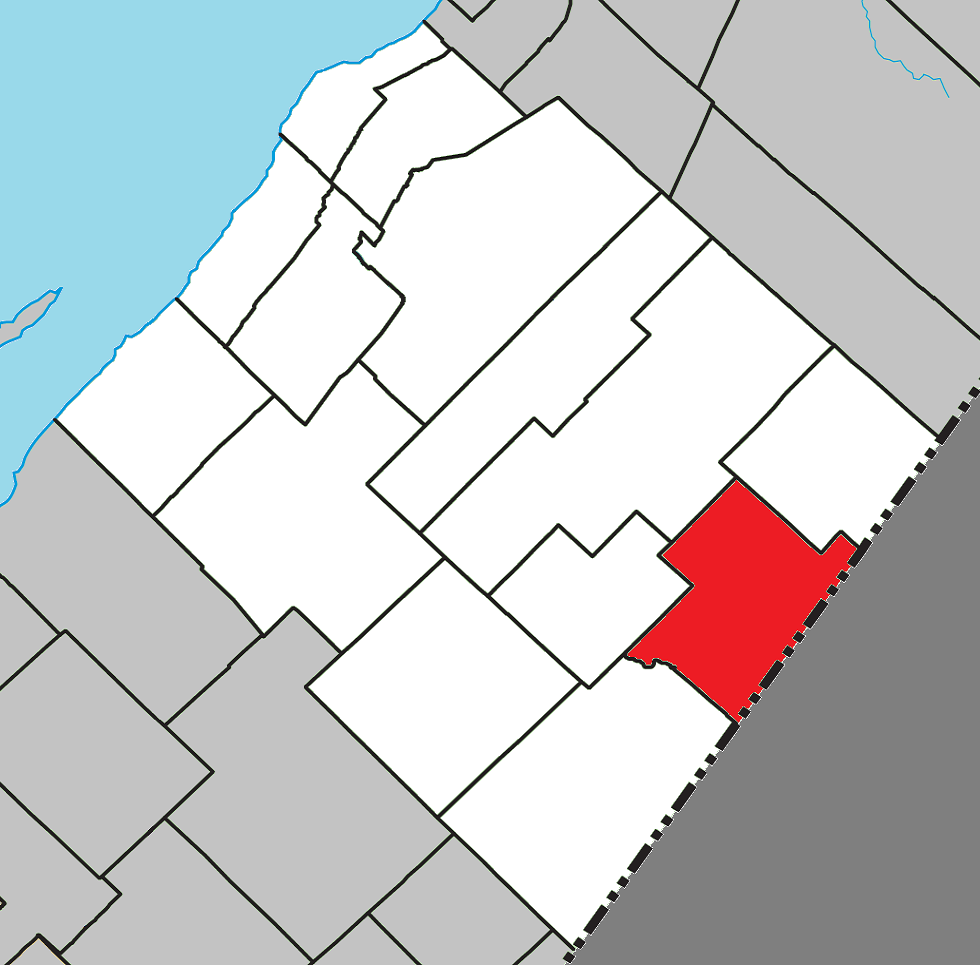
- Location within L'Islet RCM

- Location in southern Quebec
- Coordinates: 46°58′N 69°47′W
- Country: Canada
- Province: Quebec
- Region: Chaudière-Appalaches
- RCM: L'Islet
- Constituted: January 21, 1888

Government
  - Mayor: Mario Leblanc
  - Federal riding: Côte-du-Sud—Rivière-du-Loup—Kataskomiq—Témiscouata
  - Prov. riding: Côte-du-Sud

Area
  - Total: 137.90 km^{2} (53.24 sq mi)
  - Land: 137.78 km^{2} (53.20 sq mi)

Population (2021)
  - Total: 2,274
  - Density: 16.5/km^{2} (43/sq mi)
  - Pop 2016-2021: ▼5.3%
  - Dwellings: 1,188
- Demonym: Pamphilien(ne)
- Time zone: UTC−5 (EST)
  - Summer (DST): UTC−4 (EDT)
- Postal code(s): G0R 3X0
- Area codes: 418 and 581
- Highways: R-204
- Website: www.saintpamphile.ca

Saint-Pamphile (French pronunciation: [sɛ̃ pɑ̃fil]) is a town in the Canadian province of Quebec situated in the L'Islet Regional County Municipality in the Chaudière-Appalaches administrative district. While the official municipal territory ends at the Canada–United States border located at the eastern end of town, there is a tiny hamlet located immediately east of the border, known as St-Pamphile, Maine. The hamlet is historically part of the larger entity located in Quebec and is considered an integral part of the town by locals. The economy of St-Pamphile, Maine is entirely dependent upon the economy of St-Pamphile, Quebec, from which Maine residents obtain goods and services, and sometimes even employment. Saint-Pamphile, Quebec is the central town of seven neighboring parishes and provides a CLSC, elementary school, and high school for the area.

== History ==
The first settler in the town was Frédéric Vaillancourt from the nearby Saint-Aubert municipality in the year 1859. Given that the surrounding land appeared to be fertile amongst a mostly rocky landscape, many settlers followed his lead, and in 1870, Saint-Pamphile became a parish. In 1889, the area was officially declared a municipality. It wasn't until 1963 that Saint-Pamphile was granted the legal status of city.

The community was named in tribute to Pamphile-Gaspard Verreault, a notary who represented L'Islet in the Legislative Assembly of Quebec from 1867 to 1878.

== Demographics ==
In the 2021 Census of Population conducted by Statistics Canada, Saint-Pamphile had a population of 2,274 living in 1,097 of its 1,188 total private dwellings, a change of −5.3% from its 2016 population of 2,400. With a land area of 137.78 km^{2} (53.20 sq mi), it had a population density of 16.5/km^{2} (42.7/sq mi) in 2021.

=== Population ===
Canada census – Saint-Pamphile community profile

	2021	2016	2011
Population	2,274 (-5.3% from 2016)	2,400 (-10.6% from 2011)	2,685 (-0.7% from 2006)
Land area	137.78 km^{2} (53.20 sq mi)	137.77 km^{2} (53.19 sq mi)	137.21 km^{2} (52.98 sq mi)
Population density	16.5/km^{2} (43/sq mi)	17.4/km^{2} (45/sq mi)	19.6/km^{2} (51/sq mi)
Median age	55.2 (M: 54, F: 56)	53.1 (M: 52.5, F: 53.7)	48.9 (M: 47.9, F: 49.7)
Private dwellings	1,188 (total)	1,227 (total)	1,281 (total)
Median household income	$59,200	$52,315	$51,994

References: 2021 2016 2011

== Economy ==
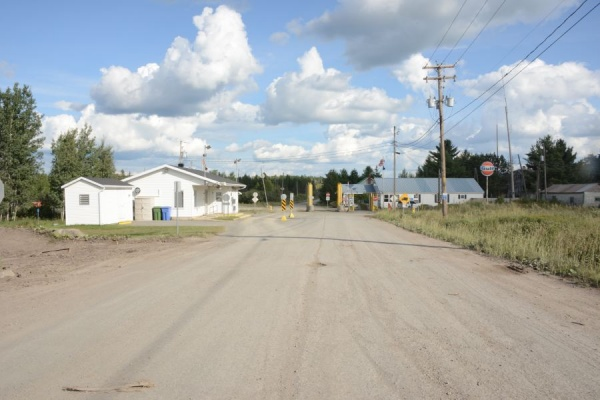
Customs station and North Maine Woods checkpoint in Saint-Pamphile

The Saint Pamphile Border Crossing connects Canada and the United States. It is at a logging yard; the main economic activity of the region is timber. There are two major companies present who deal with raw materials: Maibec and Matériaux Blanchet.

== Arts and culture ==
The lumberjack festival is held on the last full weekend of August. It showcases a variety of sporting activities that call to mind the dominance of forestry in the region. At the event, one may watch forestry competitions and shows (comedy, music, dance, among others) Other activities include barbecues, picnics, and golf tournaments. The gathering attracts more than 25,000 visitors annually.

In mid-February, another event takes place in St-Pamphile, known as the Appalachian Odyssey. It attracts a large number of mushers for dog sled races, the longest trail for which is some 200 kilometres (120 mi) long and crosses each of the seven parishes in the county. There are also many other competitions during the event. This annual event gains popularity every year.

== See also ==
- Gobeil River
- Big Black River (Saint John River)
- List of municipalities in Quebec
