= Sainte-Félicité, Chaudière-Appalaches =

Sainte-Félicité
- Municipality
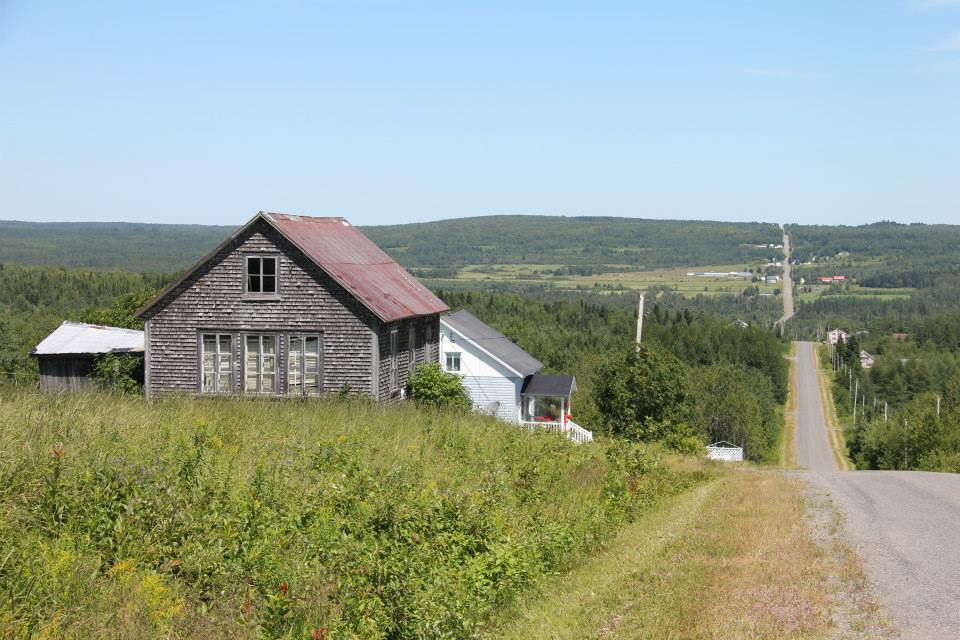

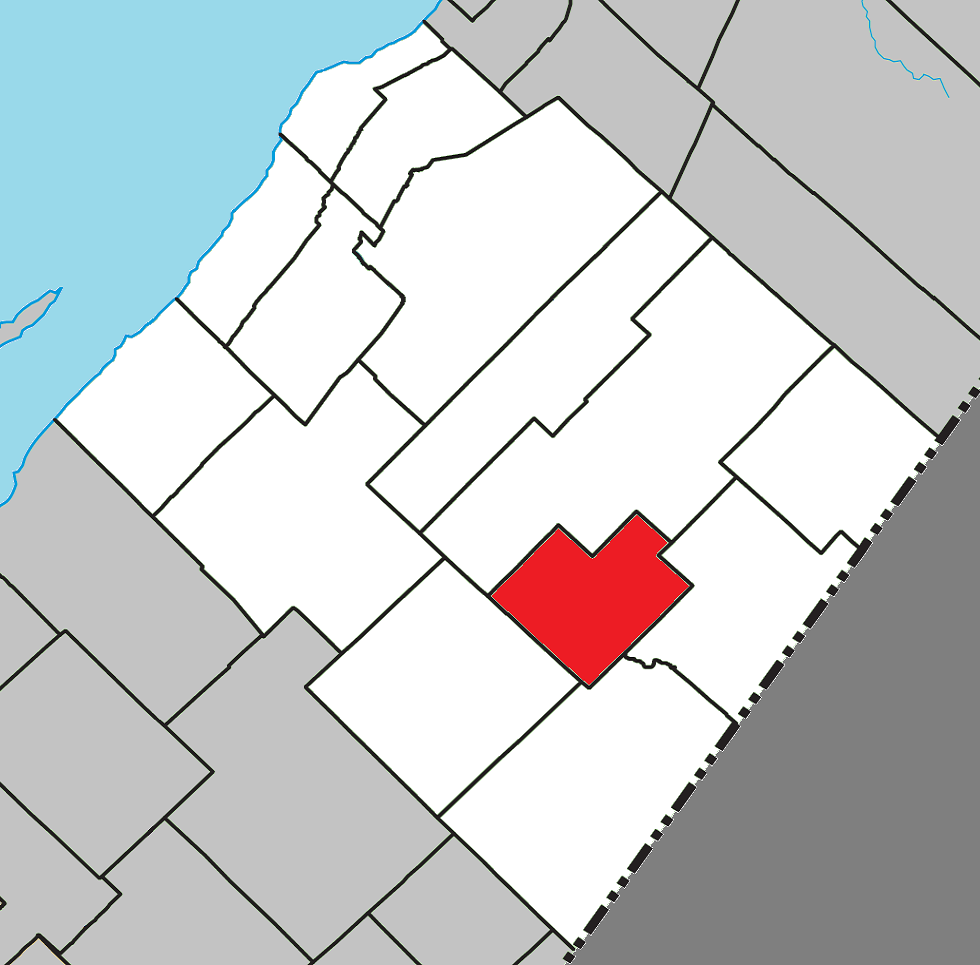
- Location within L'Islet RCM.

- Location in southern Quebec.
- Coordinates: 46°57′N 69°56′W
- Country: Canada
- Province: Quebec
- Region: Chaudière-Appalaches
- RCM: L'Islet
- Constituted: January 1, 1950

Government
  - Mayor: Gérard Gagnon
  - Federal riding: Côte-du-Sud—Rivière-du-Loup—Kataskomiq—Témiscouata
  - Prov. riding: Côte-du-Sud

Area
  - Total: 94.10 km^{2} (36.33 sq mi)
  - Land: 94.89 km^{2} (36.64 sq mi)
- There is an apparent contradiction between two authoritative sources

Population (2021)
  - Total: 350
  - Density: 3.7/km^{2} (9.6/sq mi)
  - Pop 2016-2021: ▼10%
  - Dwellings: 189
- Time zone: UTC−05:00 (EST)
  - Summer (DST): UTC−04:00 (EDT)
- Postal code(s): G0R 4P0
- Area codes: 418 and 581
- Highways: R-216

Sainte-Félicité (French pronunciation: [sɛ̃t felisite]) is a municipality in L'Islet Regional County Municipality in the Chaudière-Appalaches region of Quebec. Its population in the 2021 Canadian census was 350.

== See also ==
- L'Islet Regional County Municipality
- Gobeil River, a river
- Big Black River (Saint John River), a river
- List of municipalities in Quebec
