= Umsaskis Lake =

Lake in Aroostook County, Maine, United States

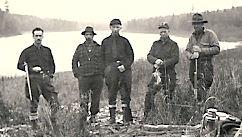
- Umsaskis Lake in 1941

- Location within Maine Location within the United States
- Location: North Maine Woods, Aroostook County, Maine
- Coordinates: 46°35.5′N 69°22.5′W
- Primary inflows: Allagash River
- Primary outflows: Allagash River
- Basin countries: United States
- Surface elevation: 818 feet (249 m)

Umsaskis Lake is a lake on the Allagash River in the North Maine Woods region of Maine.

It is located in Aroostook County and lies approximately 27 miles (43 km) from the Canada-U.S. border.

The lake is on the Northern Forest Canoe Trail.
