= Maine Marine Patrol =

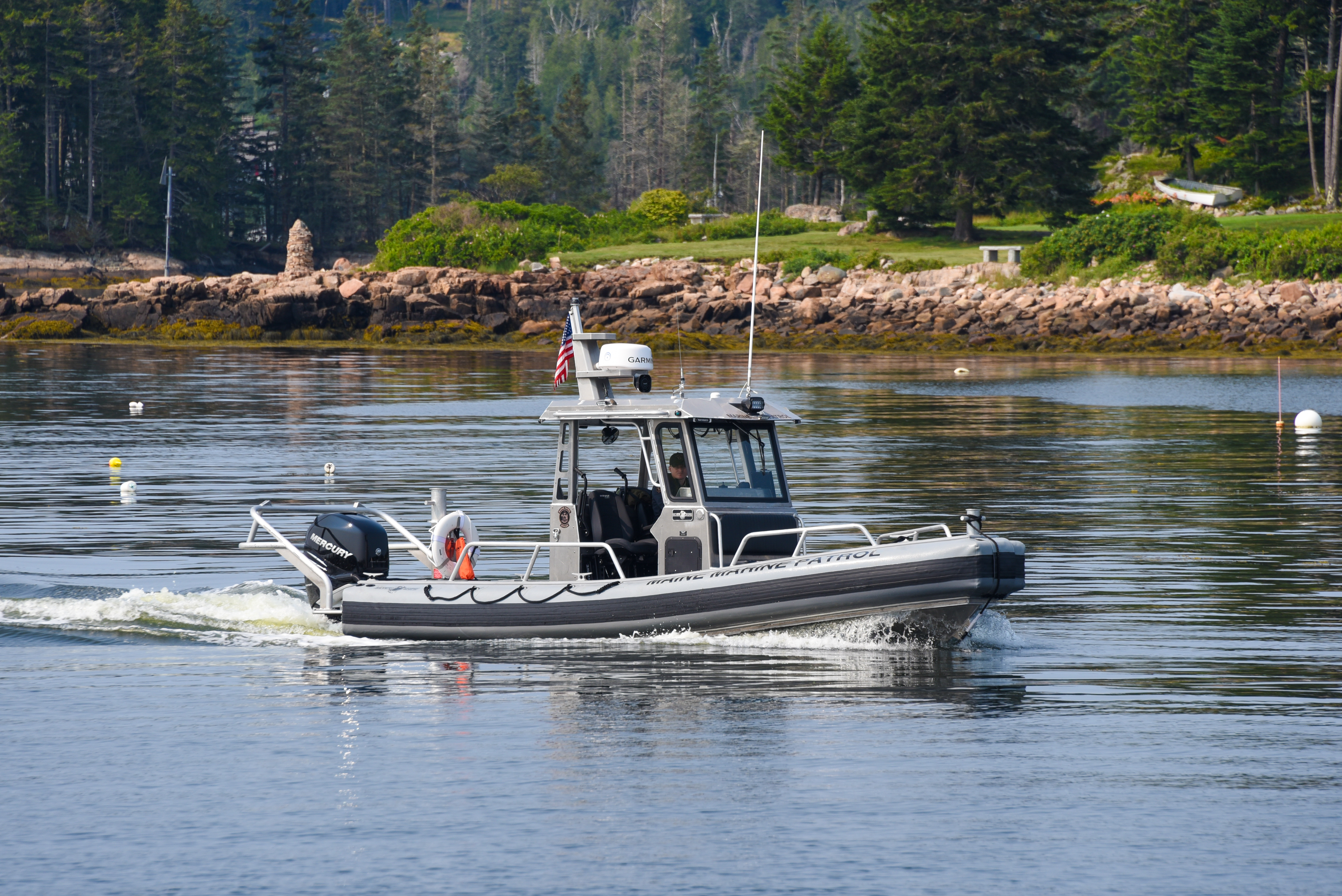
- Maine Marine Patrol boat coming into Winter Harbor.

Agency overview
- Headquarters: Augusta, Maine, United States
- Employees: 50 (2015)
- Agency executives: Colonel Matthew Talbot, Chief; Major Robert Beal, Deputy Chief
- Parent department: Department of Marine Resources
- Website: www.maine.gov/dmr/marine-patrol

The Maine Marine Patrol is a maritime police service in the United States State of Maine. It claims to be the oldest law enforcement agency in Maine.

== History ==
In 1867 Maine first employed "commissioners of fisheries", law enforcement officers charged with enforcement of fishing regulations in the state. By 1870 the title of this office had been changed to "fisheries warden"; over the next 60 years the number of fisheries wardens employed by Maine increased to more than 30. Following World War II the title of the office was again changed, to "coastal warden". Coastal wardens were organized into the Coastal Warden Service. In 1978 the force was reconstituted under its current name of Maine Marine Patrol.

The Maine Marine Patrol is responsible for enforcement of state and federal fishing regulations in coastal and tidal areas of Maine, providing maritime security inside Maine territorial waters, and coordinating maritime search and rescue operations. It also supports the Maine State Police in "tactical boardings of vessels at sea or in port".

Through an agreement with the United States Customs and Border Protection, the Maine Marine Patrol assists in border protection in the "grey zone", an area including Machias Seal Island which is the object of a two-century old territorial dispute between the United States and Canada. Since 2015 it has quadrupled the number of officers assigned to the grey zone due to a perceived increase in the potential for violence in the area.

== Organization and training ==
As of 2019, the Maine Marine Patrol is Commanded by the Colonel. His command staff is made up of, 1 Major who supervises the operations of the law enforcement bureau, and 1 Captain who supervises special services for the Bureau. Operationally, the Maine Marine Patrol is divided into six geographic sections that comprise two separate divisions. Division 1 covers the coast and inland areas from Kittery to Belfast Maine. Division 2 covers the coast and inland areas from Belfast to Calais/Lubec Maine areas. The divisions are commanded by a Lieutenant with three Sergeants that supervise a section staffed by one specialist (large boat operator) and seven marine patrol officers. Maine Marine Patrol Officers go through a stringent selection and hiring process. Once hired, a new officer must attend the Maine Criminal Justice Academy for 18 weeks of the Basic Law Enforcement Training Program. Upon graduation from the Academy, the officers first year on the job is spent completing his or her field and advanced training.

Rank Structure of the Maine Marine Patrol

Title:

Colonel

Major

Captain

Lieutenant

Sergeant

Specialist

Officer

== Resources ==
The Maine Marine Patrol deploys a number of different types of equipment for patrol functions. These are 1 fixed wing aircraft for patrol and search and rescue functions. The aircraft is piloted by a licensed pilot who is a Marine Patrol Sergeant.

Six large patrol Vessels made up of 2 46' high powered diesel patrol boats, 2 42' high powered diesel patrol boats, and 1 38' high powered diesel patrol boat as well as 1 35' high powered diesel patrol boat. These large patrol vessels, are operated by Specialists. This is a marine patrol officer that has been promoted to this position and has completed boat operators training at the Federal Law Enforcement Training Center. Upon successful completion of this training the specialist has become a US Coast Guard licensed Boat Captain.

Each Marine Patrol Officer is issued a marked extended cab 4 wheel drive pickup for patrol as well as a 21' high speed patrol boat for use with in their individual assigned patrol areas.

== See also ==
- Maine Warden Service
