= Maibec =

Manufacturer in Quebec, Canada

Maibec is a privately held Quebec company owned and operated by the Tardif family from Quebec City. Originally a lumber manufacturer, Maibec produces wood products for the construction and landscaping markets. It employs approximately 700 people in three regions of Quebec: Saint-Pamphile de l’Islet, Saint-Théophile de Beauce, and Saint-Romuald. Maibec was founded in 1946; in 1969 it adopted the name Maibec, a portmanteau of Maine and Quebec. In September 2014, Maibec finalized an agreement to acquire the Fraser Timber lumber mill in Masardis, Maine, United States. Maibec also invested $20 million in 2014 to modernize its mill in Saint-Pamphile.

== Organization ==
Maibec is directed by François Tardif.

== Products ==
Maibec manufactures two main types of products:

=== Construction lumber ===
Over the course of its history, the company has invested in manufacturing customized specialty products with the following features:

- Made-to-measure dimensions
- North American structural standards
- Custom humidity levels
- Custom standards of appearance

Byproducts are used in pulp and paper, the production of panels and in energy production.

=== Solid wood siding ===
This business segment includes the following product families:

- Natural or factory-stained cedar shingles in traditional and decorative cuts, sold individually or in pre-assembled strips
- Factory-stained siding in various profiles
- Stained moldings in various profiles
- Accessories to enhance the appearance of siding
- By-products are used in the manufacture of cedar mulch, cedar shims, and wood chips for the pulp and paper industry.

== Environment ==
Maibec also maintains an FSC mixed chain of custody for its products, from the forest floor to the market (FSC, SFI). The purpose of these certifications is to ensure that timber production follows procedures designed to ensure the sustainable management of forests and to encourage initiatives that promote the social, environmental and economically responsible management of forests by making them both visible and credible by affixing a label to products derived from certified forests. To increase the knowledge of forestry stakeholders in northeastern United States and Canada on how to better regenerate and improve the growth of the Eastern White Cedar species, Maibec financed a group of academic and government researchers from Quebec, Ontario and Maine to increase silvicultural knowledge of this species. Following this 12-year collaboration, the US Forest Service and Canadian Forest Service published in early 2013, in English and French respectively, a silvicultural guide.

== Awards and distinctions ==
- In 2011, Gilbert Tardif was presented with the Cecobois Emeritus Award.
- In 2014, Maibec ranked 199th among the 500 largest companies in Quebec by the Quebec French-language magazine Les Affaires.

== Competitors ==
- SBC Cedar (Le Spécialiste du Bardeau de Cèdre)
- Waska
- Fraser Wood Siding
