= Saint-Adalbert, Quebec =

Saint-Adalbert
- Municipality
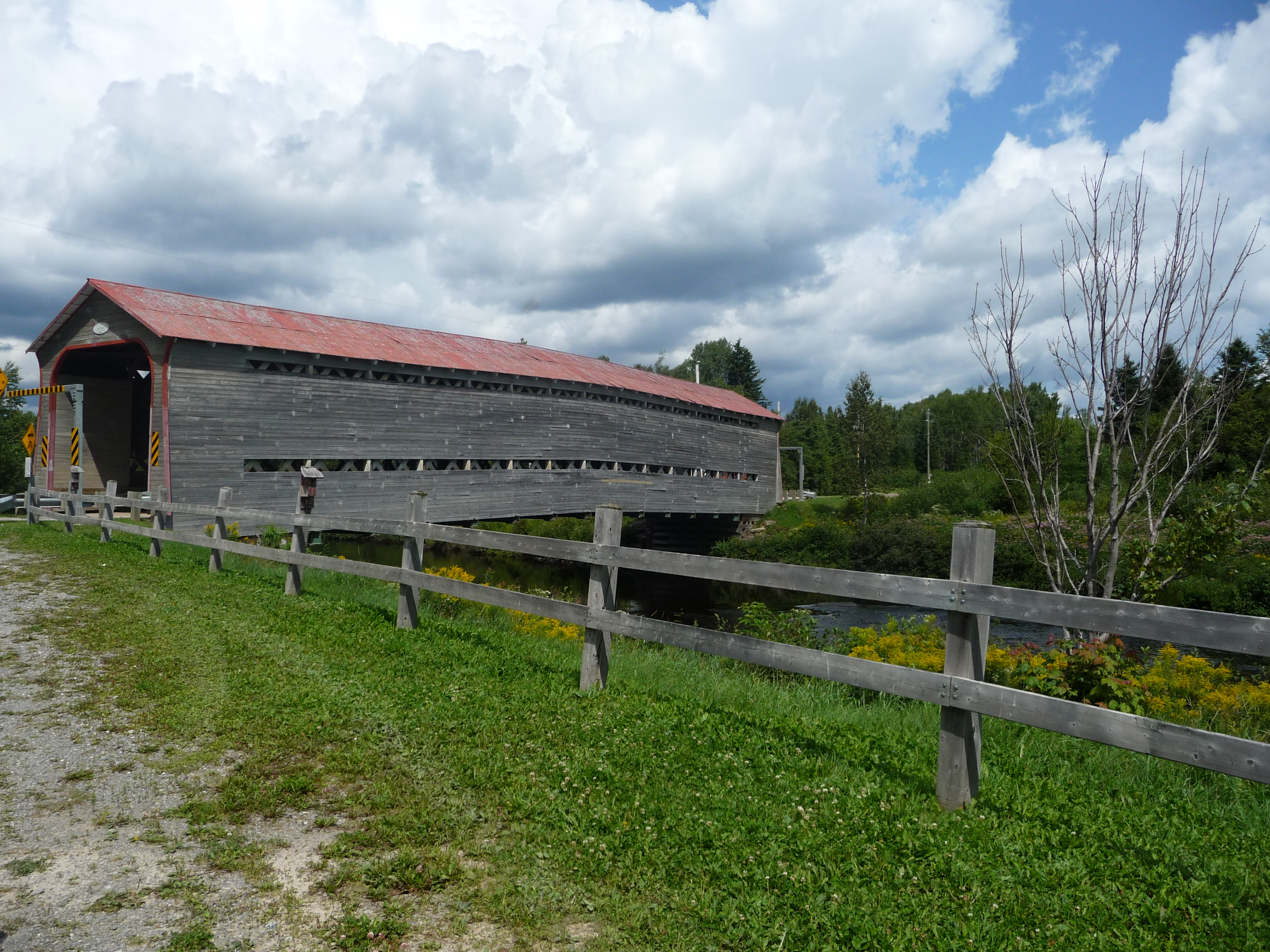
- Pont Du Sault

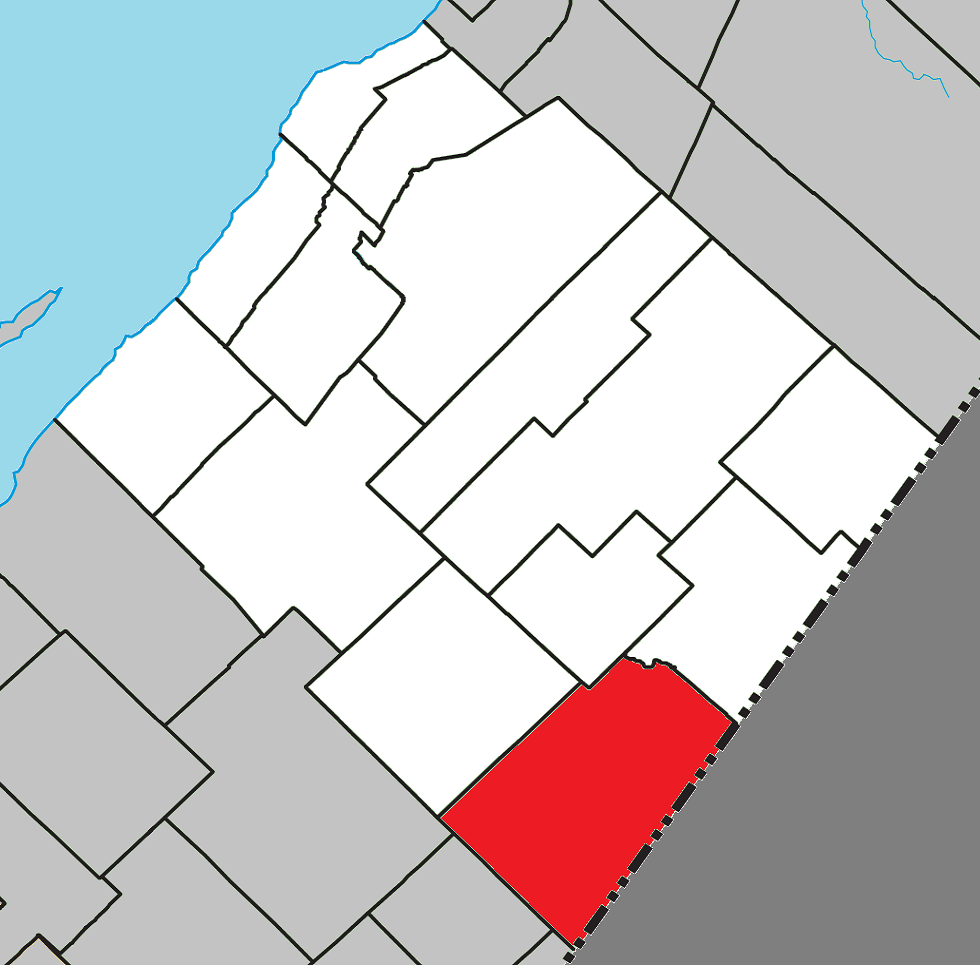
- Location within L'Islet RCM

- Location in southern Quebec
- Coordinates: 46°52′N 69°54′W
- Country: Canada
- Province: Quebec
- Region: Chaudière-Appalaches
- RCM: L'Islet
- Constituted: August 26, 1911

Government
  - Mayor: René Laverdière
  - Federal riding: Côte-du-Sud—Rivière-du-Loup—Kataskomiq—Témiscouata
  - Prov. riding: Côte-du-Sud

Area
  - Total: 217.90 km^{2} (84.13 sq mi)
  - Land: 216.16 km^{2} (83.46 sq mi)

Population (2021)
  - Total: 460
  - Density: 2.1/km^{2} (5.4/sq mi)
  - Pop 2016-2021: ▼9.8%
  - Dwellings: 251
- Time zone: UTC−5 (EST)
  - Summer (DST): UTC−4 (EDT)
- Postal code(s): G0R 2M0
- Area codes: 418 and 581
- Highways: R-204; R-285
- Website: www.saintadalbert.qc.ca

Saint-Adalbert (French pronunciation: [sɛ̃t‿adalbɛʁ]) is a municipality in Quebec, Canada, on the Canada–United States border.

== See also ==
- L'Islet Regional County Municipality
- Big Black River (Saint John River), a river
- List of municipalities in Quebec
