= Allagash Wilderness Waterway =

Protected area in Maine, United States

- Location within Maine
- Interactive map of Allagash Wilderness Waterway
- Location: Maine North Woods, Maine, United States
- Coordinates: 46°29′35″N 69°17′23″W
- Length: 92.5 mi (148.9 km)
- Elevation: 597 ft (182 m)
- Established: 1966
- Administrator: Maine Department of Agriculture, Conservation and Forestry
- Website: Official website

National Wild and Scenic Rivers System
- Type: Wild
- Designated: July 19, 1970

The Allagash Wilderness Waterway is a 92.5-mile-long (148.9 km) protected area extending from Aroostook County, Maine into Piscataquis County, Maine. It is a ribbon of lakes, ponds, rivers, and streams of the Maine North Woods that includes much of the Allagash River. Canoeing, fishing, hunting, and camping are among the activities permitted.

== History ==
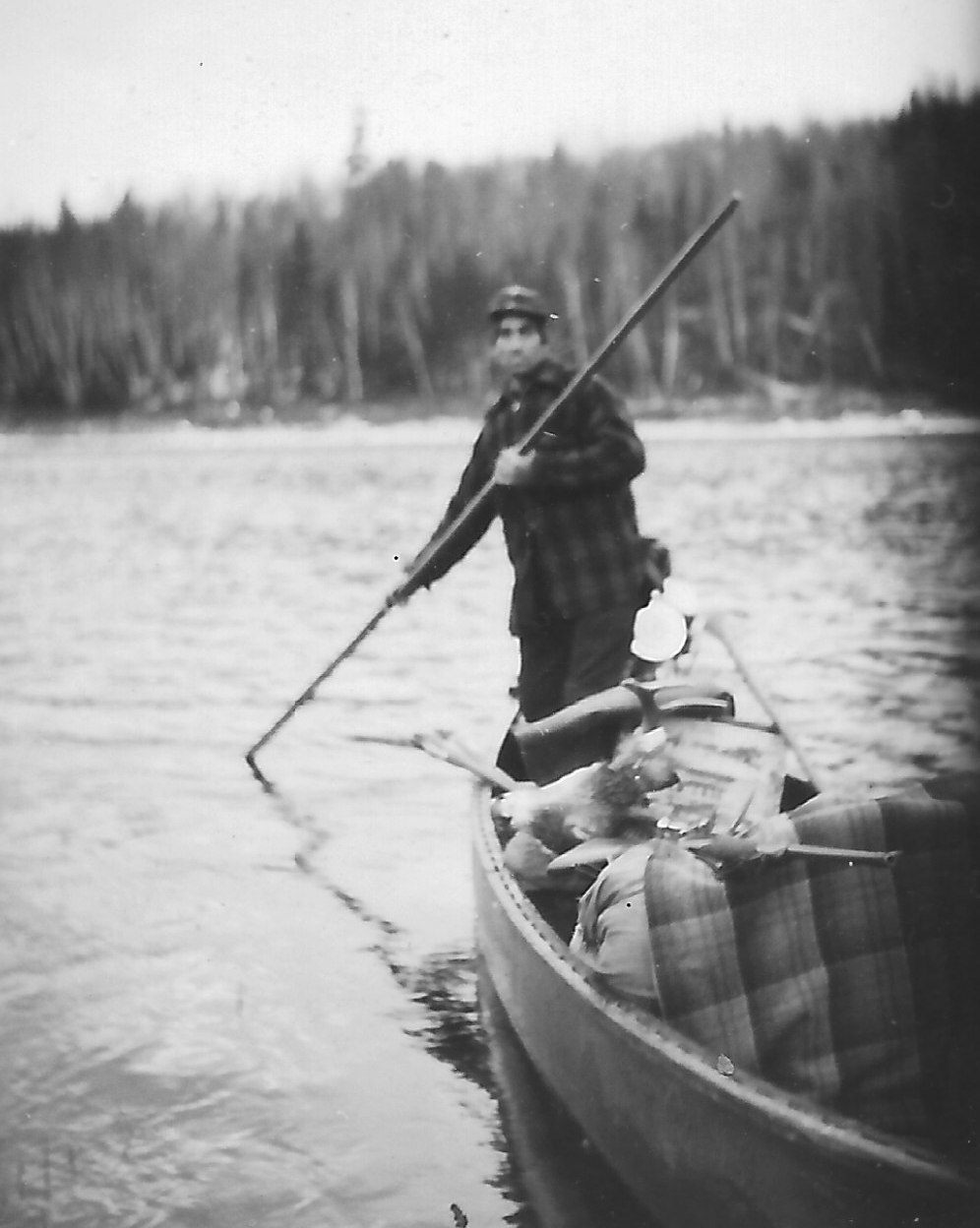
Maine game warden Dave Jackson poling a canoe on the Allagash River a quarter-century before designation of the Allagash Wilderness Waterway

The waterway was traveled by the Wolastoqiyik first nation prior to arrival of Europeans, and was a source of furs as trade with European fish-drying outports became important through the 16th and 17th centuries. Native Americans retained control of the region as a no-man's land between French and English forces through the French and Indian Wars and sheltered some Acadians from expulsion as the Kingdom of Great Britain gained control of surrounding areas.

The waterway remained an unmapped borderland separating rebellious from loyalist colonies through the American Revolution. The boundary of independence as defined by the Treaty of Paris (1783) encouraged both United States and Canadian claims to spruce forests along the Allagash River as logging moved inland from the Atlantic coast. Much of the waterway had been logged before United States control was affirmed by the Webster–Ashburton Treaty in 1842. Édouard Lacroix began cutting second-growth hardwood and pulpwood in 1926, employing about three-thousand French Canadians living in fifty scattered logging camps accessed via the unpaved Lacroix road from Lac-Frontière, Quebec. Many of these lumberjacks were unfamiliar with Maine laws, unable to read English, and accustomed to animal trapping and hunting for food.

In 1929, Dave Jackson was employed as a Maine game warden assigned to live and work out of a small 255 square feet (23.7 m^{2}) cabin on Umsaskis Lake. He made patrols lasting up to ten-days on snowshoes through the winter months and by canoe or on foot during the summer. He routinely took canvas canoes through rapids at the mouth of the Allagash and both upstream and downstream through Big Black Rapids on the Saint John River. As a boy, Dave had freighted supplies up the Saint John River in pine pirogues from the Bangor and Aroostook Railroad at Saint Francis, Maine. His canoe skill on the waterway is still remembered.
