= Big Black River (Saint John River tributary) =

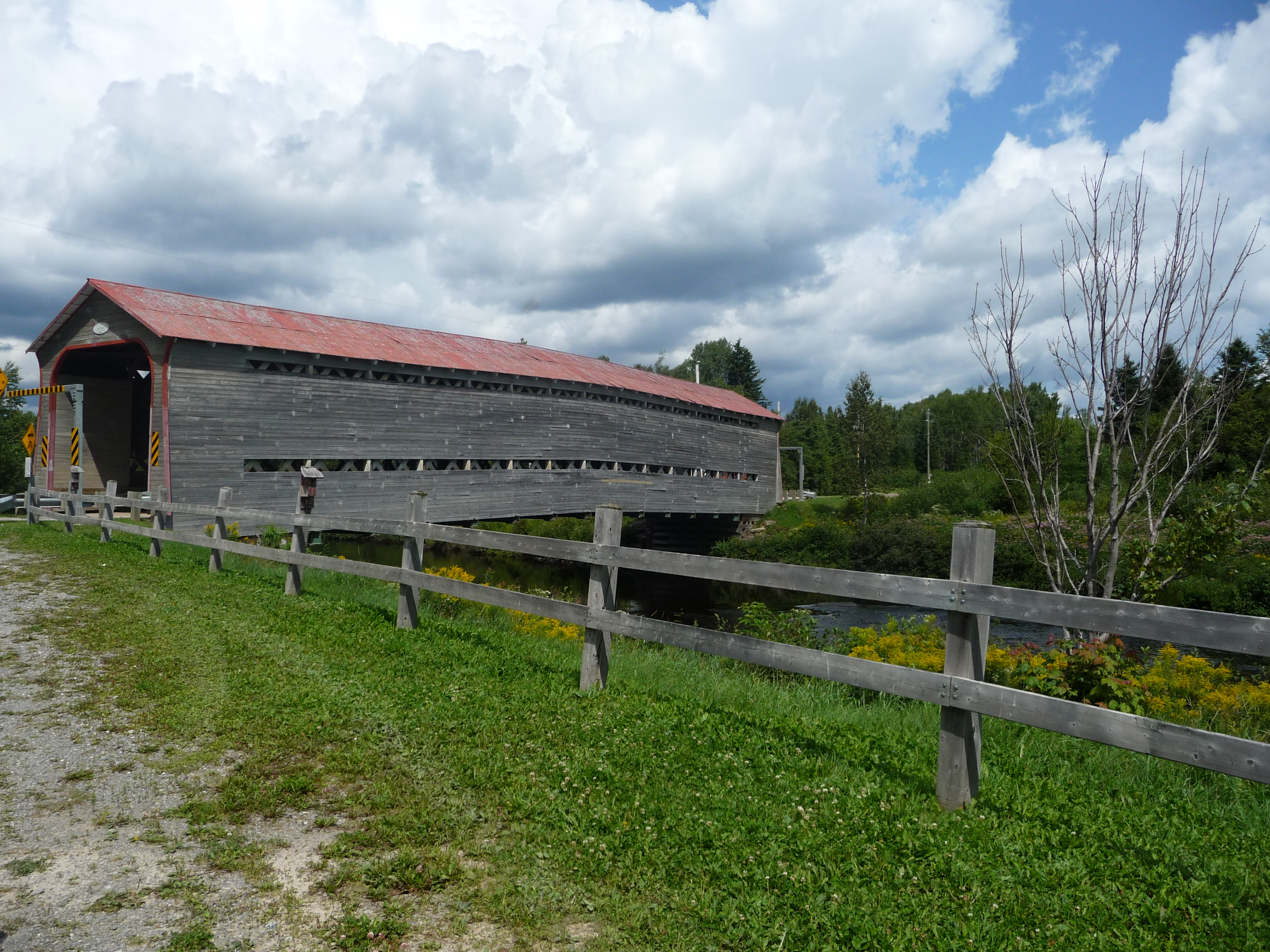

Location
- Countries: Canada and the United States
- Province and state: Quebec and Maine
- Quebec and Maine administrative region: Chaudière-Appalaches and North Maine Woods

Physical characteristics
- Source
  - location: Sainte-Lucie-de-Beauregard, Quebec, L'Islet Regional County Municipality, Chaudière-Appalaches, Quebec, Canada
  - coordinates: 46°52′38″N 70°10′06″W
  - elevation: 380 metres (1,250 ft)
- Mouth
  - location: Township T15 R13 WELS, Aroostook County, Maine, United States
  - coordinates: 46°56′59″N 69°26′55″W
  - elevation: 231 metres (758 ft)
- Length: 77.9 km (48.4 mi)
- Discharge
  - location: Saint John River (Bay of Fundy)

Basin features
- Tributaries
  - left: (from the mouth) in Maine: Twomile brook, Fivemile brook, Shields Branch, discharge of Charles Pond, St Amants Brook, Good Brook; in Quebec:rivière à la Truite (Grande rivière Noire), rivière Grand Calder, rivière Ratsoul, ruisseau de la Fromagerie, rivière Buckley, rivière Rocheuse.
  - right: (from the mouth) in Maine: Conners brook, Depot stream; in Quebec: ruisseau Mort, Grande rivière Noire Est

The Big Black River (French: Grande Rivière Noire) is a river crossing the administrative region of Chaudière-Appalaches in Quebec and in Maine. From its source (46°52′38″N 70°10′6″W), in L'Islet RCM, Quebec, the river runs northeast and east across the Canada–United States border in Maine Township 14, Range 16, WELS, to the Saint John River in Northwest Aroostook T 15, R 13.

The "Big Black River" flows in:

- L'Islet Regional County Municipality: municipality of Sainte-Lucie-de-Beauregard, Quebec, Sainte-Apolline-de-Patton, Quebec, Saint-Adalbert, Quebec, Saint-Marcel, Quebec, Sainte-Félicité, Chaudière-Appalaches, Quebec and Saint-Pamphile, Quebec;
- Aroostook County in North Maine Woods, in Maine: from township T14 R18 WELS up to township T15 R14 WELS.

Maine's all-time lowest officially verified temperature of −50 °F (−46 °C) was recorded at a weather station along the Big Black River on January 16, 2009. The previous record was −48 °F (−44 °C), set at Van Buren, on January 19, 1925.

== Hydrography ==
The "Big Black River" is rooted in the Talon Township in the municipality of Sainte-Lucie-de-Beauregard, Quebec, in Notre Dame Mountains. This source is located at:

- 11.1 kilometres (6.9 mi) at the Northwest of the Canada-US border;
- 8.7 kilometres (5.4 mi) at East of the village center of Sainte-Apolline-de-Patton, Quebec;
- 7.6 kilometres (4.7 mi) at Northwest of the village of Sainte-Lucie-de-Beauregard, Quebec;
- 4.8 kilometres (3.0 mi) at Southeast of bridge of route 132 of the city of Montmagny, Quebec.

From its source, the "Big Black River" flows on 77.9 kilometres (48.4 mi) of which 32.9 kilometres (20.4 mi) in Quebec and 45.0 kilometres (28.0 mi) in Maine, according to the following segments:

Upper course of the Big Black River (segment of 12.2 kilometres (7.6 mi) in Quebec)

- 1.2 kilometres (0.75 mi) to the Northeast in Sainte-Lucie-de-Beauregard, Quebec, up to the boundary of the municipality of Sainte-Apolline-de-Patton, Quebec;
- 0.8 kilometres (0.50 mi) to the Northeast in Sainte-Apolline-de-Patton, Quebec, up to the boundary of the municipality of Saint-Adalbert, Quebec;
- 0.8 kilometres (0.50 mi) to the Northeast, up to the confluence of the Rocky River (Big Black River) (from the West);
- 3.8 kilometres (2.4 mi) to the Northeast, up to the boundary of the municipality of Saint-Marcel, Quebec;
- 1.4 kilometres (0.87 mi) to the Northeast in marsh area up to the confluence of Buckley River (from the North);
- 1.8 kilometres (1.1 mi) to the North-East, up to the route 285 South;
- 2.4 kilometres (1.5 mi) to the Northeast, collecting the waters of the "Fromagerie Creek" up to the confluence of the Grand Black River East;

Intermediate Course of the Great Black River (segment 20.7 kilometres (12.9 mi) to Quebec, downstream of the Grand Black River East)

- 4.5 kilometres (2.8 mi) to the Northeast in Saint-Marcel, Quebec, collecting the waters of Ratsoul Brook, up to the limit of Saint-Adalbert, Quebec;
- 2.6 kilometres (1.6 mi) to the Northeast in Saint-Adalbert, Quebec, collecting the waters of the Dead Creek (from the Southeast) up to the boundary of the municipality of Sainte-Félicité, Chaudière-Appalaches, Quebec;
- 2.6 kilometres (1.6 mi) to the Northeast in Sainte-Félicité, Chaudière-Appalaches, Quebec, up to the confluence of the Grand Calder River;
- 1.9 kilometres (1.2 mi) Eastward up to the boundary of the municipality of Saint-Pamphile, Quebec;
- 5.1 kilometres (3.2 mi) Eastward in Saint-Pamphile, Quebec, with a curve northward to go collect the waters of the Trout River (Grand Black River) up to the bridge of road of "rang Double" (Double range) (route 204 East);
- 1.5 kilometres (0.93 mi) to the Southeast, up to the bridge of the road of "rang Simple" (Single Range) which runs in parallel to the Canada-US border;
- 2.5 kilometres (1.6 mi) to the Southeast, up to the Canada-US border.

Lower course of the Great Black River (segment of 45.0 kilometres (28.0 mi) to Maine downstream of the Canada-US border)

From the Canada-US border, the "Big Black River" flows entirely in forest and mountainous areas of:

- 4.0 kilometres (2.5 mi) to the East in the Township T14 R16 WELS of the Aroostook County, collecting the waters of Good brook, up to the bridge of forest road;
- 5.8 kilometres (3.6 mi) to the Southeast, winding at the end of the segment, up to the river Depot Steam (from the South);
- 12.6 kilometres (7.8 mi) to the East, then North, up to the Shields Branch (extension of Saint Roch River from the Quebec);
- 9.1 kilometres (5.7 mi) to the Southeast, up to a stream (from the South);
- 6.1 kilometres (3.8 mi) to North, up to the confluence of the "Fivemile Brook" (from the Northwest) in the T15 R14 WELS;
- 4.7 kilometres (2.9 mi) Southward, up to Twomile Brook (from the North);
- 2.7 kilometres (1.7 mi) to the Southeast, up to the confluence of the river.

Big Black River empties into a river bend on the West bank of the Saint John River (Bay of Fundy) in the Township T15 R13 WELS. This confluence is located:

- 17.1 kilometres (10.6 mi) to the Southeast of the Canada-US border (Quebec-Maine) up to Saint-Omer, Quebec;
- 50.6 kilometres (31.4 mi) Southwest of the Canada-US border (New Brunswick-Maine) to Saint Francis, Maine.

From the confluence of the "Big Black River", the Saint John River (Bay of Fundy) flows to the East and Northeast through the Maine, then East and Southeast crossing the New Brunswick. Finally, the current empties on the North bank of the Bay of Fundy which opens to the Southwest on the Atlantic Ocean.

== Toponymy ==
The toponym "Grande rivière Noire" (Big Black River) was officialized as of December 5, 1968, at Commission de toponymie du Québec (Quebec Place Names Board).

== See also ==
- Lac-Frontiere, Quebec, a municipality of Quebec
- List of rivers of Maine
- List of rivers of Quebec
