= Allagash River =

River in northern Maine, United States

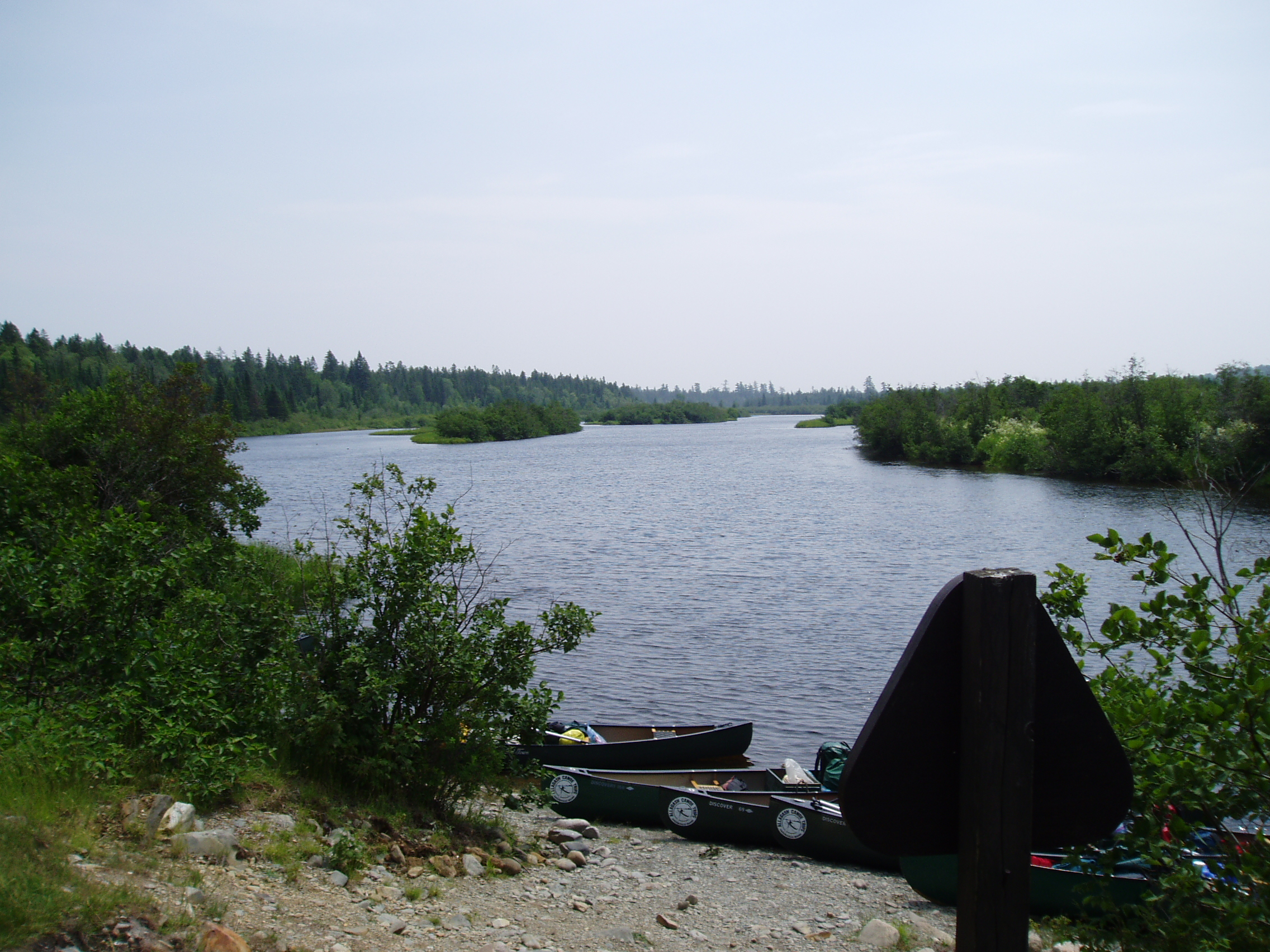

- Location of mouth

Location
- Country: United States
- State: Maine
- Region: New England

Physical characteristics
- Source: Churchill Lake
  - coordinates: 46°29′33″N 69°17′17″W
  - elevation: 930 ft (280 m)
- Mouth: Saint John River
  - coordinates: 47°05′08″N 69°02′40″W
  - elevation: 591 ft (180 m)
- Length: 65 mi (105 km)
- Basin size: 1,479 sq mi (3,830 km^{2})
- Discharge
  - location: river mile 3, near Allagash, ME
  - average: 1,967 cu ft/s (55.7 m^{3}/s)
  - minimum: 87 cu ft/s (2.5 m^{3}/s)
  - maximum: 40,900 cu ft/s (1,160 m^{3}/s)

National Wild and Scenic River
- Type: Wild
- Designated: July 19, 1970
- Part of: Allagash Wilderness Waterway

The Allagash River is a tributary of the Saint John River, approximately 65 miles (105 km) long, in northern Maine in the United States. It drains in a remote and scenic area of wilderness in the Maine North Woods north of Mount Katahdin. The name "Allagash" comes from the Abenaki language, a dialect of the Algonquin languages, spoken by the Penobscot Tribe. The word, /walakéskʸihtəkʸ/, means "bark stream".

The Allagash issues from Churchill Lake (formerly known as Heron Lake) at Churchill Depot in northern Piscataquis County. In its natural state, it also drained Allagash, Chamberlain, and Telos lakes, but in the 1840s dams were built which diverted their drainage into the East Branch of the Penobscot River, to facilitate the shipping of logs south to coastal Maine. Lock Dam drains some water from Chamberlain Lake into the south end of Eagle Lake, which then flows out through the Allagash as it naturally would. Extending the flowline of the Allagash River to Lock Dam on Chamberlain Lake gives a total length to the mouth of the Allagash at the Saint John River of 86 miles (138 km).

The Allagash flows generally northeast, passing through a chain of natural mountain lakes. It joins the Saint John from the south at Allagash, Maine, near the international border with New Brunswick. The relatively unspoiled nature of the river has long made it a popular destination for canoe trips. In 1857 Henry David Thoreau, along with his Concord friend Edward S. Hoar and Penobscot guide Joseph Polis, made a canoe journey which led him to the source of the river, i.e. Heron Lake. His account of the excursion called "The Allegash and East Branch" was published posthumously as the third chapter of The Maine Woods (1864).

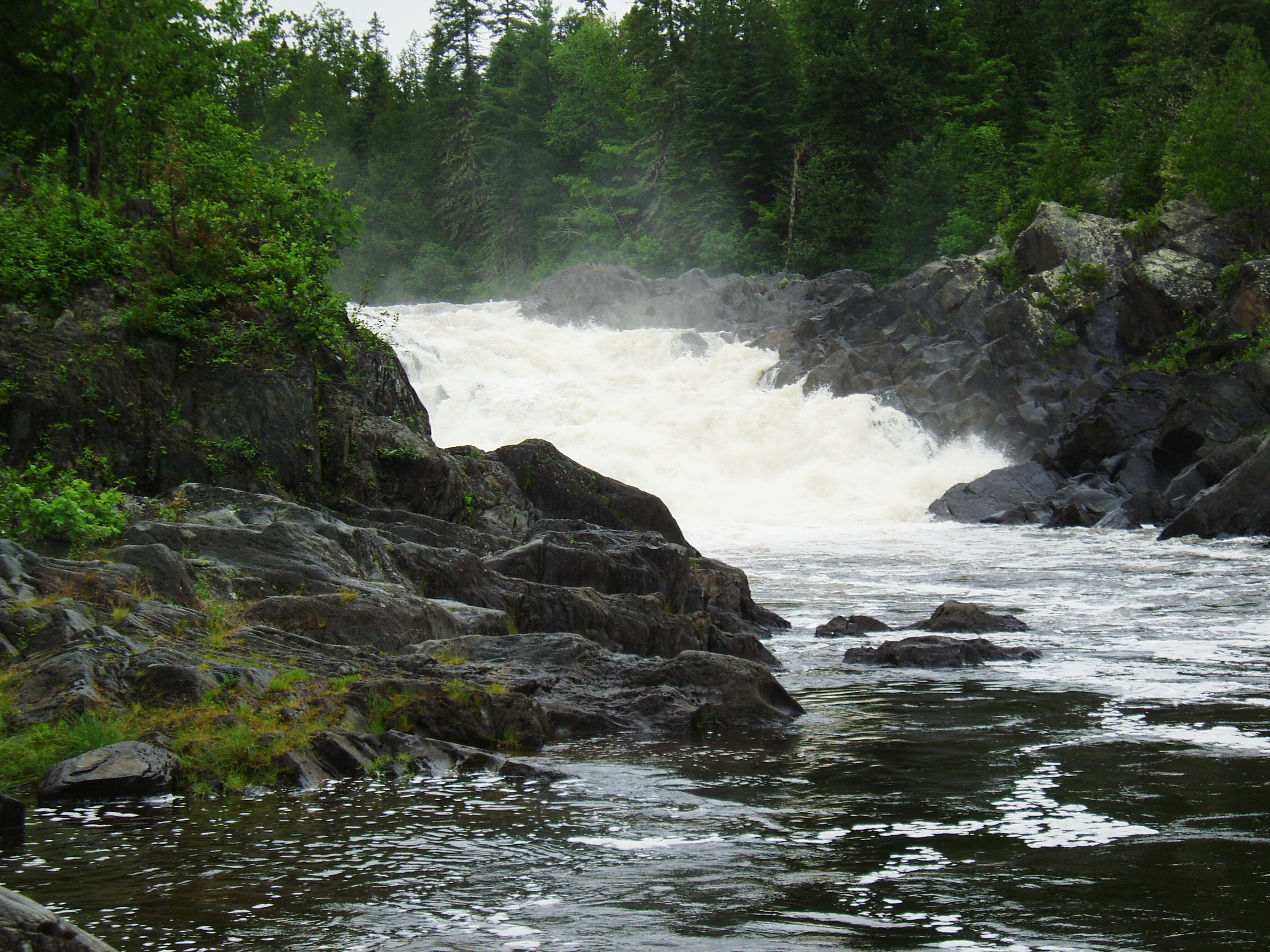
Allagash Falls

In 1966, the citizens of Maine voted to protect the river by authorizing a $1.5 million bond that would "develop the maximum wilderness character" of the river. Much of the river was subsequently designated as the Allagash Wilderness Waterway. In 1970 the waterway became part of the National Wild and Scenic River program of the U.S. federal government. Although the wild designation of the river is normally applied to free-flowing streams, the designation left in place the wooden Churchill Dam for historic reasons. In the 1990s, with the dam failing, the citizens of Maine authorized a concrete replacement for the dam to preserve the nearby recreational facilities on the river. The rebuilding of the dam was highly criticized by environmentalists. The expansion of recreational access to the river through new roads and docks has remained a controversial topic in recent years.

Development in much of the area surrounding the Allagash Wilderness Waterway is restricted by the Seven Islands Land Company, a private land management company that owns approximately 1 million acres (4,000 km^{2}) of forest in northern Maine.

The United States government maintains one stream gauge on the Allagash, located 3 miles (4.8 km) above the river's mouth near Allagash, Maine (47°04′14″N 69°04′51″W), at which point the watershed is 1,479 square miles (3,830 km^{2}). The river's discharge (flow) at this gauge averages 1,967 cubic feet per second (55.7 m^{3}/s), with a recorded maximum of 40,900 cubic feet per second (1,160 m^{3}/s) and minimum of 87 cubic feet per second (2.5 m^{3}/s). Annual maximum flows occur during the spring snow melt and minimums in the fall.
