= North Maine Woods =

Northern geographic area of the state of Maine

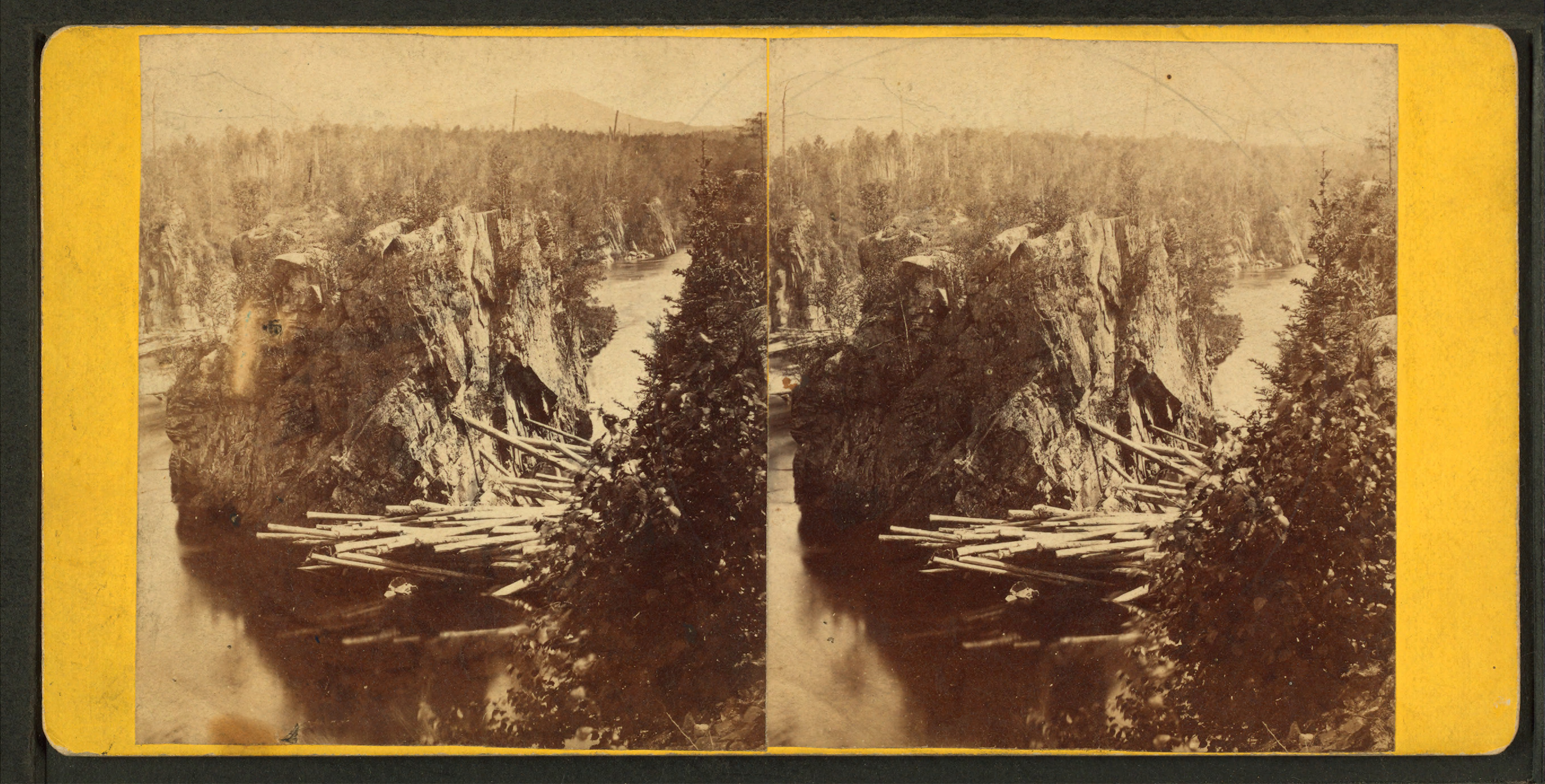
Log jam at Ripogenus Gorge during 1870s log driving

The North Maine Woods is the northern geographic area of the state of Maine in the United States. The thinly populated region is overseen by a combination of private individual and private industrial owners and state government agencies, and is divided into 155 unincorporated townships within the NMW management area. There are no towns or paved roads.

The region covers more than 3.5 million acres (14,000 km^{2}) of forest land bordered by Canada to the west and north and by the early 20th century transportation corridors of the Canadian Pacific International Railway of Maine to the south and the Bangor and Aroostook Railroad Ashland branch to the east. It includes western Aroostook and northern Somerset, Penobscot, and Piscataquis counties. Much of the woods are currently owned by timber corporations, including Seven Islands Land Company, Plum Creek, Maibec, Orion Timberlands and J. D. Irving. Ownership changes hands quite frequently and is often difficult to determine.

Its main products are timber for pulp and lumber, and the area is used for hunting and outdoor recreation.

Included within its boundaries are two wild rivers of the Northeastern United States: the Saint John and the Allagash. The North Maine Woods completely surrounds the Allagash Wilderness Waterway.

== History ==
Early European settlement of New England and Atlantic Canada was along the Atlantic coast. Some of these newcomers focused on fishing and shipbuilding while others cleared forests for conversion to farmland. Trees from the cleared forests provided lumber for homes, barns, and ships to support the fishing industry and European trade. As the coastal forests were cleared, settlers moved inland along the major rivers from the Hudson River north to the Saint Lawrence River. Early interior settlers spent the short summers growing food and the long winters cutting trees. Logs in excess of those needed to build farming structures could be floated downstream and sold to sawmills. Cities like Bangor, Maine, on the Penobscot River and Saint John, New Brunswick, on the Saint John River developed at the head of navigation where sawmills converted logs to lumber and shipyards converted lumber to ships.

Prior to invention of railroads, industrial investment in these cities depended upon anticipated forest resources available to be floated down river. Competition for upper Saint John River watershed forests developed in the 1830s when Bangor interests purchased land containing headwaters lakes and altered Chamberlain Lake to drain into the Penobscot River. This competition was resolved by the Webster–Ashburton Treaty giving Maine control of what became the North Maine Woods.

== Flora and fauna ==
The North Maine Woods are part of the New England-Acadian forests ecoregion. They are predominantly forestland consisting of mixed northern hardwoods and conifers, much of it artificially planted after harvesting by the various landowners. The major tree species are balsam fir, black spruce, and northern white cedar with smaller numbers of white spruce, yellow birch, paper birch, quaking aspen, eastern white pine, speckled alder, eastern hemlock, and black ash.

The area is also home to white-tailed deer, moose, black bears, bobcat, coyotes, red fox, fisher, otter, mink, marten, weasel, beavers, porcupine, muskrat, red squirrel, and snowshoe hare.

Common birds include olive-sided flycatcher, white-throated sparrow, wood duck, common yellowthroat, spotted sandpiper, red-eyed vireo, American robin, common loon, belted kingfisher, bufflehead, least flycatcher, yellow-billed cuckoo, wood thrush, common merganser, black-capped chickadee, Canada jay, ruffed grouse, and spruce grouse.

There are official hunting seasons for ruffed grouse, deer, and bear, with a state-run lottery system for awarding moose-hunting licences. Char, including squaretail, togue, and isolated populations of blueback trout are the best known fish of the rivers and lakes. The Muskellunge is a non-native fish that has spread throughout the Saint Johns River watershed. Black fly, mosquito, deer fly, and midge populations can be significant from late spring through early autumn. The Maine North Woods are also home to the endangered Canada lynx, bald eagle and the Furbish lousewort, a rare plant that is found only in the Saint John River Valley. Animals that have disappeared from the woods during European settlement include caribou and gray wolf.

== Folklore ==
Early 19th century logging of the North Maine woods employed native Maliseet, English settlers from the Atlantic coast, French Canadians from the Saint Lawrence River valley, and some unskilled laborers recruited from large eastern cities. Unique mythology evolved in the remote logging camps from hazing new employees or attempts by competing groups to dominate the resource extraction labor market. Two birds held special significance. The relatively tame gray jays would follow loggers through the woods in the hope of stealing unwatched food but were not harmed because they were believed to be the spirits of deceased woodsmen. Some French Canadians would quit work if a white owl was seen flying from a tree they were felling, for they believed it was a ghost who would haunt them unless they left that part of the woods.

Mythical creatures of the north woods:

- Razor-Shins was an immortal humanoid with sharp shin bones and a thirst for liquor in the prohibition state of Maine. New employees were encouraged to leave a jug of Bangor whisky outside of the camp door on the night of the full moon. If Razor-Shins emptied the jug by morning, he might use his razor-sharp shinbones to fell a tree for the new man. But there were tales of new employees caught in the woods by Razor-Shins and scalped or otherwise mutilated after failing to offer the customary tribute.
- Will-am-alones were squirrel-like creatures said to roll poisonous lichen into small balls and drop them onto the eyelids or into the ears of sleeping men. The lichen balls were reputed to cause headaches and visual hallucinations the following day. The effects seemed most evident among men who had consumed illegal liquor.
- Windigo (or "Indian devil") was described as a huge, shadowy humanoid with a voice like the moaning of the wind through the pine boughs, but known only by his tracks through the snow. Each footprint was 24 inches (61 cm) long and resembled a snowshoe imprint with a red spot in the center where blood had oozed through a hole in his moccasin. Some feared to cross his tracks and claimed looking upon Windigo would seal their doom.
- Ding-ball or Dingmaul was a cougar whose last tail joint was ball-shaped and bare of hair and flesh. Ding-ball was fond of human flesh and would sing with a human voice to lure the incautious out of their cabins at night where it waited in the darkness to crack their skulls with its tail.
- Pamoola or Pomola (not to be confused with the bird spirit of a similar name of the same region) was a sabertooth cat-like predator with four tusks that feasted on both animals and Indians alike but fears White men. It can only be slain by lightning strikes as conventional weapons can’t bring one down, similar to the Nemean lion of Greco-Roman mythology.

== National monument ==
On August 24, 2016, President Obama signed an executive order designating 87,000 acres (350 km^{2}) to the east of Baxter State Park as the Katahdin Woods and Waters National Monument. The previous day Roxanne Quimby transferred that land to the U.S. Department of the Interior.

The move followed a long debate about whether and how to preserve parts of the North Maine Woods.

Americans for a Maine Woods National Park, an interest group that includes scientists, educators, environmentalists and celebrities, has long pushed to turn as much as 3.2 million acres (13,000 km^{2}) into a national park. The proposed park is controversial among residents within or adjacent to the park's proposed borders. Many fear the dislocation of traditional industries and recreational activities as a result of a park's creation. The County Commissions from Aroostook, Piscataquis, and Somerset have voted to oppose efforts to create a park. A local group, the Maine Woods Coalition, was organized to oppose the effort. As of 2022, no further action has been taken by the United States Congress on this matter.

Maine's congressional delegation, with the exception of Democratic Rep. Chellie Pingree who represents southern Maine, have in the past expressed "serious reservations" about executive action to create a national monument. Former Gov. Paul LePage has expressed strong opposition to the idea, and has proposed legislation to attempt to block the transfer of land to the federal government for a national monument. LePage has also ordered the Maine Bureau of Parks and Lands to re-establish and maintain access to approximately 2,500 acres (10 km^{2}) of state-owned land within a proposed park. Supporters of a park, while conceding the state has a right to access its land, criticized the move as an effort to interfere with private landowners deciding what to do with their land.

== In popular culture ==
North Maine Woods is the setting for the 2020 film Blood and Money.

== See also ==
- Aroostook War
- Conservation movement
- Eagle Lake and West Branch Railroad
- Hundred-Mile Wilderness
- Saint John Plantation, Maine
