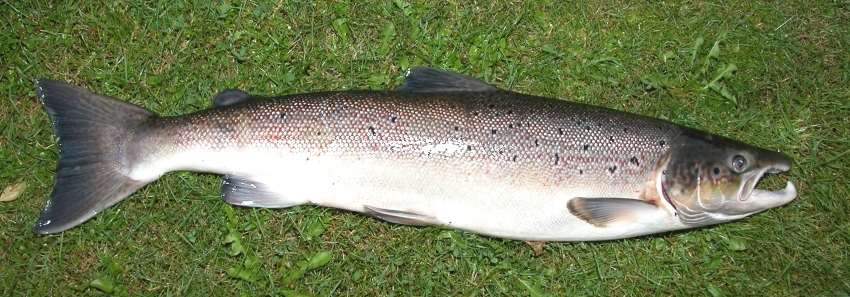
- Breeding male, caught in Germany
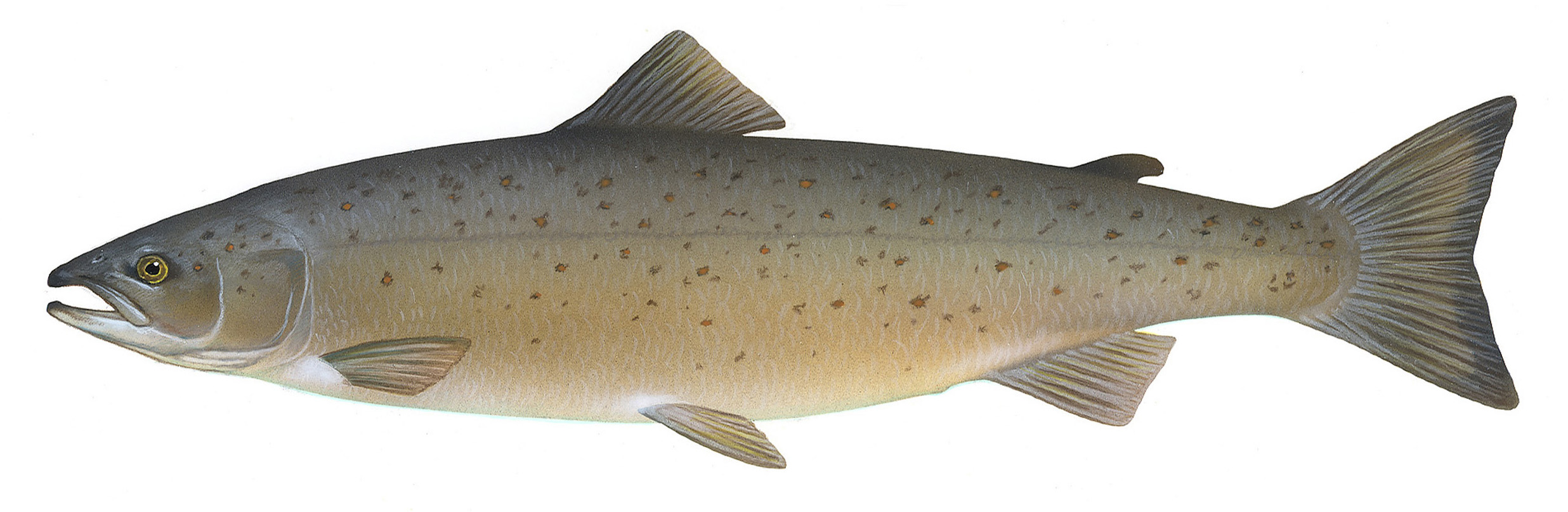
- Illustration

Conservation status
- Near Threatened (IUCN 3.1)

Scientific classification
- Kingdom: Animalia
- Phylum: Chordata
- Class: Actinopterygii
- Division: Teleostei
- Order: Salmoniformes
- Family: Salmonidae
- Genus: Salmo
- Species: S. salar

Binomial name
- Salmo salar Linnaeus, 1758
- Distribution of Atlantic salmon

= Atlantic salmon =

Species of fish

The Atlantic salmon (Salmo salar) is a species of ray-finned fish in the family Salmonidae. It is the third largest of the Salmonidae, behind Siberian taimen and Pacific Chinook salmon, growing up to 1 m (3.3 ft) in length. Atlantic salmon are found in the northern Atlantic Ocean and in rivers that flow into it. Most populations are anadromous, hatching in streams and rivers but moving out to sea as they grow where they mature, after which the adults seasonally move upstream again to spawn.

When the mature fish re-enter rivers to spawn, they change in colour and appearance. Some populations of this fish only migrate to large lakes, and are "landlocked", spending their entire lives in freshwater. Such populations are found throughout the range of the species. Unlike Pacific species of salmon, S. salar is iteroparous, which means it can survive spawning and return to sea to repeat the process again in another year with 5–10% returning to the sea to spawn again. Such individuals can grow to extremely large sizes, although they are rare. The different life stages of the fish are known by several different names in English; alevin, fry, parr and smolt.

Atlantic salmon meat is a particularly nutritious food and is considered one of the more refined types of fish meat in many cultures. As such it features in numerous popular traditional cuisines and can fetch a higher price than some other fish. It has thus long been the target of recreational and commercial fishing, and this, as well as habitat destruction, has impacted the population in some areas. As a result, the species is the subject of conservation efforts in several countries, which appear to have been somewhat successful since the 2000s. Techniques to farm this species using aquacultural methods have also been developed, and at present it is farmed in great numbers in many countries, with Norway producing over 50% of the farmed world supply. Although this is now a viable alternative to wild-caught fish, farming methods have attracted criticism from environmentalists.

== Nomenclature ==
The Atlantic salmon was given its scientific binomial name by Swedish zoologist and taxonomist Carl Linnaeus in 1758. The name, Salmo salar, derives from the Latin salmo, meaning salmon, and salar, meaning leaper, according to M. Barton, but more likely meaning "resident of salt water". Lewis and Short's Latin Dictionary (Clarendon Press, Oxford, 1879) translates salar as a kind of trout from its use in the Idylls of the poet Ausonius (4th century CE). Later, the differently coloured smolts were found to be the same species.

Other names used for the Atlantic salmon are: bay salmon, black salmon, caplin-scull salmon, fiddler, sebago salmon, silver salmon, outside salmon and winnish. At different points in their maturation and life cycle, they are known as parr, smolt, grilse, grilt, kelt, slink, and spring salmon. Atlantic salmon that do not journey to sea are known as landlocked salmon.

== Description ==
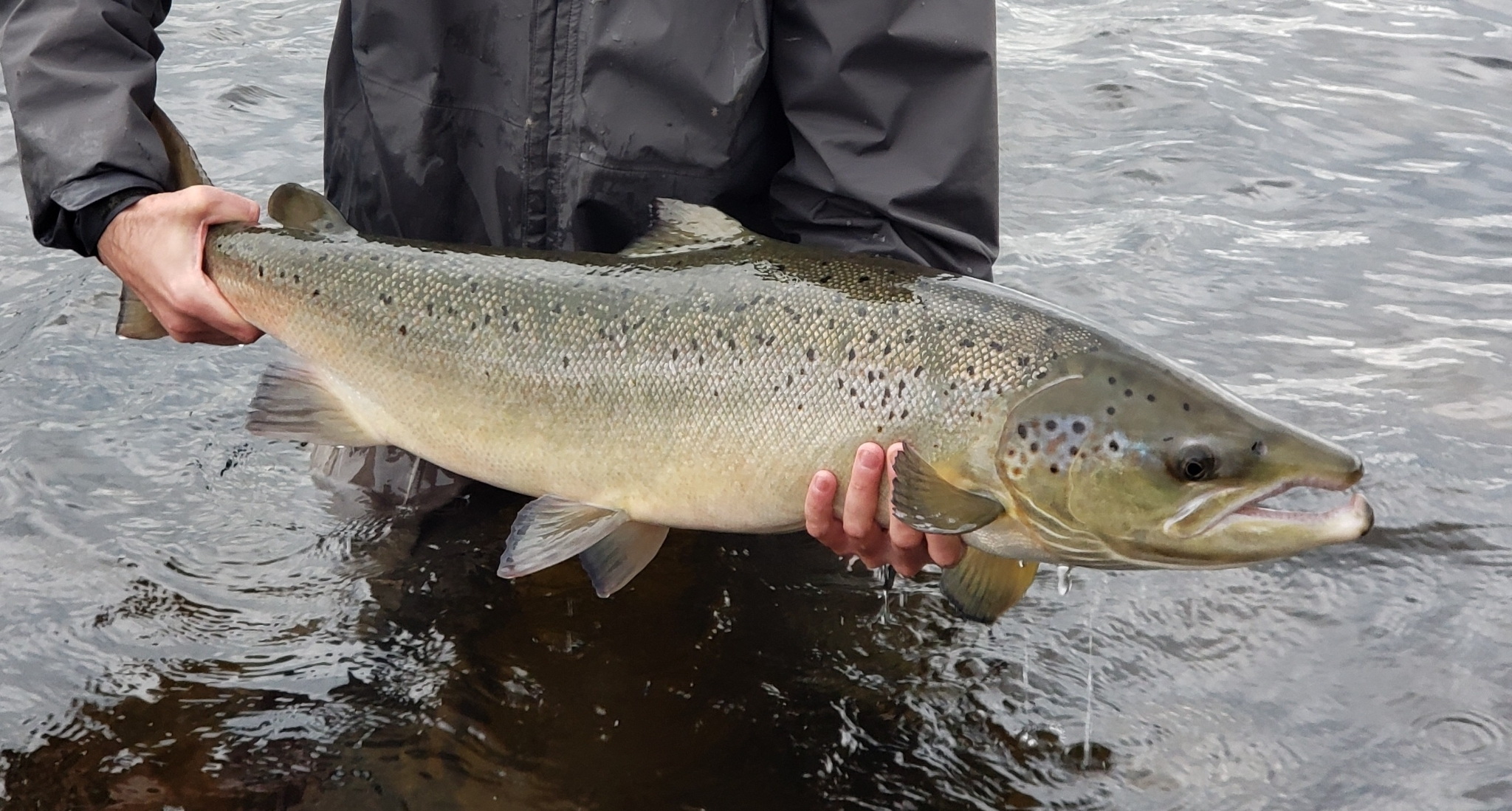
In Québec, showing the kype characteristic of breeding males

Atlantic salmon are the largest species in the genus Salmo. After two years at sea, the fish average 71 to 76 cm (28 to 30 in) in length and 3.6 to 5.4 kg (7.9 to 11.9 lb) in weight. Specimens that spend four or more winters feeding at sea, or are repeat spawners, can be much larger. An Atlantic salmon netted in 1960 in Scotland, in the estuary of the river Hope, weighed 49.44 kg (109.0 lb), the heaviest recorded in all available literature. Another netted in 1925 in Norway measured 160.65 cm (63.25 in) in length, the longest Atlantic salmon on record.

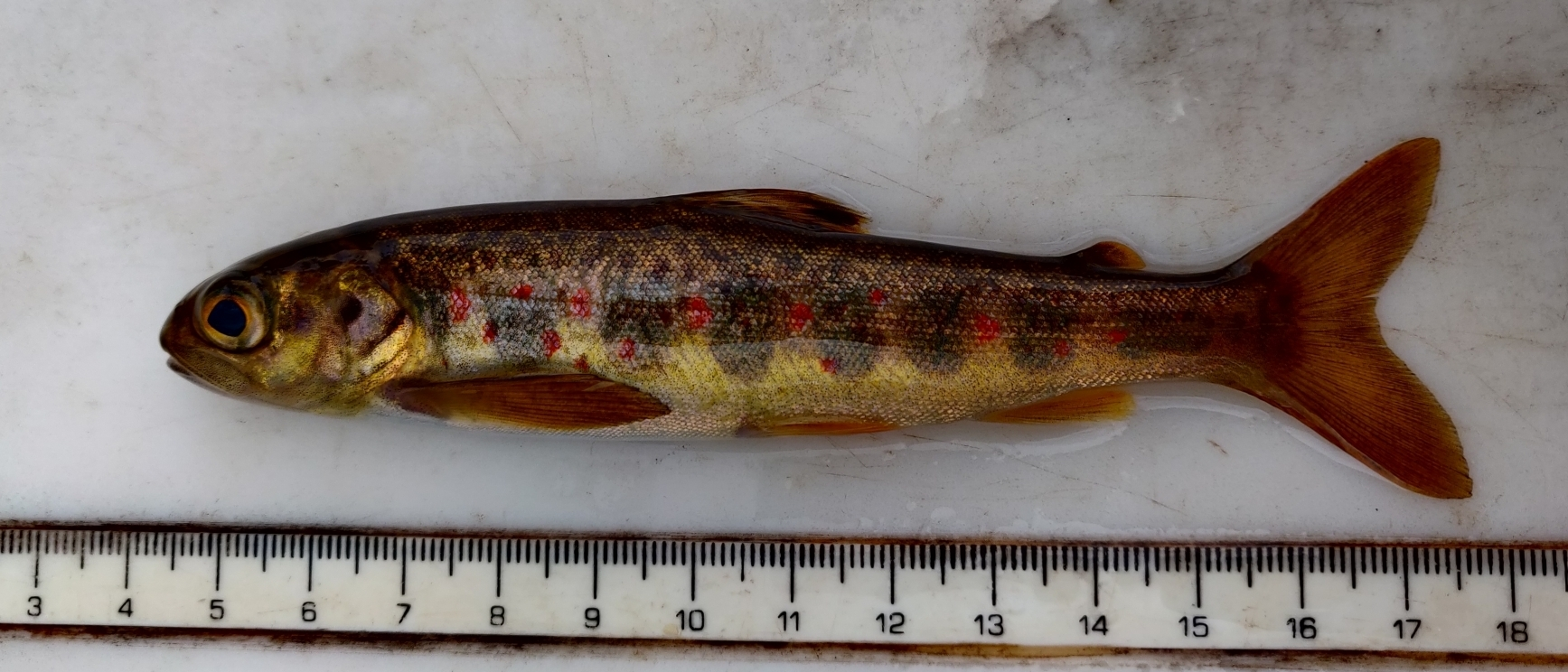
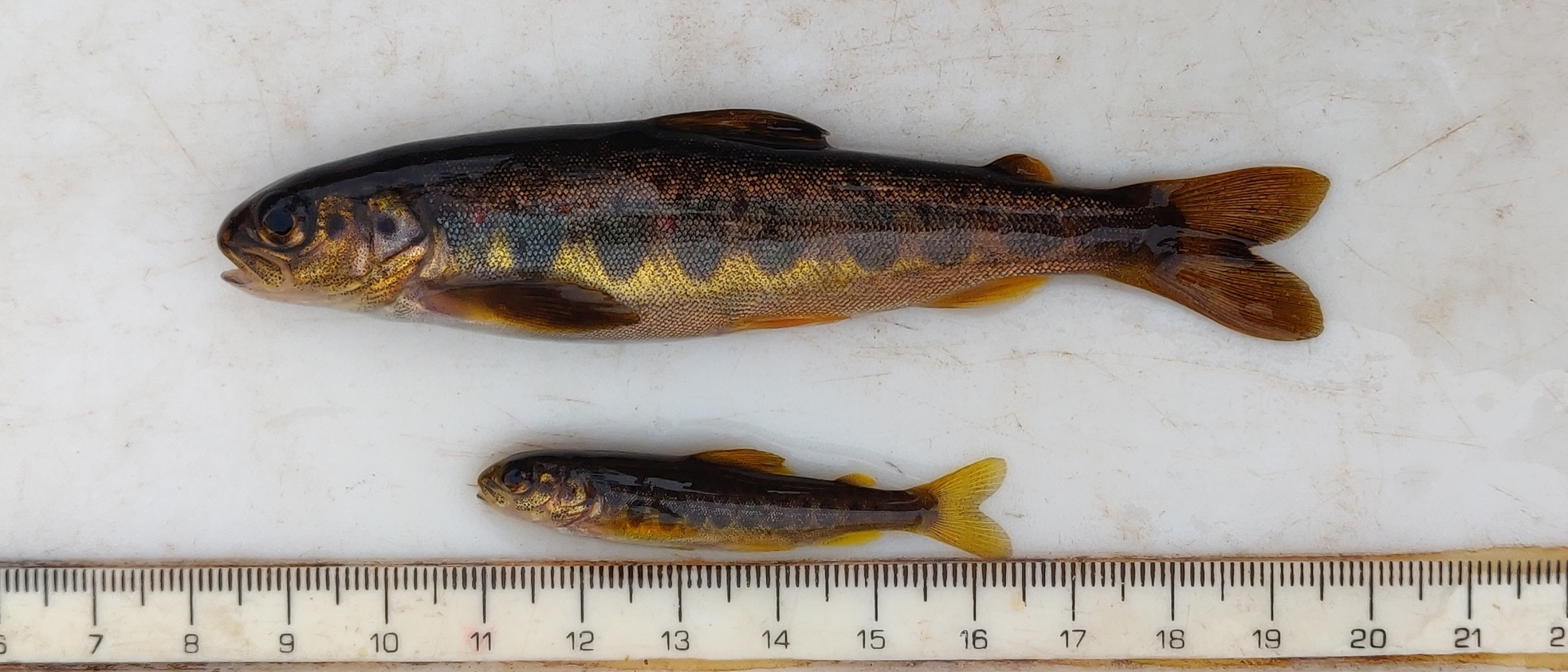
Juveniles of various sizes, in Scotland

The colour of young Atlantic salmon does not resemble the adult stage. While they live in fresh water, they have blue and red spots. At maturity, they take on a silver-blue sheen. The easiest way of identifying them as an adult is by the black spots predominantly above the lateral line, though the caudal fin is usually unspotted. When they reproduce, males take on a slight green or red colour. The salmon has a fusiform body, and well-developed teeth. All fins, except the adipose fin, are bordered with black.

== Distribution and habitat ==
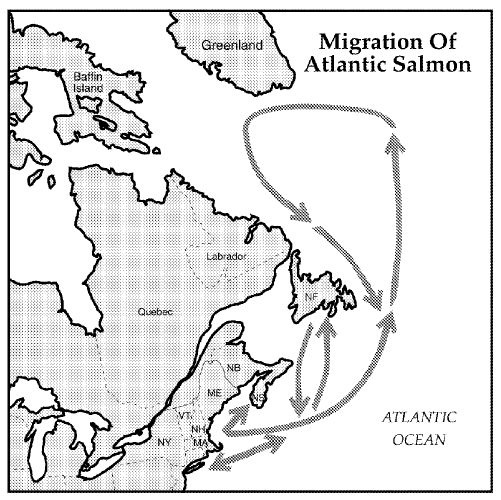
Ocean migration of Atlantic salmon

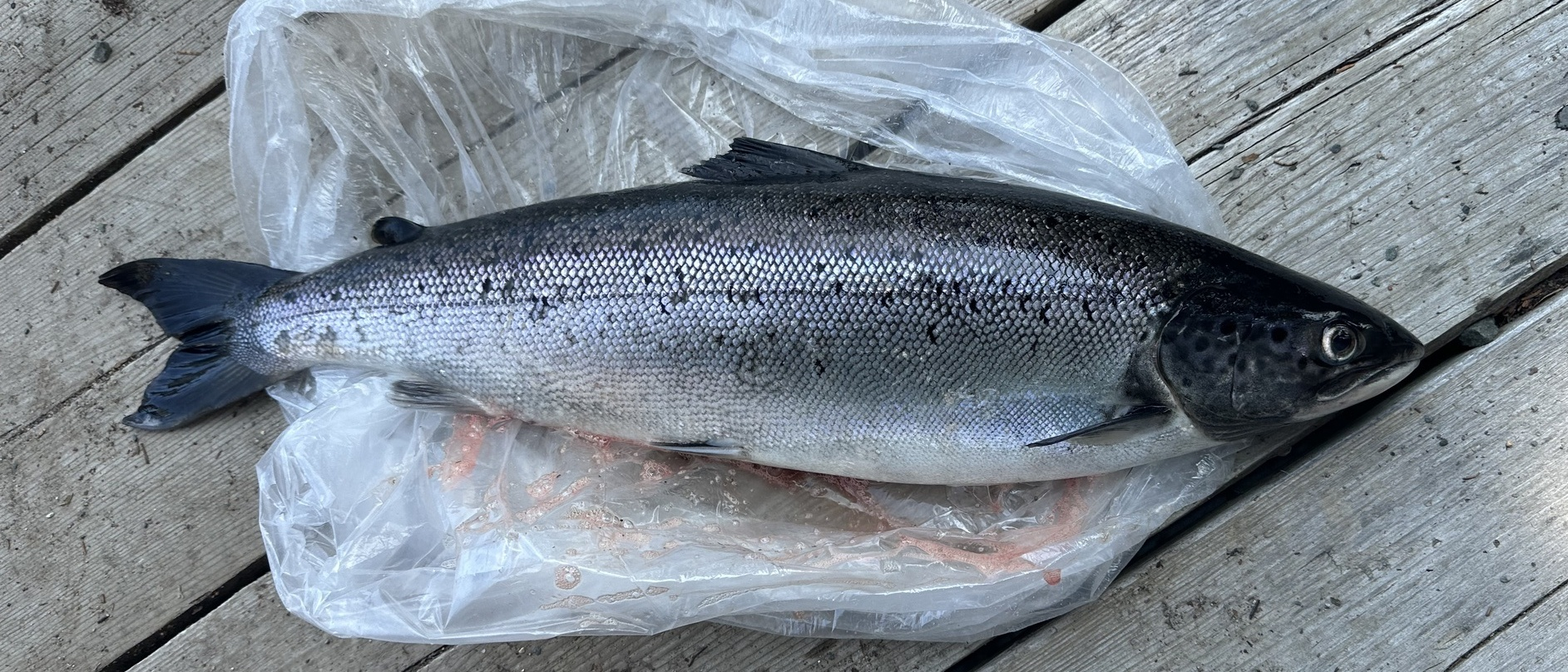
Ocean phase, in Newfoundland

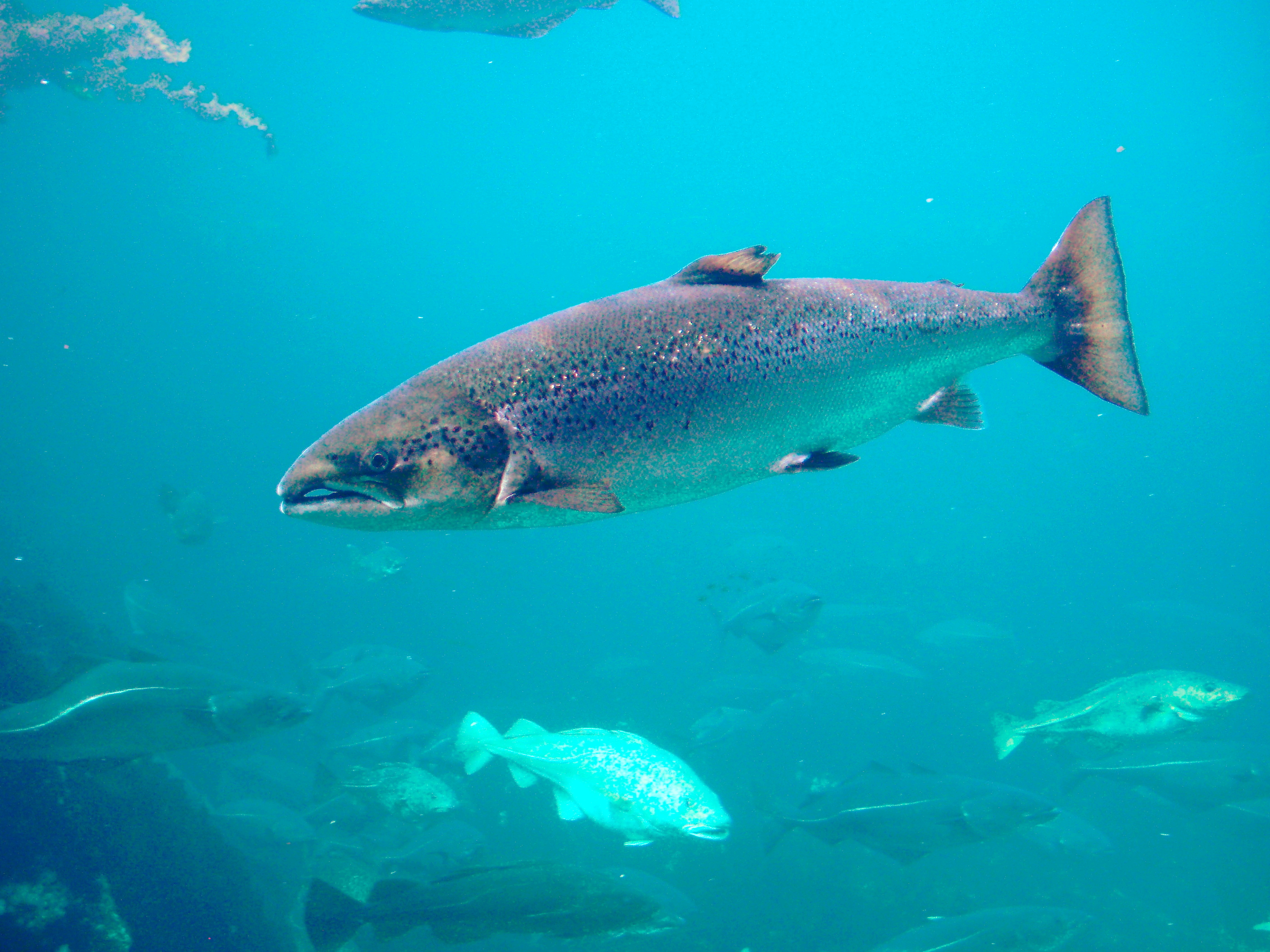
At Atlantic Sea-Park, in Norway

The natural breeding grounds of Atlantic salmon are rivers in Europe and the northeastern coast of North America. In Europe, Atlantic salmon are still found as far south as Spain, and as far northeast as the Pechora River in Russia. Atlantic salmon have spread north to colonise Svalbard (78°N) from 2002–2006 onward, due to the warming of the climate there. Because of sport-fishing, some of the species' southern populations in northern Spain are growing smaller. The species distribution is easily influenced by changes in freshwater habitat and climate. Atlantic salmon are a cold-water fish species and are particularly sensitive to changes in water temperature.

The Housatonic River, and its Naugatuck River tributary, hosted the southernmost Atlantic salmon spawning runs in the United States. However, there is a 1609 account by Henry Hudson that Atlantic salmon once ran up the Hudson River. In addition, fish scale evidence dating to 10,000 years BP places Atlantic salmon in a coastal New Jersey pond.

Two publications from 1988 and 1996 questioned the notion that Atlantic salmon were prehistorically plentiful in New England, when the climate was warmer as it is now. This argument was primarily based on a paucity of bone data in archaeological sites relative to other fish species, and the assertion that historical claims of abundance may have been exaggerated. This argument was later challenged in another paper which claimed that lack of archaeological bone fragments could be explained by salmon bones being rare at sites that still have large salmon runs and that salmonid bones in general are poorly recovered relative to other fish species.

Atlantic salmon populations were significantly reduced in the United States following European settlement. The fur trade, timber harvesting, dams and mills and agriculture degraded freshwater habitats and lowered the carrying capacity of most North American streams. Beaver populations were trapped to near-extinction by 1800, and log drives and clear-cutting further exacerbated stream erosion and habitat loss. As timber and fur gave way to agriculture, freshwater Atlantic salmon habitat was further compromised. According to historian D.W. Dunfield (1985) "over half of the historical Atlantic salmon runs had been lost in North America by 1850". As early as 1798, a bill for the preservation of Atlantic Salmon was introduced in Canadian Parliament, to protect populations in Lake Ontario. In the Gulf Region of Nova Scotia it was reported that 31 of the 33 Atlantic salmon streams were blocked off by lumber dams, leading to the extirpation of early-run fish in many watersheds. The inshore Atlantic salmon fishery became a major export of the New World, with major fishing operations establishing along the shores of major river systems. The southernmost populations were the first to disappear.

Young salmon spend one to four years in their natal river. When they are large enough (c. 15 centimetres (5.9 in)), they smoltify, changing camouflage from stream-adapted with large, gray spots to sea-adapted with shiny sides. They also undergo some endocrinological changes to adapt to osmotic differences between fresh water and seawater habitat. When smoltification is complete, the parr (young fish) now begin to swim with the current instead of against it. With this behavioural change, the fish are now referred to as smolt. When the smolt reach the sea, they follow sea surface currents and feed on plankton or fry from other fish species such as herring. During their time at sea, they can sense the change in the Earth magnetic field through iron in their lateral line.

When they have had a year of good growth, they will move to the sea surface currents that transport them back to their natal river. It is a major misconception that salmon swim thousands of kilometres at sea; instead they surf through sea surface currents. It is possible they find their natal river by smell, although this is not confirmed; only 5% of Atlantic salmon go up the wrong river. The range of an individual Atlantic salmon can thus be the river where they are born and the sea surface currents that are connected to that river in a circular path.

Wild salmon continued to disappear from many rivers during the twentieth century due to overfishing and habitat change.

== Ecology ==
=== Diet ===
Young salmon begin a feeding response within a few days. After the yolk sac is absorbed by the body, they begin to hunt. Juveniles start with tiny invertebrates, but as they mature, they may occasionally eat small fish. During this time, they hunt both in the substrate and in the current. Some have been known to eat salmon eggs. Plankton such as euphausiids are important food for pre-grilse but amphipods and decapods are also consumed. The most commonly eaten foods include caddisflies, blackflies, mayflies, stoneflies, and chironomids, as well as terrestrial insects.

As adults, the salmon prefer capelin as their meal of choice. Capelin are elongated silvery fish that grow up to 20–25 centimetres (8–10 in) long. Other fish consumed include herring, alewives, smelts, scomberids, sand lance, and small cod.

=== Behaviour ===
Fry and parr have been said to be territorial, but evidence showing them to guard territories is inconclusive. While they may occasionally be aggressive towards each other, the social hierarchy is still unclear. Many have been found to school, especially when leaving the estuary.

Adult Atlantic salmon are considered much more aggressive than other salmon, and are more likely to attack other fish than others.

=== Life stages ===
Life cycle of Atlantic salmon

Most Atlantic salmon follow an anadromous migration pattern, in that they undergo their greatest feeding and growth in saltwater; however, adults return to spawn in native freshwater streams where the eggs hatch and juveniles grow through several distinct stages.

Atlantic salmon do not require saltwater. Numerous examples of fully freshwater (i.e., "landlocked") populations of the species exist throughout the Northern Hemisphere, including a now extinct population in Lake Ontario, which has been shown in recent studies to have spent its entire life cycle in the watershed of the lake. In North America, the landlocked strains are frequently known as ouananiche.

==== Freshwater phase ====
The freshwater phases of Atlantic salmon vary between two and eight years, according to river location. While the young in southern rivers, such as those to the English Channel, are only one year old when they leave, those further north, such as in Scottish rivers, can be over four years old, and in Ungava Bay, northern Quebec, smolts as old as eight years have been encountered.

The first phase is the alevin stage, when the fish stay in the breeding ground and use the remaining nutrients in their yolk sacs. During this developmental stage, their young gills develop and they become active hunters. Next is the fry stage, where the fish grow and subsequently leave the breeding ground in search of food. During this time, they move to areas with higher prey concentration. The final freshwater stage is when they develop into parr, in which they prepare for the trek to the Atlantic Ocean.

During these times, the Atlantic salmon are very susceptible to predation. Nearly 40% are eaten by trout alone. Other predators include other fish and birds. Egg and juvenile survival is dependent on habitat quality as Atlantic salmon are sensitive to ecological change.

==== Saltwater phases ====
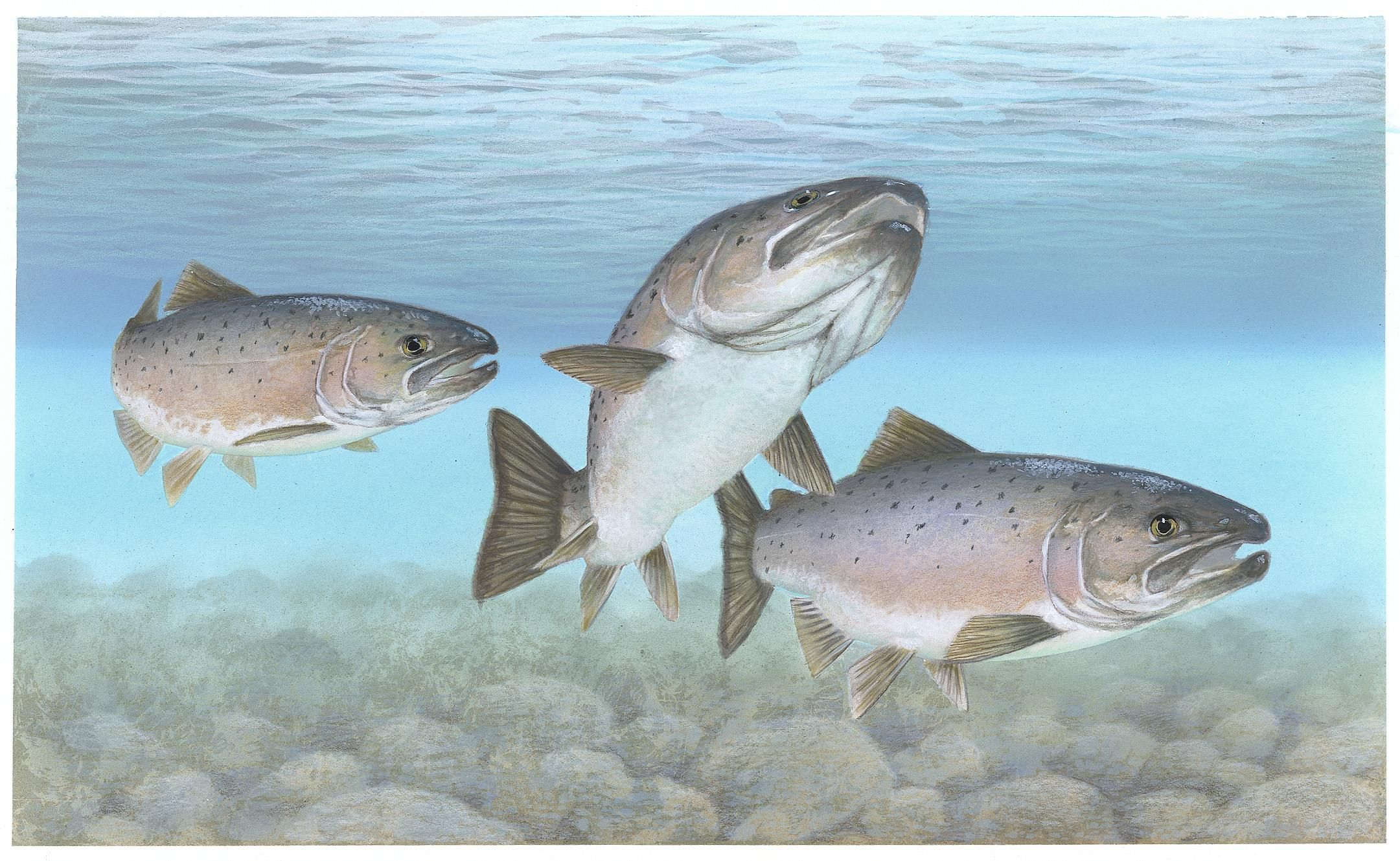
Atlantic salmon are among the largest salmon species.

When parr develop into smolt, they begin the trip to the ocean, which predominantly happens between March and June. Migration allows acclimation to the changing salinity. Once ready, young smolt leave, preferring an ebb tide.

Having left their natal streams, they experience a period of rapid growth during the one to four years they live in the ocean. Typically, Atlantic salmon migrate from their home streams to an area on the continental plate off West Greenland. During this time, they face predation from humans, seals, Greenland sharks, skate, cod, and halibut. Some dolphins have been noticed playing with dead salmon, but it is still unclear whether they consume them.

Once large enough, Atlantic salmon change into the grilse phase, when they become ready to return to the same freshwater tributary they departed from as smolts. After returning to their natal streams, the salmon will cease eating altogether prior to spawning. Although largely unknown, odor – the exact chemical signature of that stream – may play an important role in how salmon return to the area where they hatched. Once heavier than about 250 g, the fish no longer become prey for birds and many fish, although seals do prey upon them. Grey and common seals commonly eat Atlantic salmon. Survivability to this stage has been estimated at between 14 and 53%.

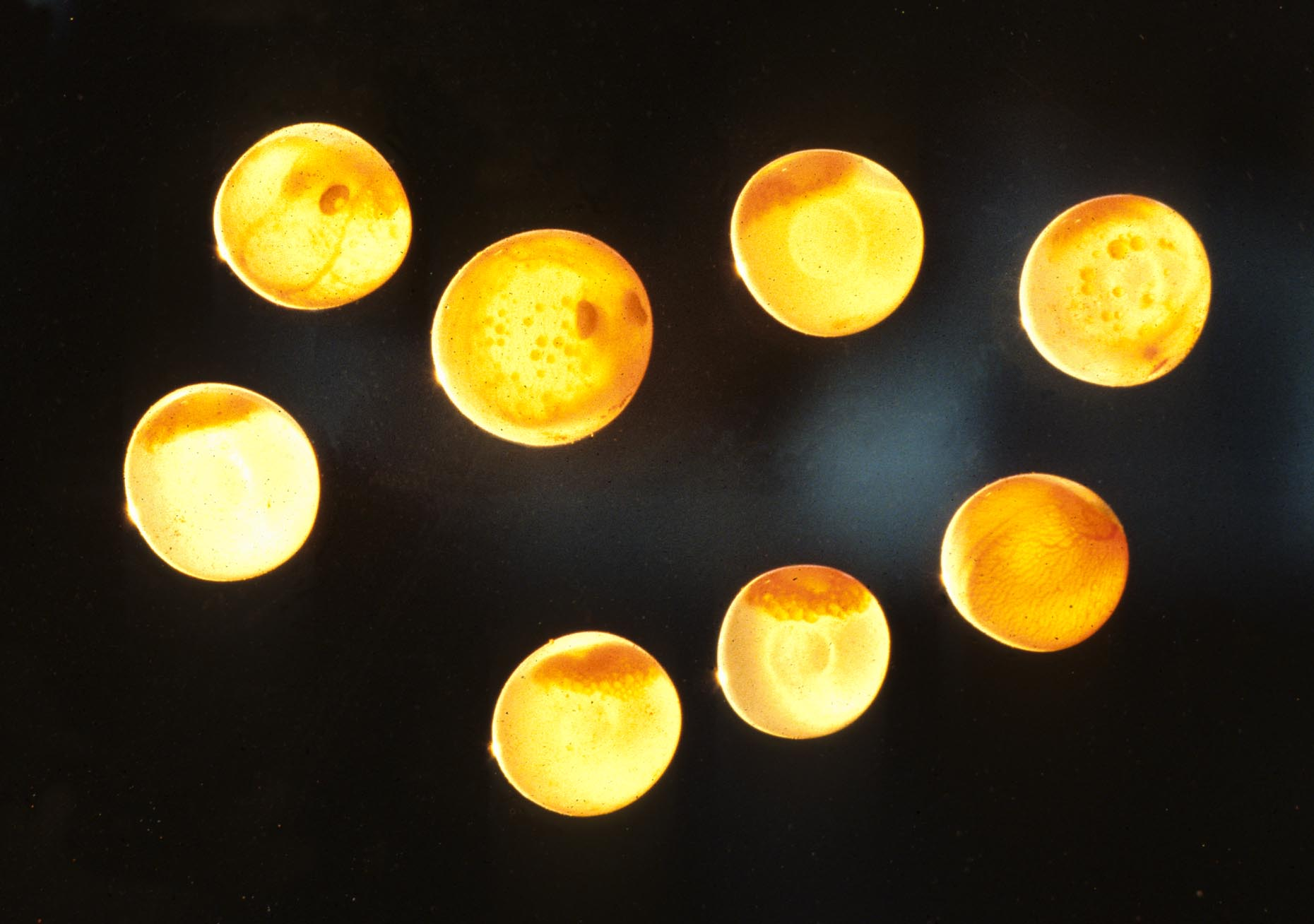
Very young fertilized salmon eggs. Notice the developing eyes and neural tube.

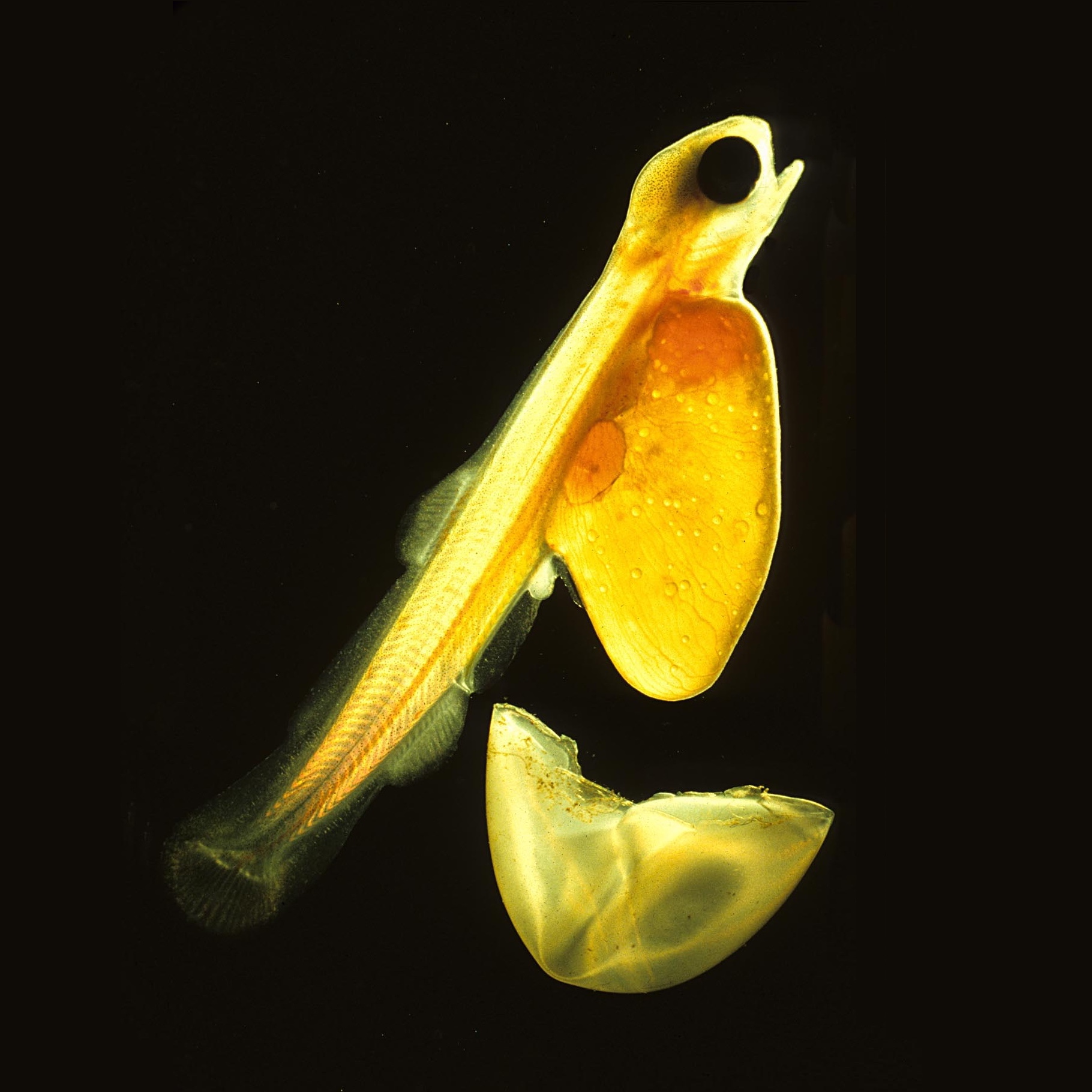
Newly hatched alevin feed on their yolk sacs.

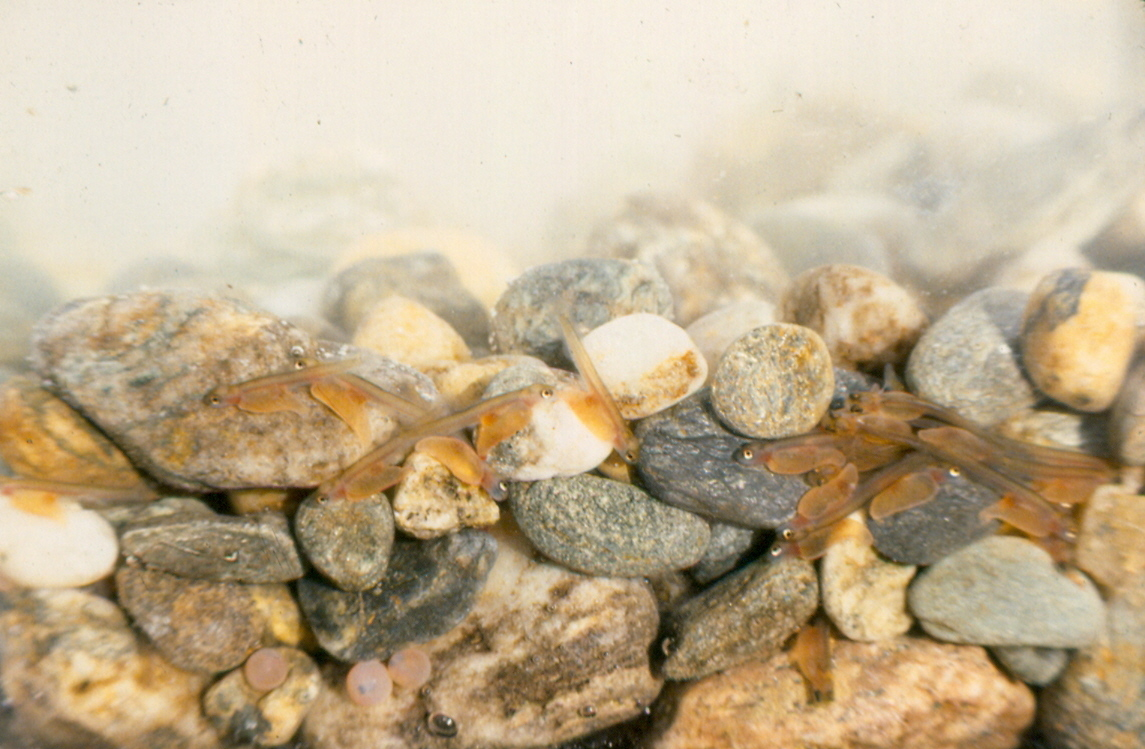
When the alevin or sac fry have depleted their yolk sac or "lunch box", they emerge from the gravel habitat of their redd (nest) to look for food as fry.

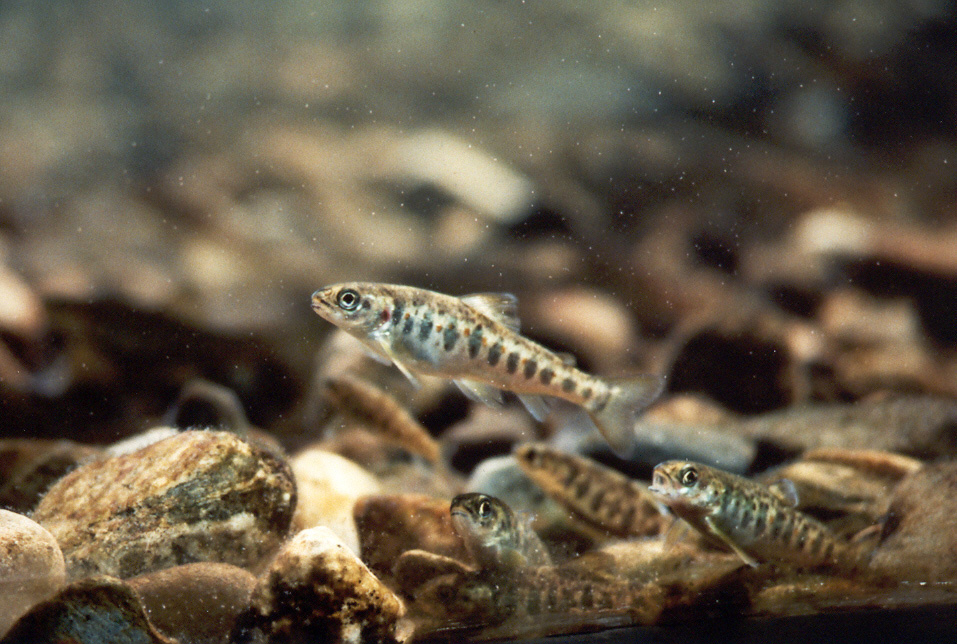
The fry become parr, and pick home rocks or plants in the streambed from which they dart out to capture insect larvae and other passing food.

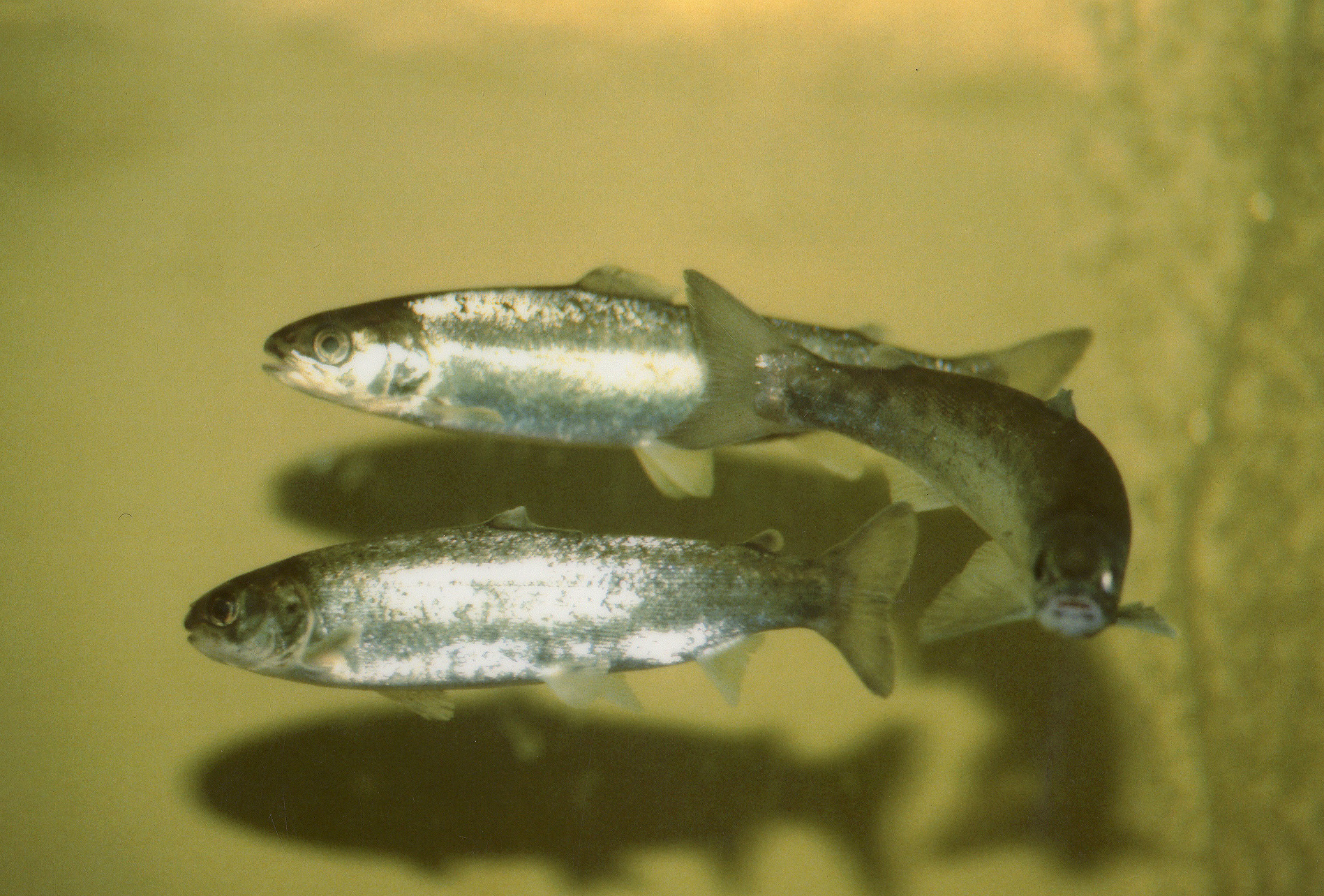
When the parr are ready for migration to the ocean, they become smolt.

=== Breeding ===
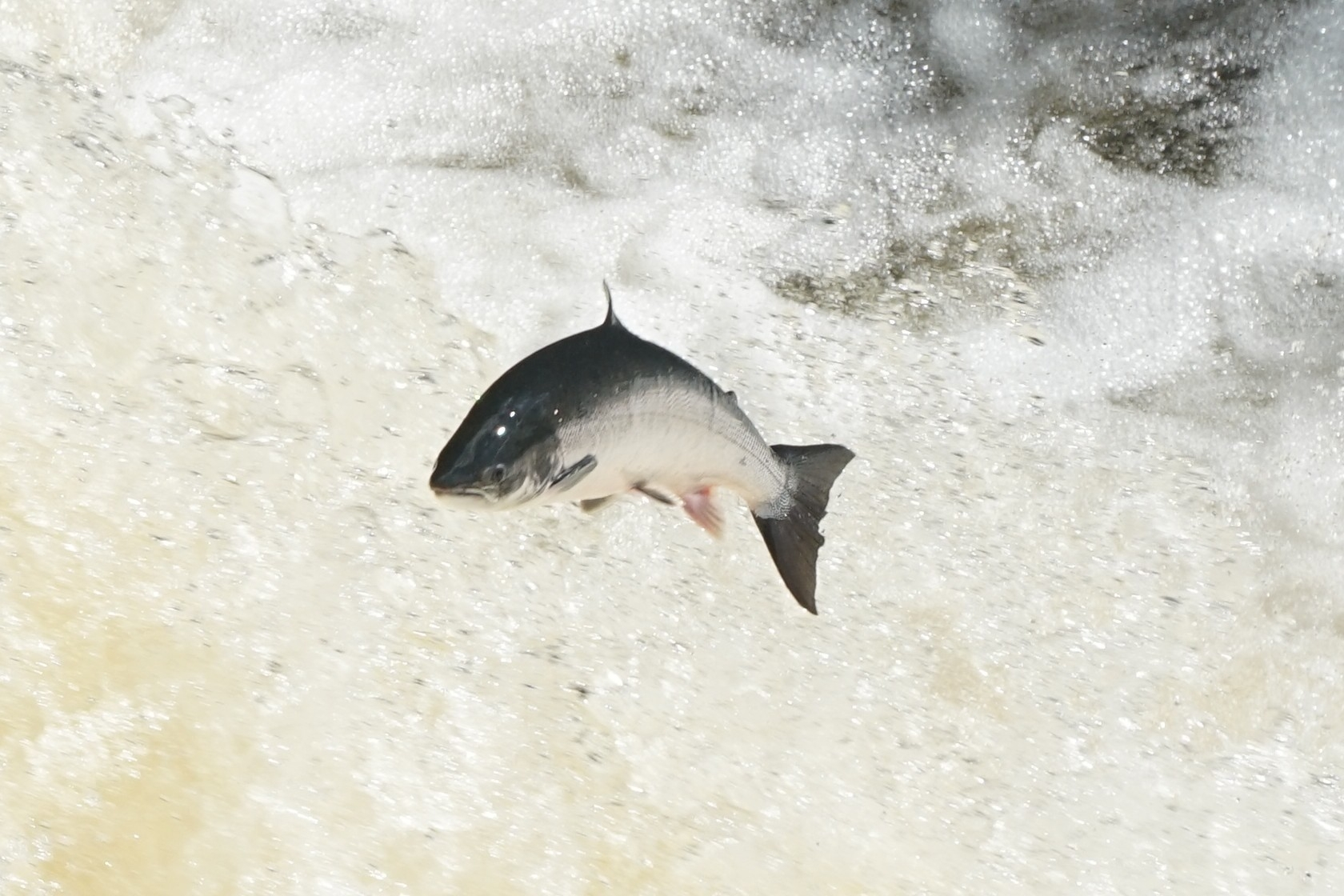
Jumping at the Falls of Shin, Scotland

Atlantic salmon breed in the rivers of Western Europe from northern Portugal north to Norway, Iceland, and Greenland, and the east coast of North America from Connecticut in the United States north to northern Labrador and Arctic Canada.

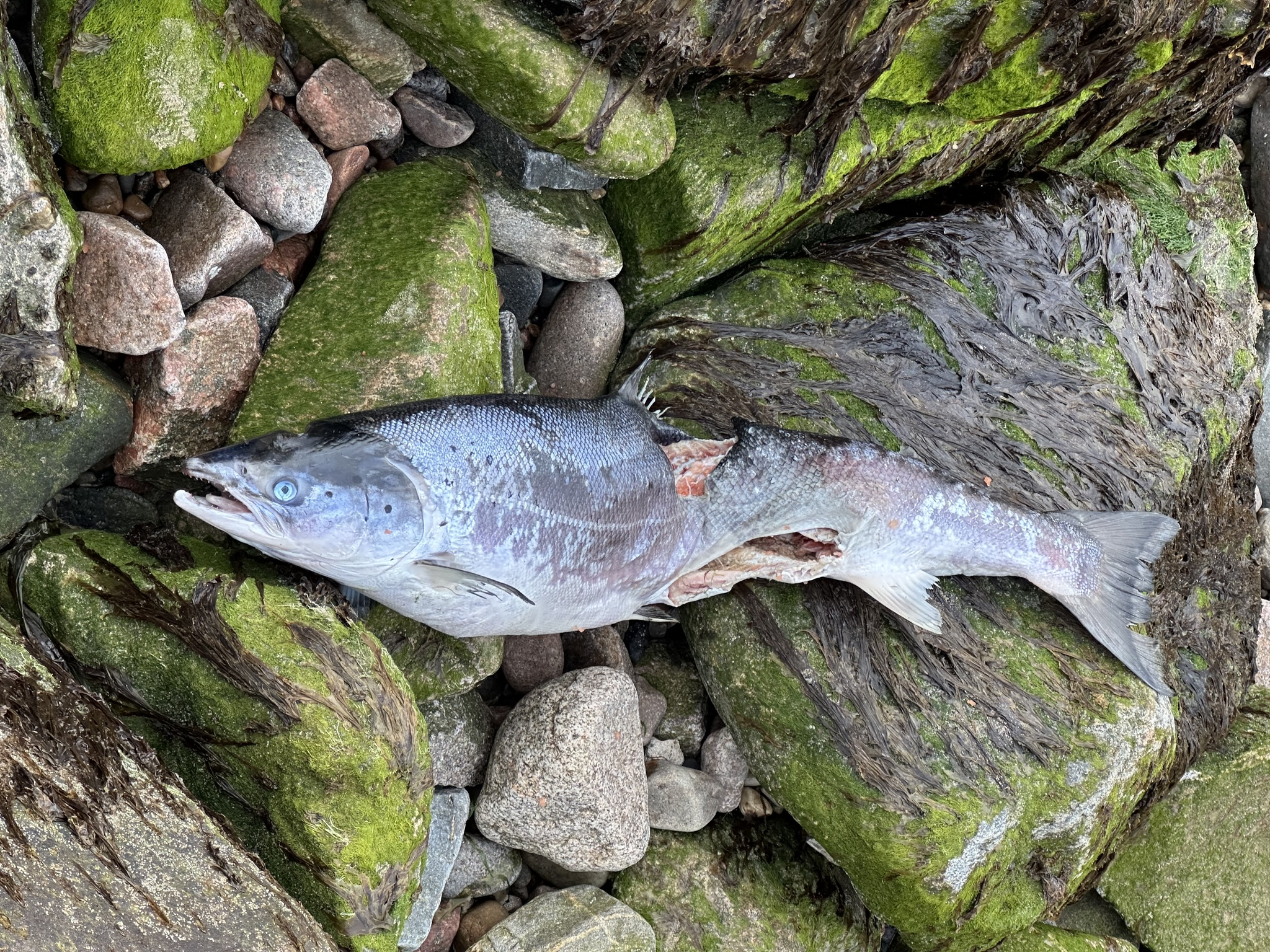
Carcass half-eaten by animals, in Scotland.

The species constructs a nest or "redd" in the gravel bed of a stream. The female creates a powerful downdraught of water with her tail near the gravel to excavate a depression. After she and a male fish have eggs and milt (sperm), respectively, upstream of the depression, the female again uses her tail, this time to shift gravel to cover the eggs and milt which have lodged in the depression.

Unlike the various Pacific salmon species which die after spawning (semelparous), the Atlantic salmon is iteroparous, which means the fish may recondition themselves and return to the sea to repeat the migration and spawning pattern several times, although most spawn only once or twice. Migration and spawning exact an enormous physiological toll on individuals, such that repeat spawners are the exception rather than the norm. Atlantic salmon show high diversity in age of maturity and may mature as parr, one- to five-sea-winter fish, and in rare instances, at older sea ages. This variety of ages can occur in the same population, constituting a 'bet hedging' strategy against variation in stream flows. So in a drought year, some fish of a given age will not return to spawn, allowing that generation other, wetter years in which to spawn.

==== Hybridization ====
When in shared breeding habitats, Atlantic salmon will hybridize with brown trout (Salmo trutta). Hybrids between Atlantic salmon and brown trout were detected in two of four watersheds studied in northern Spain. The proportions of hybrids in samples of salmon ranged from 0 to 7-7% but these proportions were not significantly homogeneous among locations, resulting in a mean hybridization rate of 2-3%. This is the highest rate of natural hybridization so far reported and is significantly greater than rates observed elsewhere in Europe.

=== Beaver impact ===
The decline in anadromous salmonid species over the last two to three centuries is correlated with the decline in the North American beaver and European beaver, although some fish and game departments continue to advocate removal of beaver dams as potential barriers to spawning runs. Migration of adult Atlantic salmon may be limited by beaver dams during periods of low stream flows, but the presence of juvenile salmon upstream of the dams suggests they are penetrated by parr. Downstream migration of Atlantic salmon smolts was similarly unaffected by beaver dams, even in periods of low flows.

In a 2003 study, Atlantic salmon and sea-run brown trout spawning in the Numedalslågen River and 51 of its tributaries in southeastern Norway was unhindered by beavers. In a restored, third-order stream in northern Nova Scotia, beaver dams generally posed no barrier to Atlantic salmon migration except in the smallest upstream reaches in years of low flow where pools were not deep enough to enable the fish to leap the dam or without a column of water over-topping the dam for the fish to swim up.

The importance of winter habitat to salmonids afforded by beaver ponds may be especially important in streams of northerly latitudes without deep pools where ice cover makes contact with the bottom of shallow streams. In addition, the up to eight-year-long residence time of juveniles in freshwater may make beaver-created permanent summer pools a crucial success factor for Atlantic salmon populations. In fact, two-year-old Atlantic salmon parr in beaver ponds in eastern Canada showed faster summer growth in length and mass and were in better condition than parr upstream or downstream from the pond.

== Relationship to humans ==
Atlantic salmon is a popular fish for human consumption and is commonly sold fresh, canned, or frozen.

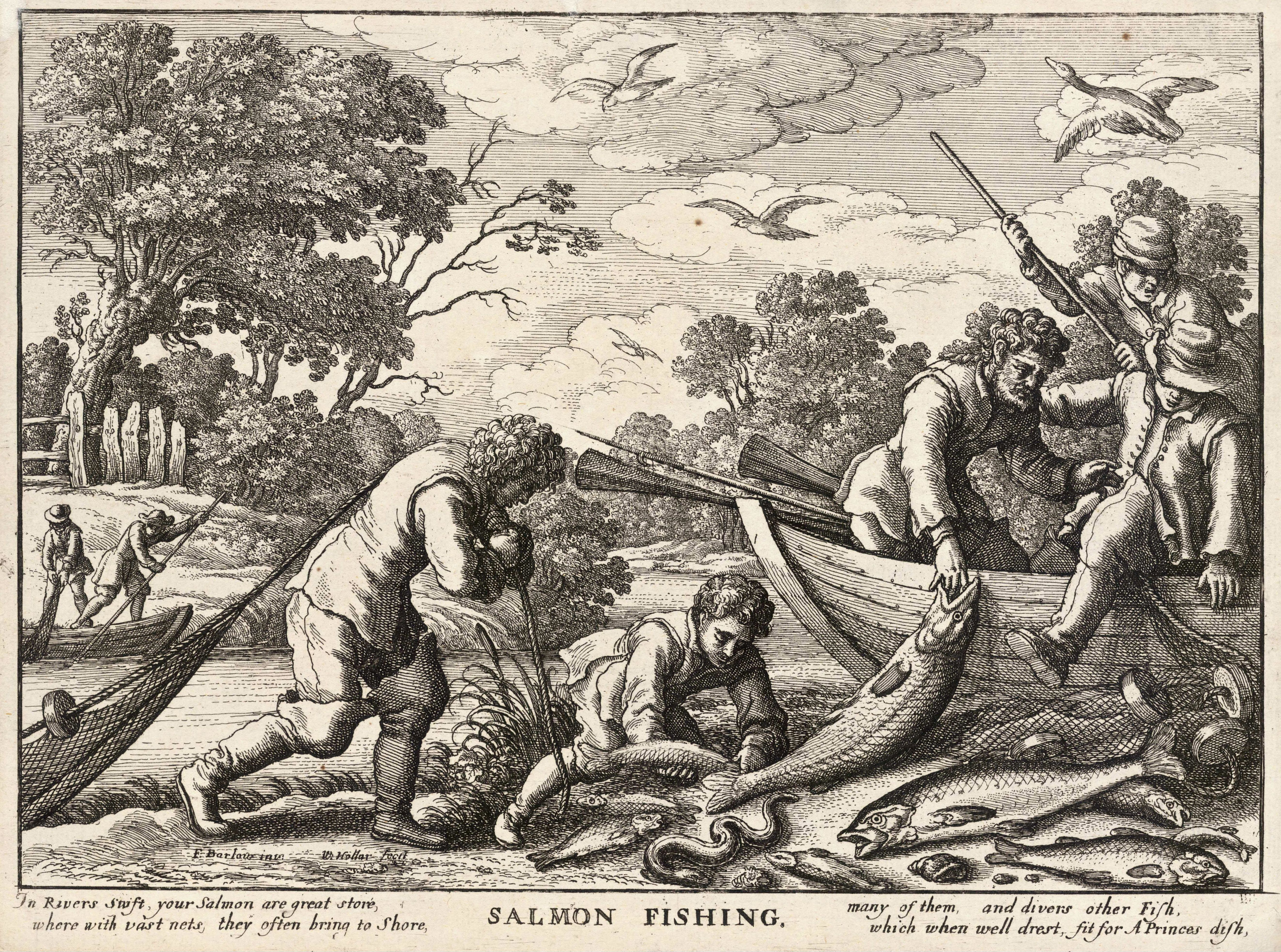
Seine fishing for salmon – Wenzel Hollar, 1607–1677

Wood and stone weirs along streams and ponds were used for millennia to harvest salmon in the rivers of New England. European fishermen gillnetted for Atlantic salmon in rivers using hand-made nets for many centuries and gillnetting was also used in early colonial America.

In its natal streams, Atlantic salmon are considered prized recreational fish, pursued by fly anglers during its annual runs. At one time, the species supported an important commercial fishery, but having become endangered throughout its range globally, wild-caught Atlantic salmon are now virtually absent from the market. Instead, nearly all are from aquaculture farms, predominantly in Norway, Chile, Canada, the UK, Ireland, Faroe Islands, Russia and Tasmania in Australia.

=== Aquaculture ===
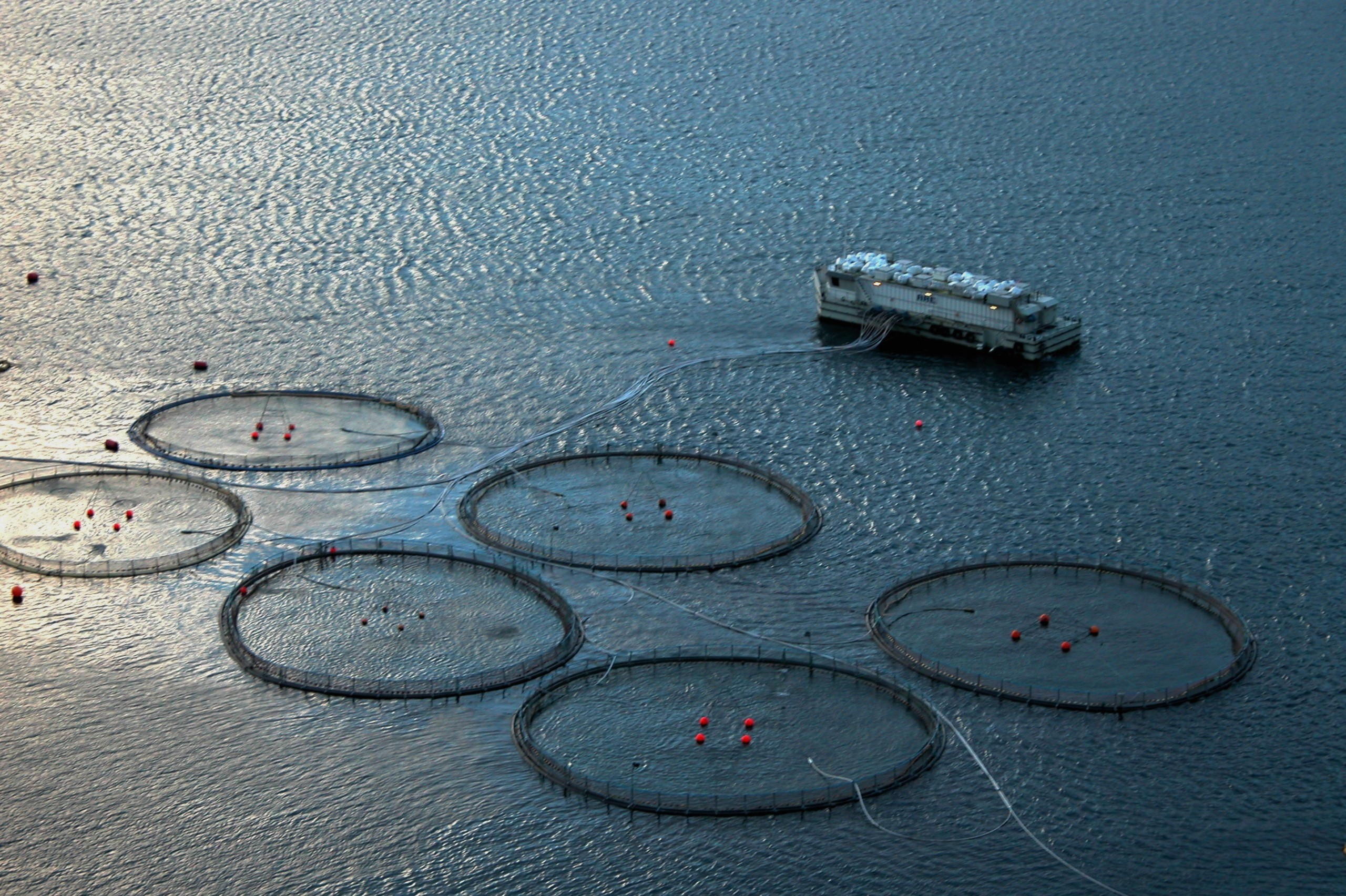
Atlantic salmon marine cages in the Faroe Islands

Capture (blue) and aquaculture (green) production of Atlantic salmon (Salmo salar) in million tonnes from 1975 to 2022, as reported by the FAO

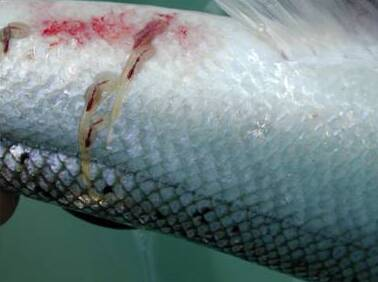
Sea lice on farmed Atlantic salmon

Adult male and female fish are anaesthetised; their eggs and sperm are "stripped" after the fish are cleaned and cloth dried. Sperm and eggs are mixed, washed, and placed into freshwater. Adults recover in flowing, clean, well-aerated water. Some researchers have even studied cryopreservation of their eggs.

Fry are generally reared in large freshwater tanks for 12 to 20 months. Once the fish have reached the smolt phase, they are taken out to sea, where they are held for up to two years. During this time, the fish grow and mature in large cages off the coasts of Canada, the US, or parts of Europe.

There are many different commercially available cage designs built to operate in a wide variety of aquatic conditions. High-density polyethylene (HDPE) cages are widely used, with HDPE pipes forming a floating collar ring onto which the fish net pen is secured and suspended in the water below.

Advancements in cage technologies have allowed for reduction in fish escapes, improvement in growing conditions, and maximization of aquaculture production volume per unit area of growing space.

==== Controversy ====
Farmed Atlantic salmon are known to occasionally escape from cages and enter the habitat of wild populations. Interbreeding between escaped farm fish and wild fish decreases genetic diversity and introduces "the potential to genetically alter native populations, reduce local adaptation and negatively affect population viability and character". A study in 2000 demonstrated that the genes of farmed Atlantic salmon intrude wild populations mainly through wild males breeding with farmed females, though farmed specimens showed reduced capacity for breeding success overall compared to their wild counterparts. Further study in 2018 discovered extensive cross-breeding of wild and farmed Atlantic salmon in the Northwest Atlantic, showing that 27.1% of fish in 17 out of 18 rivers examined are artificially stocked or hybrids. Farming of Atlantic salmon in open cages at sea has also been linked, at least in part, to a decline in wild stocks attributed to the passing of parasites from farmed to wild individuals.

On the west coast of the United States and Canada, aquaculturists are generally under scrutiny to ensure that non-native Atlantic salmon cannot escape from their open-net pens, however occasional incidents of escape have been documented. During one incident in 2017, for example, up to 300,000 potentially invasive Atlantic salmon escaped a farm among the San Juan Islands in Puget Sound, Washington. Washington went on in 2019 to implement a gradual phase out of salmon farming to be completed by 2025.

Despite being the source of considerable controversy, the likelihood of escaped Atlantic salmon establishing an invasive presence in the Pacific Northwest is considered minimal, largely because a number of 20th century efforts aimed at deliberately introducing them to the region were ultimately unsuccessful. From 1905 until 1935, for example, in excess of 8.6 million Atlantic salmon of various life stages (predominantly advanced fry) were intentionally introduced to more than 60 individual British Columbia lakes and streams. Historical records indicate, in a few instances, mature sea-run Atlantic salmon were captured in the Cowichan River; however, a self-sustaining population never materialized. Similarly unsuccessful results were realized after deliberate attempts at introduction by Washington as late as the 1980s. Consequently, environmental assessments by the US National Marine Fisheries Service (NMFS), the Washington Department of Fish and Wildlife and the BC Environmental Assessment Office have concluded the potential risk of Atlantic salmon colonization in the Pacific Northwest is low.

==== Future prospects ====
A study of Næve et al. (2022) estimated the impact of 50 years of genetic selection and tried to predict the impact it could have until 2050. In order to do this, a common garden experiment was used to model and simulate past and future effects for 11 generations of genetic selection of increased growth rate in Atlantic salmon. To model the contribution that breeding has made in the industry from generation 0 (harvested in 1975– 1978) to generation 11 (harvested in 2017 – 2019), and to simulate growth until 2050 (generation 24), the Norwegian salmon aquaculture production between 2016 and 2019 was used as a base case. The simulation of the expected growth until 2050 (generation 24) gave five different scenarios : Historical (H1), Forecast 1 (F1), Forecast 2 (F2), Forecast 3 (F3) and Forecast 4 (F4). Changes in thermal growth coefficient (TGC) per generation were used in the model to simulate the differences in the five scenarios. The genetic data, H1, and the most conservative forecast scenario, F1, simulate what can be expected in 2050 if the trend from generation 0 through 11 is maintained. The following forecast scenarios assume a greater increase in genetic growth with a larger increase in the TGC in the generations to come. In the next two generations, more advanced selection methods such as marker assisted selection (from generation 10) and genomic selection (from generation 11) were implemented. This resulted in increased gain in selection for growth and simulated F2 and F3. The most progressive scenario, F4, aimed at exploring the effect in the industry when the full genetic potential is utilized. This assumes a further development of advanced techniques in the years to come. The authors of the article found that the daily yield of the biomass increased with increasing generations in the historic and forecast scenarios. Further, the production time in seawater to reach the harvest weight of 5100 g is expected to be reduced by 53% in 2050. When production time can be reduced, this will also reduce e.g. time at risk of diseases. In the most progressive scenario, mortality in seawater was expected to be reduced by up to 50%. Further, the authors found that production per license can increase by up to 121%. Additionally, 77% of the new volume needed to achieve five million tonnes in 2050, may be provided by genomic selection. However, one should keep in mind that this article was published by the firm Aquagen, and can possibly be biased and too optimistic.

== Conservation ==
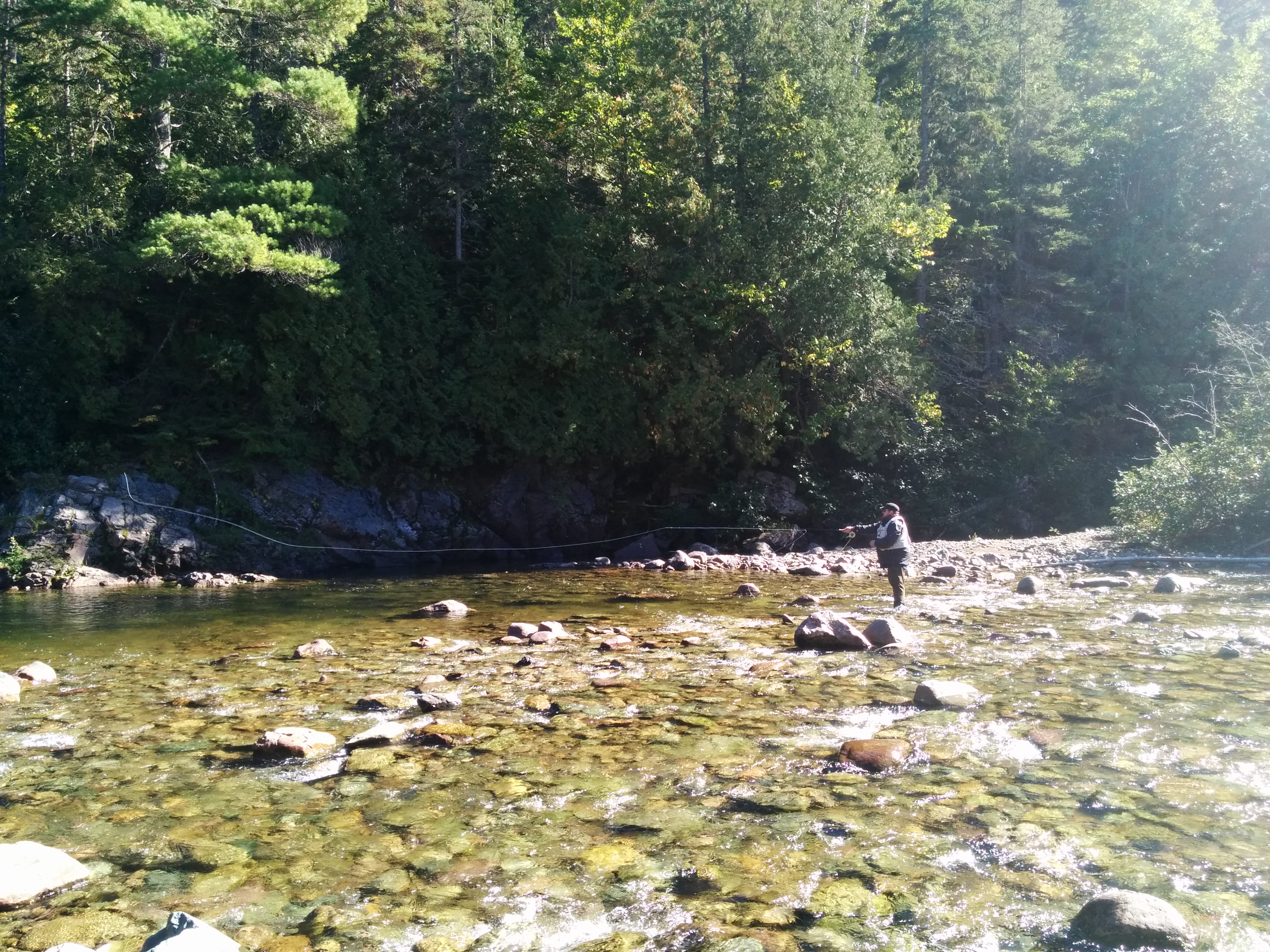
A man fishing for Atlantic salmon in the Pabos River of Quebec as recreation.

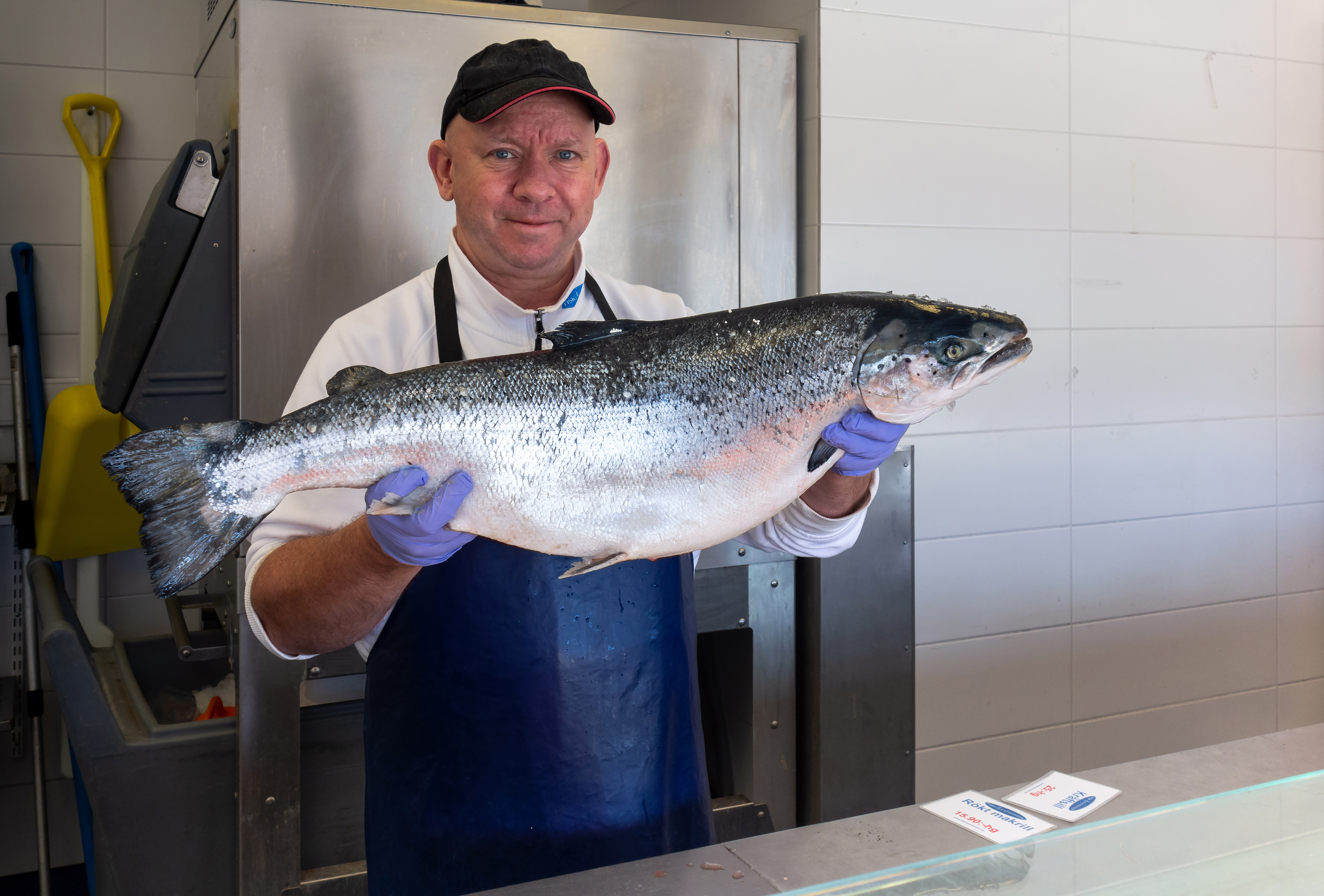
A fishmonger in Lysekil, Sweden shows a Norwegian salmon.

The IUCN rates Salmo salar with a conservation status of "near threatened". A recent regional assessment revealed that the European population of this species is vulnerable, with a similar status globally. Location-specific assessments have shown population declines across parts of the Atlantic Salmon's natural range, with populations along the coast of Maine and the Inner Bay of Fundy now listed as "endangered" under the Endangered Species Act, and the Canadian Species at Risk Act, respectively.

Human activities have impacted salmon populations across parts of its range. The major threats are from overfishing and habitat change. Salmon decline in Lake Ontario goes back to the 18th–19th centuries, due to logging and soil erosion, as well as dam and mill construction. By 1896, the species was declared extirpated from the lake.

In the 1950s, salmon from rivers in the United States and Canada, as well as from Europe, were discovered to gather in the sea around Greenland and the Faroe Islands. A commercial fishing industry was established, taking salmon using drift nets. After an initial series of record annual catches, the numbers crashed; between 1979 and 1990, catches fell from four million to 700,000.

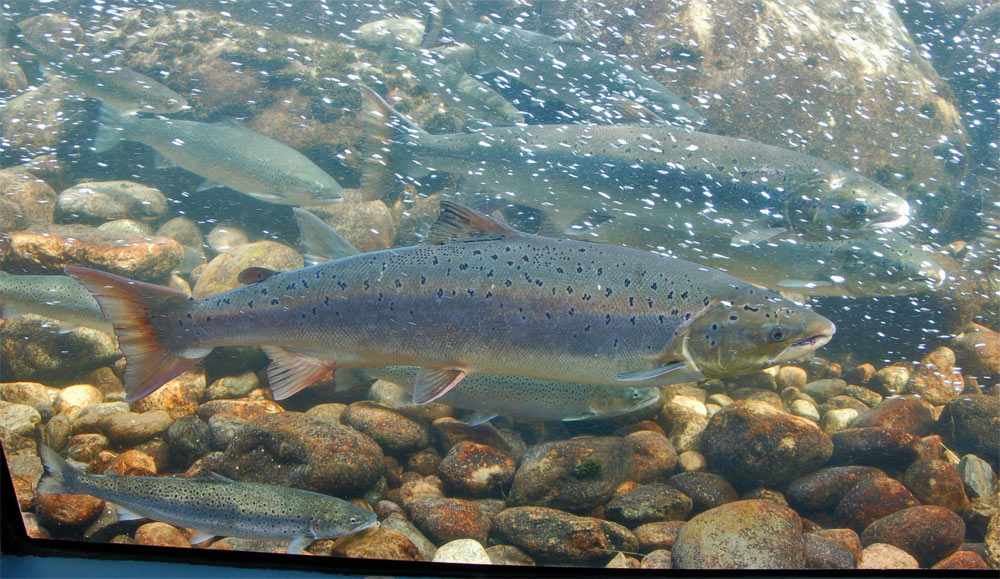
In captivity

Beginning around 1990, the rates of Atlantic salmon mortality at sea more than doubled in the western Atlantic. Rivers of the coast of Maine, southern New Brunswick and much of mainland Nova Scotia saw runs drop precipitously, and even disappear. An international effort to study the increased mortality rate was organized by the North Atlantic Salmon Conservation Organization. In 2000 the numbers of Atlantic salmon dropped to very low levels in Newfoundland, Canada. In 2007 at least one sport fishing organization from Iceland and Scandinavia blamed less fish caught by recreational anglers on overfishing at sea, and thus created the North Atlantic Salmon Fund to buy commercial quotas in the Atlantic from commercial fishermen in an effort to preserve wild Salmo salar stocks.

Possibly because of improvements in ocean feeding grounds, returns in 2008 were very positive. On the Penobscot River in Maine, returns were about 940 in 2007, and by mid-July 2008, the return was 1,938. Similar stories were reported in rivers from Newfoundland to Quebec. In 2011, more than 3,100 salmon returned to the Penobscot, the most since 1986, and nearly 200 ascended the Narraguagus River, up from the low two digits just a decade before.

Recreational fishing of stocked, landlocked Atlantic salmon is now authorized in much of the US and Canada where it occurs in large numbers, but this is subject to regulations in many states or provinces which are designed to maintain the continuity of the species. Strict catch limits, catch and release practices and forced fly fishing are examples of those regulations. However, catch and release angling can be an additional stressor on Atlantic salmon populations, especially when its impacts are combined with the existing pressures of climate change, overfishing, and predation.

=== Restoration efforts ===
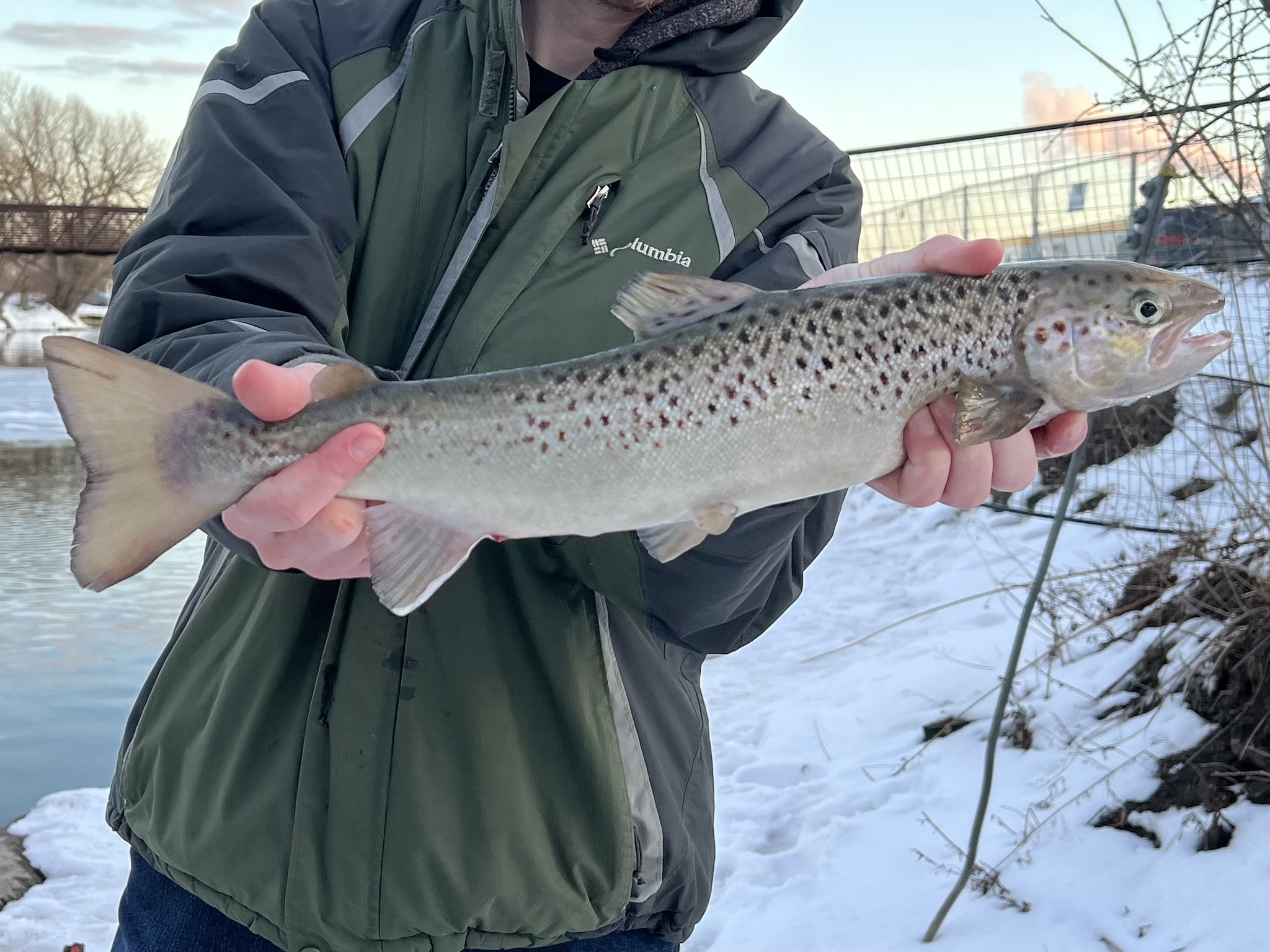
At Lake Ontario

Around the North Atlantic, efforts to restore salmon to their native habitats are underway, with slow progress. Habitat restoration and protection are key to this process, but issues of excessive harvest and competition with farmed and escaped salmon are also primary considerations. In the Great Lakes, Atlantic salmon have been reintroduced, but the percentage of salmon reproducing naturally is very low. Most areas are re-stocked annually. Since the extirpation of Atlantic salmon from Lake Ontario in the late 19th century, the state of New York has stocked its adjoining rivers and tributaries, and in many cases does not allow active fishing.

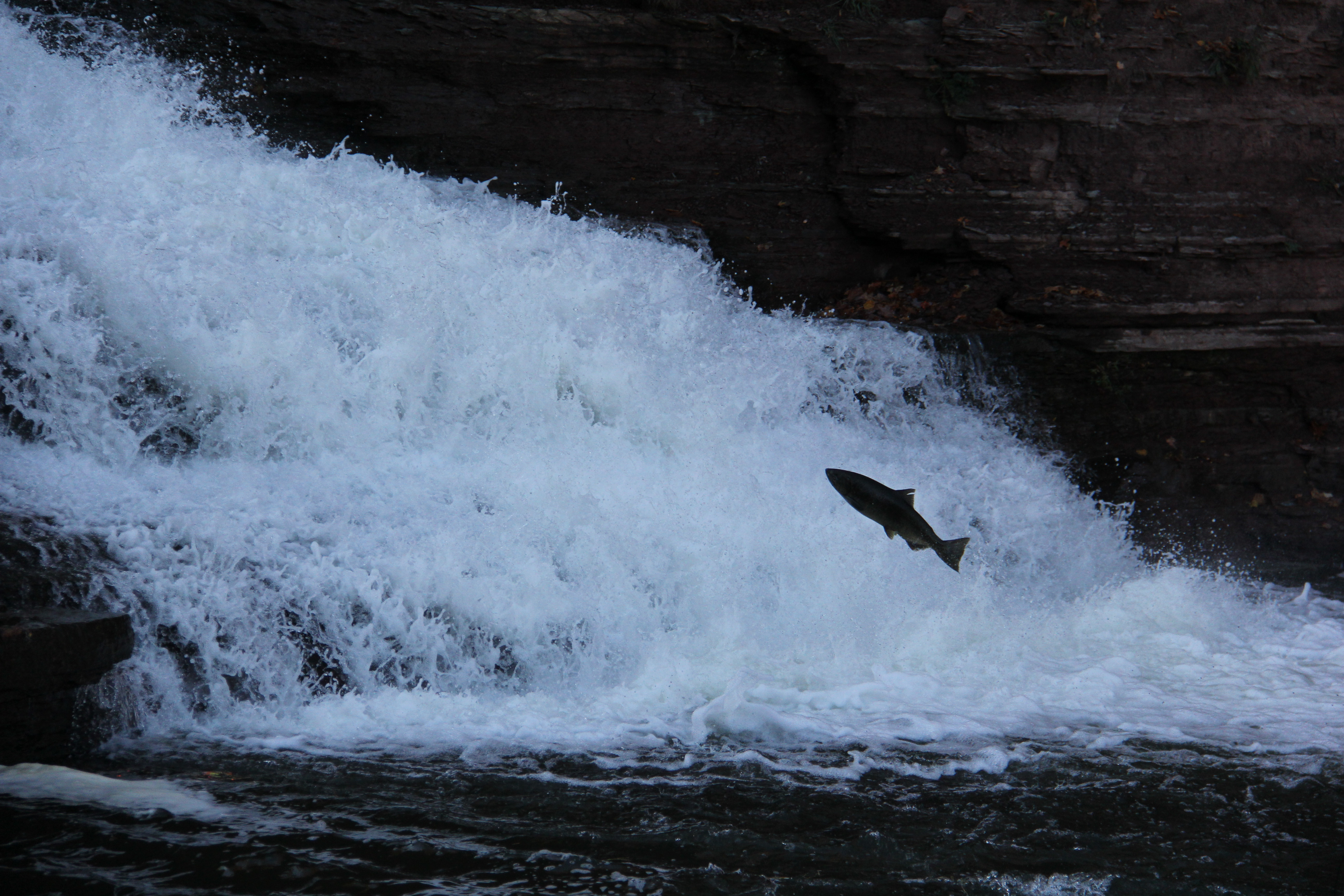
Jumping up a waterfall at Oak Orchard Creek, Lake Ontario

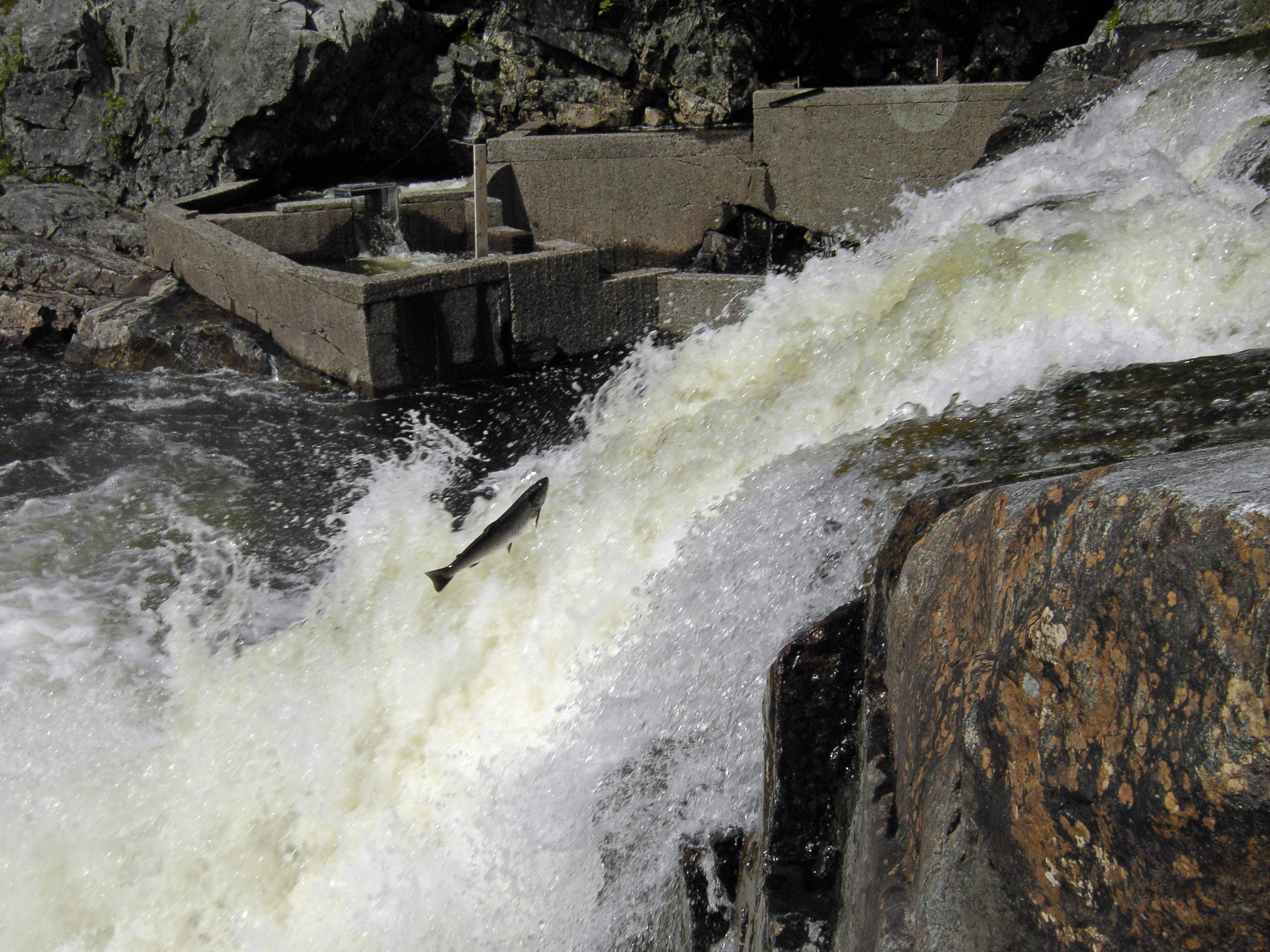
Jumping up a fish ladder in Norway

In the late nineteenth century, the Pennsylvania Fish Commission undertook an ambitious effort to establish Atlantic salmon in the Delaware River. Beginning in 1890, the commission hatched tens of thousands of salmon eggs and released the young fish into cold tributaries of the Upper Delaware watershed. By 1895, fishermen were reportedly catching numerous returning salmon, many weighing between nine and fifteen pounds, which officials believed were the first generation of stocked fish returning from the Atlantic Ocean to spawn. The program was viewed as a significant success at the time and was expected to benefit both recreational angling and the regional economy. The effort followed earlier, largely unsuccessful stocking attempts in the 1870s and reflected a growing belief that fish hatcheries could restore or create valuable fisheries in rivers where salmon were not traditionally abundant. 102460299.pdf

The province of Ontario started the Atlantic Salmon Restoration Program in 2006, which is one of the largest freshwater conservation programs in North America. It has since stocked Lake Ontario and surrounding tributaries with upwards of 6,000,000 young Atlantic salmon, with efforts growing each year. In New England, many efforts are underway to restore salmon to the region by knocking down obsolete dams and updating others with fish ladders and other techniques that have proven effective in the West with Pacific salmon. There is some success thus far, with populations growing in the Penobscot and Connecticut Rivers. Lake Champlain now has Atlantic salmon. The Atlantic Salmon Federation is involved in restoration efforts along the eastern United States and Canada, where their projects are focused on removing barriers to fish passage and eradicating invasive species.

Recent documented successes in the reintroduction of Atlantic salmon include the following:

- In October 2007, salmon were video-recorded running in Toronto's Humber River by the Old Mill.
- A migrating salmon was observed in Ontario's Credit River in November 2007.
- As of 2013, there has been some success in establishing Atlantic salmon in Fish Creek, a tributary of Oneida Lake in central New York.
- In November 2015, salmon nests were observed in Connecticut in the Farmington River, a tributary of the Connecticut River where Atlantic salmon had not been observed spawning since "probably the Revolutionary War". However, both state and federal experts indicated that this find likely represented a dwindling wave of returning stocked fish from massive salmon restoration efforts that had concluded years earlier in 2012. Significant doubt was cast on fish returning to spawn in meaningful numbers after 2017, when the last generation of stocked salmon would return.
- In April 2024, as a result of river restoration it was reported that the Atlantic salmon are once again spawning in the upper waters of the River Derwent in the heart of the United Kingdom for the first time in 100 years.

=== NASCO ===
The North Atlantic Salmon Conservation Organization is an international council made up of Canada, the European Union, Iceland, Norway, the Russian Federation, the United Kingdom, and the United States, with its headquarters in Edinburgh. It was established in 1983 to help protect Atlantic salmon stocks, through the cooperation between nations. They work to restore habitat and promote conservation of the salmon. In December 2021, NASCO published an updated interactive map of their Rivers Database, showing the stock status of wild Atlantic salmon populations across the species range.

== Legislation ==
=== England and Wales ===
Edward I instituted a penalty for collecting salmon during certain times of the year. His son Edward II continued, regulating the construction of weirs. Enforcement was overseen by those appointed by the justices of the peace. Because of confusing laws and the appointed conservators having little power, most laws were barely enforced.

Based on this, a royal commission was appointed in 1860 to thoroughly investigate the Atlantic salmon and the laws governing the species, resulting in the 1861 Salmon Fisheries Act. The act placed enforcement of the laws under the Home Office's control, but it was later transferred to the Board of Trade, and then later to the Board of Agriculture and Fisheries. Another act passed in 1865 imposed charges to fish and catch limits. It also caused the formation of local boards having jurisdiction over a certain river. The next significant act, passed in 1907, allowed the board to charge 'duties' to catch other freshwater fish, including trout.

Despite legislation, board effects decreased until, in 1948, the River Boards Act gave authority of all freshwater fish and the prevention of pollution to one board per river. In total, it created 32 boards. In 1974, the 32 boards, which by then were integrated into regional river authorities, were reduced to 10 regional water authorities (RWAs). Although only the Northumbrian Water Authority, Welsh National Water Development Authority, Northwest Water Authority and Southwest Water Authority had significant salmon populations, all ten also regulated and conserved trout and freshwater eel fisheries

The Salmon and Freshwater Fisheries Act was passed in 1975. Among other things, it regulated fishing licenses, seasons, and size limits, and banned obstructing the salmon's migratory paths.

=== Scotland ===
Salmon was greatly valued in medieval Scotland, and various fishing methods, including the use of weirs, cruives, and nets, were used to catch the fish. Fishing for salmon was heavily regulated in order to conserve the resource. In 1318, King Robert I enacted legislation setting a minimum size for cruives, "so that no fry of fish are impeded from ascending and descending..." Laws on catching fish upon royal lands were frequently updated, demonstrating their importance. Because the fish were held in such high regard, poachers were severely punished; a person twice convicted of poaching salmon on a royal estate could be sentenced to death. The export of salmon was economically important in Aberdeen; beginning in the 15th century, the fish could be preserved through salting and barreling, allowing them to be exported abroad, including as far away as the Baltic. The volume of the early Scottish salmon trade is impossible to determine, since surviving custom records date only from the 1420 onward, and since Aberdeen burgesses enjoyed an exemption on salmon customs until the 1530s.

During the 15th century, many laws were passed; many regulated fishing times, and worked to ensure smolts could safely pass downstream. James III even closed a meal mill because of its history of killing fish attracted to the wheel.

More recent legislation has established commissioners who manage districts. Furthermore, the Salmon and Freshwater Fisheries Act in 1951 required the Secretary of State be given data about the catches of salmon and trout to help establish catch limits.

=== United States ===
Commercial and recreational fishing of wild, anadromous Atlantic salmon is prohibited in the United States. Several populations of Atlantic salmon are in serious decline, and are listed as endangered under the Endangered Species Act (ESA). Currently, runs of 11 rivers in Maine are on the list – Kennebec, Androscoggin, Penobscot, Sheepscot, Ducktrap, Cove Brook, Pleasant, Narraguagus, Machias, East Machias and Dennys. The Penobscot River is the "anchor river" for Atlantic salmon populations in the US. Returning fish in 2008 were around 2,000, more than double the 2007 return of 940.

Section 9 of the ESA makes it illegal to take an endangered species of fish or wildlife. The definition of "take" is to "harass, harm, pursue, hunt, shoot, wound, kill, trap, capture, or collect, or to attempt to engage in any such conduct".

=== Canada ===
The federal government has prime responsibility for protecting the Atlantic salmon, but over the last generation, effort has continued to shift management as much as possible to provincial authorities through memoranda of understanding, for example. A new Atlantic salmon policy is in the works, and in the past three years, the government has attempted to pass a new version of the century-old Fisheries Act through Parliament.

Federal legislation regarding at-risk populations is weak. Inner Bay of Fundy Atlantic salmon runs were declared endangered in 2000. A recovery and action plan is in place.

Nongovernmental organizations, such as the Atlantic Salmon Federation, constantly demand for improvements in management, and for initiatives to be considered. For example, the ASF and the Nova Scotia Salmon Association desire the use of technology for mitigation of acid rain-affected rivers such as used in Norway is in 54 Nova Scotia rivers and managed to raise the funds to get a project in place in one river.

In Quebec, the daily catch limit for Atlantic salmon is dependent on the individual river. Some rivers are strictly catch and release with a limit of 3 released fish. Each catch must be declared. Some rivers allow you to keep between 1 or 2 grilse (30 cm to 63 cm), while some of the more prolific rivers (mainly on the north coast) will allow you to keep 1 salmon over 63 cm. The annual catch limit is 4 Atlantic salmon of small size and only 1 of those may be bigger than 63 cm.

In Lake Ontario, the historic populations of Atlantic salmon became extinct, and cross-national efforts have been under way to reintroduce the species, with some areas already having restocked naturally reproducing populations.

== See also ==
- AquAdvantage salmon, a genetically modified Atlantic salmon
- Atlantic Salmon Federation
- Salmon as food
