= British Columbia Archaeological Impact Assessment =

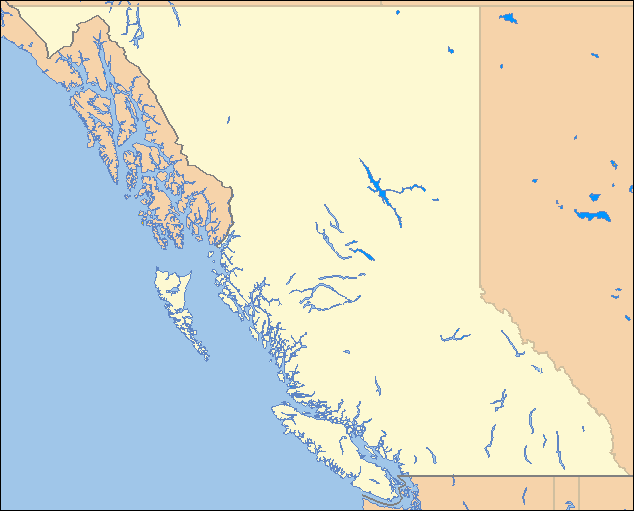
British Columbia, Canada

British Columbia Archaeological Assessment Process: British Columbia has set forth a directive process in order to regulate the development of land by private and government identities in accordance with the Heritage Conservation Act. Archaeological sites in British Columbia include famous aboriginal archaeological sites such as Yuquot, Charlie Lake Cave, SG̱ang Gwaay [Ninstints], and Kwäday Dän Ts'ìnchi, an archaeological site containing a frozen person in British Columbia's Tatshenshini-Alsek Park. In British Columbia, archaeological site and heritage protection follow both the Heritage Conservation Act and the federal Environmental Assessment Act, which can influence development projects including provincial government infrastructure. This process has not been put into place to discourage development, but has been put into place to regulate historic cultural sites in order to retain historic areas, sites, ecofacts, and artefacts.

== Procedures ==
When proposing ground altering developments on non-federal lands in British Columbia, there are established procedures to ensure archaeological sites are not inadvertently damaged. The process is managed by the British Columbia Archaeology Branch and involves several steps that is often the responsibility of a proponent of a development. According to the Environmental Assessment Act, the following stages will occur:

Process	From	To
Initial Screening and to determine branch responsibility	The Manager and Permitting/Assessment Section	Project Officer
Review of Application; including maps, reports, and/or archaeological inventory	Project Officer	No Exchange
In the case that archaeological sites would not be impacted, the file would exchange hands away from the archaeological assessment department of British Columbia	Project Officer	Project Assessment Director (EAO)
When archaeological impact is plausible, the project committee would be produced for a review of the said application	Project Officer	Project Committee
After the detailed project review, the project committee can take one of three steps 1) Certify the project 2) Not certify the project 3) refer the project to the Environmental Assessment Board for a public hearing	Project committee	Appropriate ministers
Where a public hearing is directed and unresolved archaeological resource management issues remain, the Project Officer will address these in the terms of reference for the hearing	Project Officer	Hearing

When in receipt of a development referral, the following procedure will be undertaken by the British Columbia Archaeology Branch, in accordance with the Heritage Conservation Act and the Environmental Assessment Act:

Process	From	To
Assignment of application for referral to be reviewed	Manager and Archaeological Permitting/Assessment Section	A project Officer
In the process of reviewing the application, the project officer may utilize provincial archaeological inventory, maps, air photos, and/or reports	Project Officer	No exchange
Project Officer responds to the referral within the time specified	Project Officer	No exchange
If the proposed project is likely to damage archaeological resources in accordance with the Conservation Act, the project officer will advise for an archaeological impact assessment to take place before starting the development	Project Officer	Referral agency is advised, but no exchange occurs.
In limited risk cases, the project advisor details a process that should be undertaken if archaeological remains or sites are encountered by the development crew	Project Officer	Referral Agency/Proponent is advised of procedure, no exchange occurs.
Where damage is unlikely, the referral department/proponent are notified that development can proceed as proposed	Archaeological Assessment Officer	Referral Agency/Proponent

== Heritage Conservation Act ==
The British Columbia Heritage Conservation Act has been put into place in order to protect provincial heritage sites, objects, and other heritage property that hold collective importance to the history and culture of British Columbia, for both aboriginal and non-aboriginal peoples. First Nations of British Columbia have the ability to make an agreement with the Provincial Government under this act to protect what they may classify as a cultural or heritage site, these applications by First Nations must be approved by the Minister. If another provincial act conflicts with the interests of this act in regards to heritage sites within British Columbia the Heritage Conservation Act will prevail. With the consent of the Lieutenant Governor in Council the minister may establish and distinguish heritage classifications and policies in accordance with heritage sites and object(s) managed by the government. The Heritage Conservation Act of British Columbia can delegate essentially what qualifies as historical and can claim any unclaimed historical and/or cultural property and call it as its own. The result of the object or site, can end up in a museum or as a preserved site by the Provincial Government of British Columbia. Essentially this act would provide certainty to the preservation of archaeological heritage sites along with the excavated artifacts recovered during a development or an archaeological excavation.

== Environmental Assessment Act ==
The Environmental Assessment Act is enforced by the provincial government of British Columbia and by the British Columbia Environmental Assessment Office. Under this act, the proposed development is not to occur or progress until an environmental certificate is authorized by the Environmental Assessment Office, when classified as a "reviewable project". If a project is designated to occur on treaty land, even with the authority of the Environmental Assessment Office no development is to occur until consent is given by the treaty First Nations band, and if authorization is not granted, the project will be stopped from operating on said treaty land. When determining a need for an environmental assessment certificate, the executive director may determine that the project may proceed without an assessment certificate, in the conditions that no adverse environmental, social, or cultural damage would occur.

The executive director can also call for the need of an environmental assessment if there would be adverse effects on cultural, social, or other significant environmental factors. The executive director essentially has a lot of control under the determination of environmental assessments, including determining the hazard ratio of reviewable projects. The executive director also would advise the proponent of their decision and for required documentation before a final decision.

All environmental assessment agreements with the federal or other provincial governments will be made through the provincial minister of British Columbia and can be approved or denied by the minister. With written notice by the minister, any individual holding consent of the minister may enter a reviewable site and inspect it as guided by the sanctions of the provincial Environmental Assessment Act.

If a proponent begins with the operation of their project, the Environmental Assessment Act along with the Environmental Assessment Office has the authority to dismantle, modify, or cease the continuance of this project, as set forth by the laws included with this assessment act. If a said project goes forward without the consent of the Environmental Assessment Office, the minister may apply to the Supreme court to enforce the decision of the Environmental Assessment Office in accordance with the Environmental Assessment Act. If the proponent does not cease their acts that are not in compliance with rule 41, they may be liable to pay $100,000 on their first offence, $200,000 on their subsequent offences if a corporation, $100,000 (plus 6 months of jail time)/$200,000 (plus 12 months of jail time) for subsequent offences for individuals.

== Kwäday Dän Ts'ìnchi Project ==
The Kwäday Dän Ts'ìnchi or in translation "long ago person found" is an archaeological excavation that has occurred in the Tatshenshini-Alsek Park, which is part of the Champagne and Aishihik First Nations (CAFN), this person was found by hunters in 1999. This project holds a significant tie to the British Columbia Archaeological Assessment office due to their involvement in organizing the excavation team and their involvement in assuring the proper recovery of this body. The body that was recovered by archaeologists was radiocarbon dated back roughly 550 years ago, predating the voyage of Christopher Columbus to the New World, and dating to approximately 300 years before the arrival of Europeans on the Northwest Coast. The Kwäday Dän Ts'ìnchi was found with his possession, which included a robe made of 95 animals skins, a spear thrower, an iron-blade knife, a sinew, along with a walking stick. With cooperation of the First Nations community of this area and a team of forensic anthropologists, the Kwäday Dän Ts'ìnchi was said to have died on a glacier, which quickly incorporated and preserved his body, where he would lie for hundreds of years, until several hunters would discover his remains. This lost hunter would become the study of museums, experts, and locals for decades to come, the assessment process for this archaeological excavation was also very analytic and detailed, due to this individual being the oldest person found in North American history.
