= Ministry of Environment and Parks (British Columbia) =

Ministry overview
- Formed: 2017; 9 years ago
- Type: Ministry responsible for coordinating environmental policies and programs
- Jurisdiction: British Columbia
- Headquarters: 525 Superior Street Victoria, British Columbia V8V 1T7; 48°25′04″N 123°22′17″W
- Minister responsible: Áʼa꞉líya Warbus, Minister of Environment
- Parent Ministry: Executive Council of British Columbia
- Website: gov.bc.ca/env

The Ministry of Environment and Parks is a ministry of the government of British Columbia in Canada. The ministry is responsible for the effective protection, management and conservation of the province's natural resources. It is currently overseen by Áʼa꞉líya Warbus.

== History ==
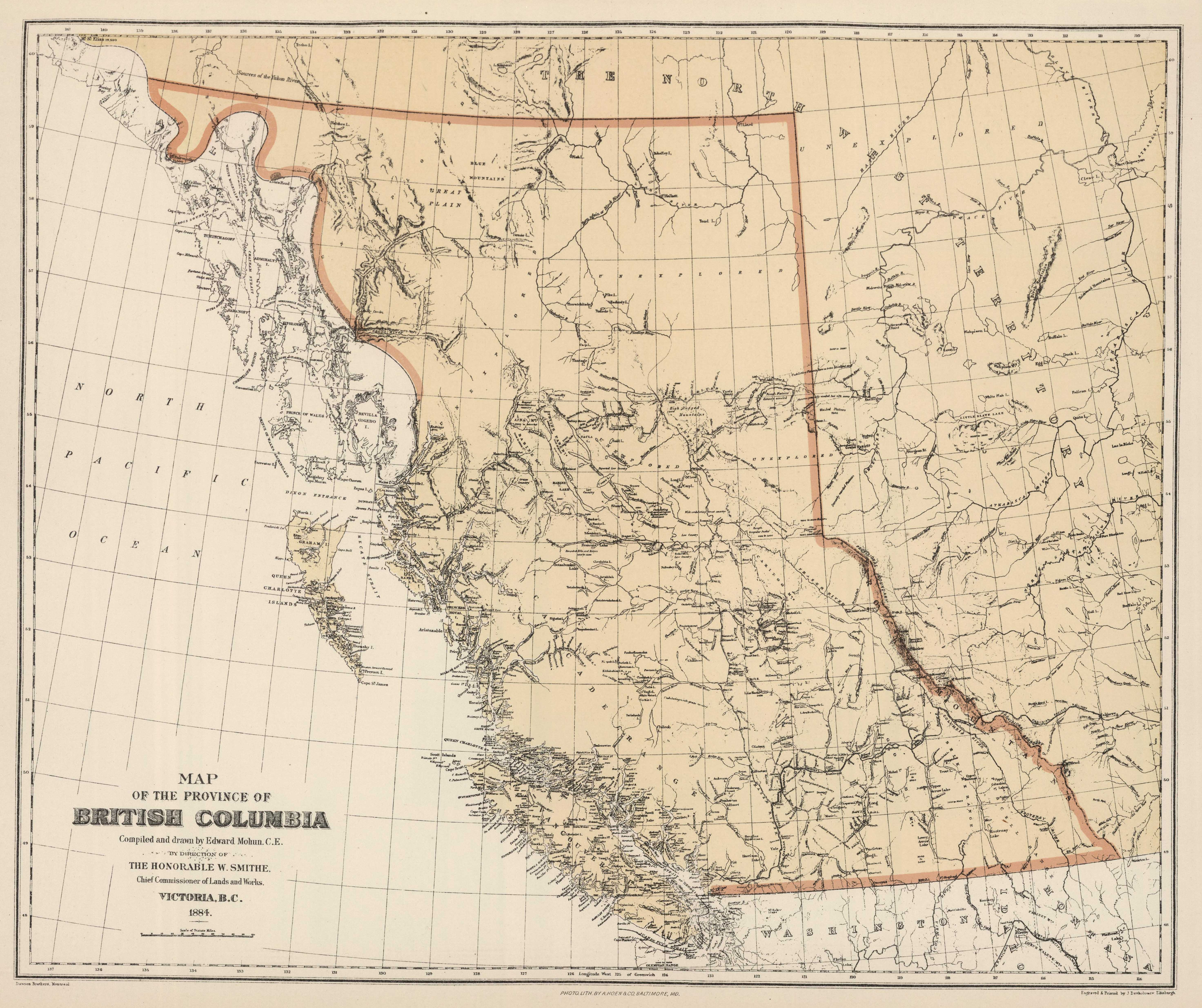
Map of British Columbia prepared by the Department of Lands and Works in 1884

=== Department of Lands and Works (1871-1908) ===
The "Department of Lands and Works" was established under the Constitution Act in 1871 following the admission of the Colony of British Columbia to the Dominion of Canada. The department was responsible for the management of Crown lands, surveying and mapping of Crown lands, construction and maintenance of public services, and encouragement of European settlement.

=== Department of Lands (1908-1945) ===
In 1908, the department was disestablished with an amendment to the Constitution Act and its functions were divided between the newly formed "Department of Lands" and "Department of Public Works", of which the former is the ancestor to the current ministry. The Department of Lands was responsible for the management of Crown lands, surveying and mapping of Crown lands, timber inspection, forest protection, and water rights management with respect to mining operations.

The Department of Lands was notable for overseeing the founding of British Columbia's first provincial park, Strathcona Provincial Park, in 1911.

=== Department of Lands, Forests, and Water Resources (1945-1974) ===
In 1945, the "Department of Lands" was re-established as the "Department of Lands and Forests". It was responsible for the management of all public lands, administration of water rights, and land settlement programs for returning soldiers. The department was renamed the "Department of Lands, Forests, and Water Resources" in 1962 following its reorganization into its three namesake branches: the B.C. Lands Service, B.C. Forest Service, and B.C. Water Resources Service. It retained the same responsibilities as its predecessor until the disestablishment of the department in 1975.

=== Ministry of Environment (1975-2017) ===
In 1975, the "Ministry of Environment" was established by an order in council under its first name: "Department of Environment". The original functions of the Department of Environment were transferred from the "Department of Lands, Forests and Water Resources", whose functions had been split between the "Ministry of Environment" and "Ministry of Forests". The department was responsible for the management and protection of land, air and water resources including Crown lands (except for matters under the jurisdiction of the Department of Forests), water rights, and pollution control. The department was divided into three branches: land and water management, environmental and engineering services, and environmental protection. Later in 1976, the Dept. of Environment was renamed the "Ministry of the Environment".

In 1978, a major government reorganization transferred functions relating to lands and parks from the "Ministry of the Environment" to the newly established "Ministry of Lands, Parks and Housing". At the same time, the "Ministry of the Environment" gained functions relating to marine resources and wildlife (from the former Ministry of Recreation and Conservation), environmental health (from the Ministry of Health), and emergency programming (from the Ministry of Provincial Secretary and Travel Industry). The reorganized "Ministry of the Environment" was divided into four branches: Land and Water Management, Environmental and Engineering Services, Environmental Protection, and Environment and Land Use Secretariat. The name was revised as just the "Ministry of Environment" the following year.

In 1986, the parks function from the "Ministry of Lands, Parks and Housing", was merged with the Ministry of Environment. As a result of this addition to its functions, the Ministry of Environment became known as the "Ministry of Environment and Parks". In 1988, the park function was removed and transferred to the newly established "Ministry of Parks". As a result, the name was reverted to the Ministry of Environment.

In 1991, the Ministry of Environment was disestablished and its functions were merged with those of the "Ministry of Lands and Parks" to create a new ministry called the "Ministry of Environment, Lands and Parks". The successor to this ministry was the "Ministry of Water, Land and Air Protection", existing from 2001 to 2005. The successor to this was the "Ministry of Environment", existing from 2005 to 2016. Throughout all of these successive name changes and restructurings, the ministry had retained the same functional responsibilities since 1991.

=== Ministry of Environment & Climate Change Strategy (2017-2024) ===
Following the 2017 British Columbia general election, the ministry was renamed the "Ministry of Environment & Climate Change Strategy" with an emphasis on directly addressing the issue of climate change in the province.

=== Ministry of Environment & Parks (2024-present) ===
Following the 2024 British Columbia general election, the ministry was renamed the "Ministry of Environment & Parks", led by Tamara Davidson.

== Operating units ==
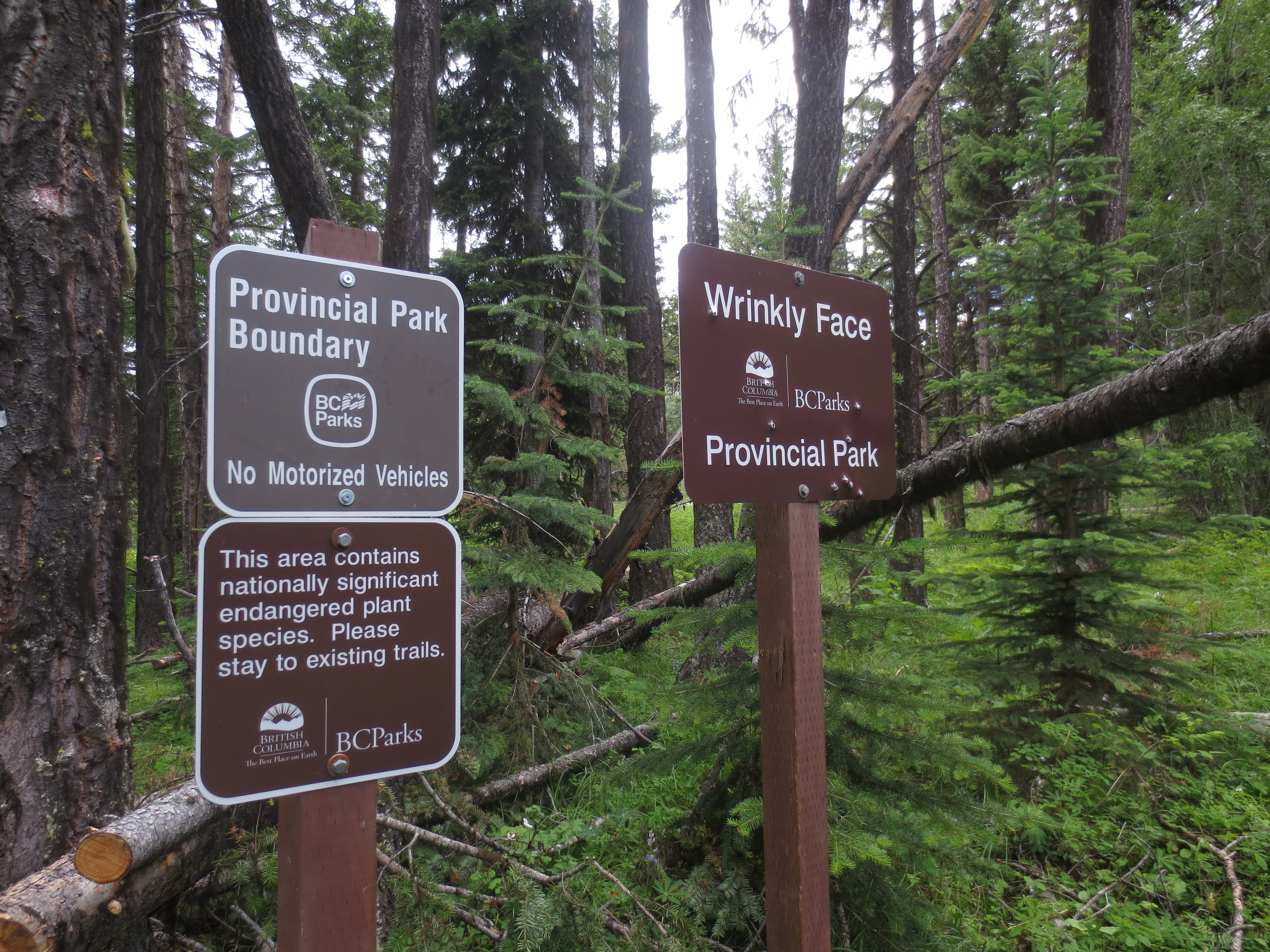
BC Parks signage in Wrinkly Face Provincial Park

The Ministry of Environment and Parks manages several secondary agencies:

- BC Parks: designates and manages protected areas throughout the province.
- Conservation Officer Service: enforces the environmental protection policies of British Columbia and Canada within the province.
- Environmental Assessment Office: coordinates and assesses the environmental impact of major development proposals in the province.

== Legislation ==
=== CleanBC ===
In December 2018, Premier John Horgan's NDP party and Andrew Weaver's Green party jointly announced CleanBC, a plan that would reach 75% of the province's greenhouse gas emissions target. The plan is designed to reduce emissions 40% by the year 2030, compared to 2007 levels. Most of the plan's funding is projected to come from BC's carbon tax. For buildings, the BC Building Code was amended to make all buildings “net zero energy ready” by 2032, the natural gas grid must contain 15% RNG and the province will assist in funding efficiency upgrades. For industry, the government agreed to help fund clean energy firms while improving the efficiency of existing manufacturing and fossil fuel operations. For transportation, all new cars sold from 2040 onward must be a zero-emissions vehicle, with other vehicle types being subject to stricter emissions regulation. For waste, the goals outlined in the plan are to divert 95% of biodegradable waste from landfills and capture 75% of landfill emissions.

=== Water Sustainability Act ===
The Water Sustainability Act (WSA) was enacted on February 29, 2016 to ensure and manage the sustainable supply, diversion, and use of water in BC. It includes changes on:

- "Licensing groundwater for non-domestic use
- New fees and rentals for water use
- Stronger protection for aquatic ecosystems
- Expanding protection of groundwater related to well construction and maintenance
- Increasing dam safety and awareness."

=== Recycling Regulation ===
In 2011, the British Columbia announced plans to transfer the cost of recycling for packaging and printed paper from municipal governments to product manufactures. The non-for-profit Recycle BC began operations on May 11, 2014, to fulfill the collection and recycling of these goods on behalf of these companies.

As of December 2018, British Columbia had 17 extended producer responsibility categories.

== See also ==
- Environment and Climate Change Canada
- Alberta Ministry of Environment and Parks
