= Casavant v British Columbia =

British Columbia legal case

Casavant v British Columbia, BCCA 159, was a landmark environmental legal case heard at the British Columbia Court of Appeal in 2020. A unanimous court allowed the appeal.

In July 2015, a BC Conservation Officer, Bryce Casavant, received an order to kill two bear cubs in a remote location on Vancouver Island, off the coast of BC. The Conservation Officer declined the kill order. The bear cubs were not killed. The bear cubs were instead transferred to a veterinarian facility and then placed in a rehabilitation facility where they were later released into the wilds of British Columbia. In BC, Conservation Officers are also special constables with unlimited police powers. He was instead given a position in a different ministry with the same pay, but without Special Provincial Constable designation.

The situation sparked worldwide outrage and was covered nationally within Canada and internationally around the world.

The case was heard before a labour arbitrator and then a judge of the Supreme Court of British Columbia, who did not side with Officer Casavant. The BC Court of Appeal overruled the BC Supreme Court, stating that labour arbitrators have no jurisdiction in police discipline matters. All previous decisions against the officer were declared a "nullity" by the high court.

A subsequent attempt to have the matter reopened was dismissed by the Supreme Court of Canada.
