= Recycle BC =

- Formerly: Multi-Material B.C.
- Industry: Recycling paper and packaging
- Founded: May 19, 2014; 12 years ago
- Headquarters: North Vancouver, British Columbia
- Areas served: 5.6 million households in British Columbia
- Key people: Sam Baker (Executive Director)
- Website: recyclebc.ca

Recycle BC (previously known as Multi-Material B.C.) is a not-for-profit organization which manages residential packaging and paper recycling in British Columbia. The not-for-profit was created in 2014, after a 2011 law by the British Columbia Ministry of Environment, transferring the cost of recycling from residents to producers. Producers who sell products in British Columbia pay fees to Recycle BC for the packaging and paper supplied on a quarterly basis determined by how many kilograms of each material they sold in the province. Items collected are sorted and sold to end-markets for processing into new products.

== Overview ==
Recycle BC manages recycling collected from 156 communities which include 1.8 million households (98% of British Columbia's population). In 13 of these communities, Recycle BC also manages the collection of materials directly from households. The remaining communities receive curbside and multi-family recycling collection paid for by Recycle BC. Items accepted by the program can differ depending on the community, but typically include paper, cardboard, plastic containers, metal containers, cartons, paper cups. Some areas also have separate bins for the collection of glass bottles and jars; however, they are only accepted at depots in most areas. Collected plastics are processed within the province through a contract with Green by Nature.

The three major newspaper companies in British Columbia (Postmedia Network, Black Press and Glacier Media) have refused to pay their fees, resulting in the provincial government sending the publishers warning notices in 2016. In 2017, News Media Canada created their own stewardship plan, which uses operational elements of the Recycle BC system to recycle newsprint.

A pilot project was conducted in Coquitlam from May – August 2018 to recycle squeeze tubes, making it the first city in North America to accept the item through curbside recycling.

=== Collection done by Recycle BC ===
- Anmore
- Coquitlam
- Langley (city)
- Prince George
- Quesnel
- Regional District of North Okanagan
- Regional District of Kootenay Boundary (Kootenay Region)
- Revelstoke
- University Endowment Lands
- Pitt Meadows
- Regional District of Central Kootenay (areas H, I, J)
- Vancouver
- Regional District of Kootenay Boundary (Boundary Region)

== Recycling depots ==
Recycle BC has contracts with private companies which operate recycling depots and are paid by the kilogram per material type. Most depots accept curbside recycling items; however, some only collect polystyrene foam, plastic bags and glass (in some communities). In June 2018, a pilot program began at 116 depots in the province to collect flexible plastics. Items accepted in this new program include cellophane, zipper storage bags, bubble wrap, chip bags, granola bar wrappers, net bags for produce, plastic shipping envelopes and woven rice bags. London Drugs stores in the province also act as Recycle BC depots.

== Curbside recycling ==
In August 2016, Recycle BC began a pilot program with the City of Vancouver consisting of 31 sets of bins, including for paper and mixed containers. They are located in the West End and the pilot program ran until the end of 2017. As of July 2018, the bins were still in place

As of June 1, 2025, Recycle BC has expanded its curbside collection to include flexible plastics in West Vancouver and Maple Ridge.

== Criticism ==
A CBC investigation in 2019 found that of three Recycle BC contractors, Waste Connections, GFL, and Merlin Plastics, only Merlin Plastics recycled their material. Recycle BC approves the end markets for all of our materials before they are transferred, and with the plastic from this investigation, it was found that Recycle BC sends almost all of its plastics to Merlin Plastics, who recycles this material; only less than 1% of plastic is shipped overseas in the form of densified polystyrene, which is only a portion of the foam Recycle BC collects.

Recycle BC also received criticism when the of Osoyoos eliminated blue bags and non-reusable clear bags in July 2020 and complained over having to use their own reusable containers, such as carts, cans, bins or sacs. As of Fall 2025, the town will switch to a modernized, efficient, safer, and modernized system for curbside recycling
