= Atlantic Salmon Federation =

Conservation organization

The Atlantic Salmon Federation (ASF) is a non-government conservation organization established in Montreal in 1948.

The Federation is dedicated to the conservation, protection and restoration of wild Atlantic salmon and the ecosystems on which their well being and survival depend.

ASF's headquarters are in St. Andrews, New Brunswick, Canada, with regional offices in each of the Atlantic provinces, Quebec, and Maine.

ASF has a network of five regional councils (New Brunswick, Nova Scotia, Newfoundland and Labrador, Quebec, and Maine, which cover the freshwater range of wild Atlantic salmon in Canada and the United States.
