= Smoltification =

Complex series of physiological changes in young salmon

Smoltification (also known as Parr-Smolt transformation) is a complex series of physiological changes where young salmonid fish adapt from living in fresh water to living in seawater. Physiological changes during smoltification include modified body shape, increased skin reflectance (the measure of the proportion of light or other radiation striking a surface which is reflected off it.), and increased Na^{+}/K^{+}-ATPase in the gills. A number of mechanisms assist with osmoregulation.
