= British Columbia Conservation Officer Service =

British Columbia law enforcement agency

- Armorial bearings of BC COS
- Common name: Conservation officer
- Abbreviation: BCCOS
- Motto: Integrity, Service and Protection

Agency overview
- Formed: 1980

Jurisdictional structure
- Operations jurisdiction: British Columbia, Canada
- Legal jurisdiction: Province of British Columbia
- Governing body: Ministry of Environment and Parks (British Columbia)
- Constituting instrument: Environmental Management Act

Operational structure
- Headquarters: Victoria, BC
- Elected officer responsible: The Honourable Áʼa꞉líya Warbus, Minister of Environment
- Agency executive: Chief CO Doug Forsdick (Re't). Chief CO Cameron Schley (appointed)., chief conservation officer

Website
- Conservation Officer Service Homepage

The British Columbia Conservation Officer Service (BCCOS) is responsible for protecting the environment and natural resources in British Columbia. Conservation officers are peace officers, armed, and enforce 6 federal statutes and 25 provincial statutes, including the Species at Risk Act, Liquor Control and Licensing Act, Wildlife Act and Environmental Management Act.

The Province of BC states: "Conservation Officers are highly trained, dedicated individuals [...] they hold Special Provincial Constable Status under the Police Act and have unrestricted appointment to enforce Acts and Statues, and protect the public and preserve the peace. They work with private and public partners such as the Ministry of Forests, Lands, and Natural Resource Operations Resource Officers, the RCMP, Environment Canada, the Department of Fisheries, First Nations, and local and provincial stakeholders to reduce human-wildlife conflict."

The COS is headquartered at Victoria and operates out of 44 office locations. The COS is involved in outreach and education, compliance monitoring and verification, public reporting, investigations and enforcement actions.

== History and highlights ==
On July 1, 1905, British Columbia established the department for the Protection of Game and Forests, hired the first game and forest warden which eventually grew into the BCCOS today.

From 1918 to 1929, game wardens were abolished and the British Columbia Provincial Police took over the responsibility of enforcing wildlife legislations.

In 1961, game wardens were officially renamed "conservation officers".

In 1980, Conservation Officer Services became a distinct part of the ministry.

In 1983, conservation officers are appointed as special provincial constable. Up until 1987, all COs were males.

Between the years of 1997–2000, COs were given a much wider authority in their law enforcement duties, including the ability to conduct surveillance, seize property and to arrest and detain.

In 2002, chief conservation officer became a legislated position and was placed in charge of BCCOS. They can now designate anyone to become conservation officers, auxiliary conservation officers or special conservation officers, depending on the needs of the agency.

July 1, 2005, marked the 100th anniversary of the first appointment of a game warden.

== Officers ==
At one time the service had regular and seasonal officers. Currently, there are full-time regular and special conservation officers.

=== Ranks ===
- Conservation officer
- Corporal
- Sergeant
- Staff sergeant
- Department Sergeant Major
- Inspector
- Deputy chief conservation officer
- Chief conservation officer

== Handling of bears ==
Conservation officers sometimes euthanize wildlife they deem a risk to public safety or property. Some of these incidents have been the subject of controversy.

Accounts of bears being tranquilized and dying, falling out of trees, and the high number of bear cubs (bears of the year) killed, compared to those sent to rehabilitation have resulted in numerous media articles and critical questions about protocol, decision-making, and oversight. Another incident involving a bear which was cornered by a conservation officer on a marina and not given a means of escape is under examination in media and throughout social media. The officer responsible in this case is the same officer who ordered Officer Bryce Casavant to kill two bear cubs.

In spring of 2015, Conservation Officer Bryce Casavant did not follow orders to kill the two cubs of a female bear who was killed after she continued to raid a freezer full of meat and salmon. Casavant took the cubs to a veterinary hospital, and they were then transferred to a rehabilitation facility which eventually released them into their natural environment. He was suspended for refusing to follow the order, despite the cubs showing no signs of being a danger to people or property. The suspension, and subsequent public outcry, generated international media attention, including a tweet from popular British comedian Ricky Gervais. The two bear cubs the Conservation Officer Service ordered killed were successfully rehabilitated and released by North Island Wildlife Recovery Centre.

== Calls for police oversight ==
There have been recent calls for greater public oversight of the BCCOS in media. Further, some scholars have insisted the agency be properly designated as a provincial police force for accountability reasons and have called for the killing of bear cubs to cease. This is in addition to previous news outlets referring to inappropriate government killing of animals.
