= Environmental Assessment Office =

The Environmental Assessment Office is a Crown Agency of the provincial government of British Columbia, Canada. Its mandate is to coordinate assessments of major development proposals in British Columbia. It reports to the provincial Minister of Environment.

== History ==
The EAO was established in 2002 via the Environmental Assessment Act, 2002. The EAO's activities were governed by a quasi-judicial Executive Director.

The legislation was renewed in 2018, by the Environmental Assessment Act, 2018.

== Controversies ==
In February 2020, it came to light that the EAO was instrumental in approving the Coastal GasLink Pipeline project, on 23 October 2014. The EAO, which acknowledged concerns from, among others, the Office of the Hereditary Chiefs of the Wetʼsuwetʼen, recommended that the ministry of the first Clark government approve the project, which in the event, it did.
