= Department of Conservation =

Department of Conservation may refer to a number of environmental ministries:

== United States ==
- California Department of Conservation
- Massachusetts Department of Conservation and Recreation
- Missouri Department of Conservation

== Elsewhere ==
- Agriculture, Fisheries and Conservation Department, Hong Kong
- Department of Conservation (New Zealand)
- Department of Conservation and Land Management (Western Australia)
- Department of Environment and Conservation (Western Australia)

== See also ==
- Department of Environment and Conservation (disambiguation)
- Department of Environmental Management (disambiguation)
- Department of Environmental Protection (disambiguation)
- Department of Natural Resources (disambiguation)
