= List of law enforcement agencies in Michigan =

This is a list of law enforcement agencies in the state of Michigan.

According to the US Bureau of Justice Statistics' 2008 Census of State and Local Law Enforcement Agencies, the state had 571 law enforcement agencies employing 19,009 sworn police officers, about 190 for each 100,000 residents.

== State agencies ==
- Michigan Department of Corrections
- Michigan Department of Natural Resources
  - Michigan Conservation Officers
- Michigan State Police

== Multi-jurisdictional narcotics enforcement teams ==
  - Bay Area Narcotics Enforcement Team (BAYANET)
  - Central Michigan Enforcement Team (CMET)
  - County of Macomb Enforcement (COMET)
  - Flint Area Narcotics Group (FANG)
  - Huron Undercover Narcotics Team (HUNT)
  - Jackson Narcotics Enforcement Team (JNET)
  - Kent County Silent Observer (KNET)
  - Livingston and Washtenaw Counties Narcotics Enforcement Team (LAWNET)
  - Mid-Michigan Area Group Enforcement Team (MAGNET)
  - Mid-Michigan Investigative Narcotics Team (MINT)
  - Monroe Area Narcotics Team and Investigative Services (MANTIS)
  - Region of Irish Hills Narcotics Office (RHINO)
  - Southwest Enforcement Team (SWET)
  - State, Sheriffs, Chiefs Narcotics Enforcement (SSCENT)
  - Straits Area Narcotics Enforcement (SANE)
  - Strike Team Investigative Narcotics Group (STING)
  - Thumb Area Narcotics Unit (TNU)
  - Traverse Narcotics Team (TNT)
  - Tri-County Metro Narcotics Team (TCM)
  - Upper Peninsula Substance Enforcement Team (UPSET)
  - West Michigan Enforcement Team (WEMET)

== County agencies ==
- Alcona County Sheriff's Office
- Alger County Sheriff's Office
- Allegan County Sheriff's Office
- Alpena County Sheriff's Office
- Antrim County Sheriff's Office
- Arenac County Sheriff's Office
- Baraga County Sheriff's Office
- Barry County Sheriff's Office
- Bay County Sheriff's Office
- Benzie County Sheriff's Office
- Berrien County Sheriff's Office
- Branch County Sheriff's Office
- Calhoun County Sheriff's Office
- Cass County Sheriff's Office
- Charlevoix County Sheriff's Office
- Cheboygan County Sheriff's Office
- Chippewa County Sheriff's Office
- Clare County Sheriff's Office
- Clinton County Sheriff's Office
- Crawford County Sheriff's Office
- Delta County Sheriff's Office
- Dickinson County Sheriff's Office
- Eaton County Sheriff's Office
- Emmet County Sheriff's Office
- Genesee County Sheriff's Office
- Gladwin County Sheriff's Office
- Gogebic County Sheriff's Office
- Grand Traverse County Sheriff's Office
- Gratiot County Sheriff's Office
- Hillsdale County Sheriff's Office
- Houghton County Sheriff's Office
- Huron County Sheriff's Office
- Ingham County Sheriff's Office
- Ionia County Sheriff's Office
- Iosco County Sheriff's Office
- Iron County Sheriff's Office
- Isabella County Sheriff's Office
- Jackson County Sheriff's Office
- Kalamazoo County Sheriff's Office
- Kalkaska County Sheriff's Office
- Kent County Sheriff's Office
- Keweenaw County Sheriff's Office
- Lake County Sheriff's Office
- Lapeer County Sheriff's Office
- Leelanau County Sheriff's Office
- Lenawee County Sheriff's Office
- Livingston County Sheriff's Office
- Luce County Sheriff's Office
- Mackinac County Sheriff's Office
- Macomb County Sheriff's Office
- Manistee County Sheriff's Office
- Marquette County Sheriff's Office
- Mason County Sheriff's Office
- Mecosta County Sheriff's Office
- Menominee County Sheriff's Office
- Midland County Sheriff's Office
- Missaukee County Sheriff's Office
- Monroe County Sheriff's Office
- Montcalm County Sheriff's Office
- Montmorency County Sheriff's Office
- Muskegon County Sheriff's Office
- Newaygo County Sheriff's Office
- Oakland County Sheriff's Office
- Oceana County Sheriff's Office
- Ogemaw County Sheriff's Office
- Ontonagon County Sheriff's Office
- Osceola County Sheriff's Office
- Oscoda County Sheriff's Office
- Otsego County Sheriff's Office
- Ottawa County Sheriff's Office
- Presque Isle County Sheriff's Office
- Roscommon County Sheriff's Office
- Saginaw County Sheriff's Office
- Saint Clair County Sheriff's Office
- Saint Joseph County Sheriff's Office
- Sanilac County Sheriff's Office
- Schoolcraft County Sheriff's Office
- Shiawassee County Sheriff's Office
- Tuscola County Sheriff's Office
- Van Buren County Sheriff's Office
- Washtenaw County Sheriff's Office
- Wayne County Sheriff's Office
- Wexford County Sheriff's Office

== Municipal agencies ==
- Adrian Police Department
- Akron Police Department
- Albion Department of Public Safety
- Allegan Police Department
- Allen Park Police Department
- Alma Department of Public Safety
- Almont Police Department
- Alpena Police Department
- Ann Arbor Police Department
- Armada Police Department
- Au Gres Police Department
- Auburn Hills Police Department
- Augusta Police Department
- Bad Axe Police Department
- Bancroft Police Department
- Bangor Police Department
- Baraga Police Department
- Barryton Police Department
- Battle Creek Police Department
- Bay City Department of Public Safety
- Beaverton Police Department
- Belding Police Department
- Bellaire Police Department
- Belleville Police Department
- Bellevue Police Department
- Benton Harbor Police Department
- Berkley Department of Public Safety
- Beverly Hills Department of Public Safety
- Big Rapids Department of Public Safety
- Birch Run Police Department
- Birmingham Police Department
- Blissfield Police Department
- Bloomfield Hills Department of Public Safety
- Boyne City Police Department
- Breckenridge Police Department
- Bridgeman Police Department
- Bridgeport Police Department
- Brighton Police Department
- Bronson Police Department
- Brown City Police Department
- Buchanan Police Department
- Burton Police Department
- Cadillac Police Department
- Carleton Police Department
- Caro Police Department
- Carson City Police Department
- Caseville Police Department
- Caspian Police Department
- Cass City Police Department
- Cassopolis Police Department
- Center Line Department of Public Safety
- Central Lake Police Department
- Charlevoix Police Department
- Charlotte Police Department
- Cheboygan Department of Public Safety
- Chelsea Police Department
- Chesaning Police Department
- Clare Police Department
- Clawson Police Department
- Clinton Police Department
- Clio Police Department
- Coldwater Police Department
- Coleman Police Department
- Colon Police Department
- Constantine Police Department
- Corunna Police Department
- Croswell Police Department
- Crystal Falls Police Department
- Davison Police Department
- Dearborn Heights Police Department
- Dearborn Police Department
- Decatur Police Department
- Deckerville Police Department
- Detroit Police Department
- DeWitt Police Department
- Douglas Police Department
- Dowagiac Police Department
- Dundee Police Department
- Durand Police Department
- East Grand Rapids Department of Public Safety
- East Jordan Police Department
- East Lansing Police Department
- East Tawas Police Department
- Eastpointe Police Department
- Eaton Rapids Police Department
- Eau Claire Police Department
- Ecorse Police Department
- Elk Rapids Police Department
- Elkton Police Department
- Ellsworth Police Department
- Elsie Police Department
- Escanaba Department of Public Safety
- Essexville Department of Public Safety
- Evart Police Department
- Farmington Department of Public Safety
- Farmington Hills Police Department
- Fennville Police Department
- Fenton Police Department
- Ferndale Police Department
- Flat Rock Police Department
- Flint Police Department
- Flushing Police Department
- Fowlerville Police Department
- Frankenmuth Police Department
- Frankfort Police Department
- Franklin Police Department
- Fraser Department of Public Safety
- Freeport Police Department
- Fremont Police Department
- Gagetown Police Department
- Galien Police Department (Michigan) Galien Police Department
- Garden City Police Department
- Gaylord Police Department
- Gibraltar Police Department
- Gladstone Department of Public Safety
- Gladwin Police Department
- Grand Beach-Michiana Police Department
- Grand Blanc Police Department
- Grand Haven Department of Public Safety
- Grand Ledge Police Department
- Grand Rapids Police Department
- Grandville Police Department
- Grant Police Department
- Grayling Police Department
- Greenville Department of Public Safety
- Grosse Pointe Department of Public Safety
- Grosse Pointe Farms Department of Public Safety
- Grosse Pointe Park Department of Public Safety
- Grosse Pointe Shores Department of Public Safety
- Grosse Pointe Woods Police Department
- Hamtramck Police Department
- Hancock Police Department
- Harbor Beach Police Department
- Harbor Springs Police Department
- Harper Woods Police Department
- Hart Police Department
- Hartford Police Department
- Hastings Police Department
- Hazel Park Police Department
- Hesperia Police Department
- Highland Park Department of Public Safety
- Hillsdale Police Department
- Holland Department of Public Safety
- Holly Police Department
- Houghton Police Department
- Howard City Police Department
- Howell Police Department
- Hudson Police Department
- Huntington Woods Department of Public Safety
- Imlay City Police Department
- Inkster Police Department
- Ionia Department of Public Safety
- Iron Mountain Police Department
- Iron River Police Department
- Ironwood Department of Public Safety
- Ishpeming Police Department
- Jackson Police Department
- Jonesville Police Department
- Kalamazoo Department of Public Safety
- Kalkaska Department of Public Safety
- Keego Harbor Police Department
- Kentwood Police Department
- Kinde Police Department
- Kingsford Department of Public Safety
- Kingston Police Department
- L'Anse Police Department
- Laingsburg Police Department
- Lake Angelus Police Department
- Lake Linden Police Department
- Lake Odessa Police Department
- Lake Orion Police Department
- Lakeview Police Department
- Lansing Police Department
- Lapeer Police Department
- Lathrup Village Police Department
- Laurium Police Department
- Lawrence Police Department
- Lawton Police Department
- Lennon Police Department
- Leslie Police Department
- Lexington Police Department
- Lincoln Park Police Department
- Linden Police Department
- Litchfield Police Department
- Livonia Police Department
- Lowell Police Department
- Ludington Police Department
- Luna Pier Police Department
- Mackinac Island Police Department
- Mackinaw City Police Department
- Madison Heights Police Department
- Mancelona Police Department
- Manistee Police Department
- Manistique Department of Public Safety
- Manton Police Department
- Marine City Police Department
- Marlette Police Department
- Marquette Police Department
- Marshall Police Department
- Marysville Police Department
- Mason Police Department
- Mattawan Police Department
- Mayville Police Department
- Melvindale Police Department
- Memphis Police Department
- Mendon Police Department
- Menominee Police Department
- Midland Police Department
- Milan Police Department
- Milford Police Department
- Millington Police Department
- Minden City Police Department
- Monroe Police Department
- Montague Police Department
- Morenci Police Department
- Morley Police Department
- Morrice Police Department
- Mount Morris Police Department
- Mount Pleasant Police Department
- Munising Police Department
- Muskegon Heights Police Department
- Muskegon Police Department
- Nashville Police Department
- Negaunee Police Department
- New Baltimore Police Department
- New Buffalo Police Department
- New Era Police Department
- New Lothrop Police Department
- Newaygo Police Department
- Niles Police Department
- North Muskegon Police Department
- Northville Police Department
- Norton Shores Police Department
- Norway Police Department
- Novi Police Department
- Oak Park Department of Public Safety
- Oakley Police Department
- Olivet Police Department
- Orchard Lake Police Department
- Otisville Police Department
- Otsego Police Department
- Ovid Police Department
- Owendale Police Department
- Owosso Police Department
- Oxford Police Department
- Paw Paw Police Department
- Peck Police Department
- Pentwater Police Department
- Perry Police Department
- Petoskey Department of Public Safety
- Pigeon Police Department
- Pinckney Police Department
- Pinconning Police Department
- Plainwell Department of Public Safety
- Pleasant Ridge Police Department
- Plymouth Police Department
- Port Austin Police Department
- Port Huron Police Department
- Portage Police Department
- Portland Police Department
- Potterville Police Department
- Quincy Police Department
- Reading Police Department
- Reed City Police Department
- Reese Police Department
- Richland Police Department
- Richmond Police Department
- River Rouge Police Department
- Riverview Police Department
- Rochester Police Department
- Rockford Department of Public Safety
- Rockwood Police Department
- Rogers City Police Department
- Romeo Police Department
- Romulus Police Department
- Roosevelt Park Police Department
- Rose City Police Department
- Roseville Police Department
- Rothbury Police Department
- Royal Oak Police Department
- Saginaw Police Department
- Saline Police Department
- Sandusky Police Department
- Sault Ste Marie Police Department
- Schoolcraft Police Department
- Shelby Police Department
- Shepherd Police Department
- South Haven Police Department
- South Lyon Police Department
- South Rockwood Police Department
- Southfield Police Department
- Southgate Police Department
- Sparta Police Department
- St. Charles Police Department
- St. Clair City Police Department
- St. Clair Shores Police Department
- St. Ignace Police Department
- St. Johns Police Department
- St. Joseph Department of Public Safety
- St. Louis Police Department
- Stanton Police Department
- Sterling Heights Police Department
- Stockbridge Police Department
- Sturgis Police Department
- Sylvan Lake Police Department
- Tawas City Police Department
- Taylor Police Department
- Tecumseh Police Department
- Three Oaks Police Department
- Three Rivers Police Department
- Traverse City Police Department
- Trenton Police Department
- Troy Police Department
- Ubly Police Department
- Union City Police Department
- Unionville Police Department
- Utica Police Department
- Vassar Police Department
- Vernon Police Department
- Vicksburg Police Department
- Walker Police Department
- Walkerville Police Department
- Walled Lake Police Department
- Warren Police Department
- Watervliet Police Department
- Wayland Police Department
- Wayne Police Department
- West Branch Police Department
- Westland Police Department
- White Cloud Police Department
- White Pigeon Police Department
- Whitehall Police Department
- Williamston Police Department
- Wixom Police Department
- Wolverine Lake Village Police Department
- Woodhaven Police Department
- Wyandotte Police Department
- Wyoming Police Department
- Yale Police Department
- Ypsilanti Police Department
- Zeeland Police Department
- Zilwaukee Police Department

== Township agencies ==
- Adrian Township Police Department
- Argentine Township Police Department
- Baroda-Lake Township Police Department
- Barry Township Police Department
- Bath Township Police Department
- Benton Township Police Department
- Blackman-Leoni Township Department of Public Safety
- Bloomfield Township Police Department
- Bridgeport Township Police Department
- Brownstown Township Police Department
- Buena Vista Township Police Department
- Cambridge Township Police Department
- Canton Township Department of Public Safety
- Carrollton Township Police Department
- Chesterfield Township Police Department
- Chikaming Township Police Department
- Chocolay Township Police Department
- Clay Township Police Department
- Clayton Township Police Department
- Clinton Township Police Department
- Coloma Township Police Department
- Columbia Township Police Department
- Covert Township Police Department
- Davison Township Police Department
- Denton Township Police Department
- DeWitt Township Police Department
- Dryden Township Police Department
- Emmett Township Department of Public Safety
- Erie Township Police Department
- Fairhaven Township Police Department
- Flint Township Police Department
- Flushing Township Police Department
- Forsyth Township Police Department
- Fruitport Township Police Department
- Garfield Township Police Department
- Genesee Township Police Department
- Gerrish Township Police Department
- Grand Blanc Township Police Department
- Green Oak Charter Township Police Department
- Grosse Ile Township Police Department
- Hamburg Township Police Department
- Hampton Township Department of Public Safety
- Home Township Police Department
- Huron Township Police Department
- Indianfields Township Police Department
- Ishpeming Township Police Department
- Kalamazoo Township Police Department
- Kinross Township Police Department
- Lansing Township Police Department
- Lapeer Township Police Department
- Lincoln Township Police Department
- Madison Township Police Department
- Marenisco Township Police Department
- Meridian Township Police Department
- Metamora Township Police Department
- Montrose Township Police Department
- Mount Morris Township Police Department
- Muskegon Township Police Department
- Napoleon Township Police Department
- Northfield Township Police Department
- Northville Township Department of Public Safety
- Ontwa Township-Edwardsburg Police Department
- Oscoda Township Police Department
- Pittsfield Township Department of Public Safety
- Plymouth Township Police Department
- Prairieville Township Police Department
- Raisin Township Department of Public Safety
- Redford Township Police Department
- Richfield Township Department of Public Safety (Roscommon County)
- Richfield Township Police Department (Genesee County)
- Saginaw Township Police Department
- Shelby Township Police Department
- Silver Creek Township Police Department
- Somerset Township Police Department
- Spring Arbor Township Police Department
- Springport Township Police Department
- St. Joseph Township Police Department
- Sumpter Township Police Department
- Thomas Township Police Department
- Tittabawassee Township Police Department
- Tuscarora Township Police Department
- Unadilla Township Police Department
- Van Buren Township Department of Public Safety
- Waterford Township Police Department
- Watersmeet Township Police Department
- West Bloomfield Township Police Department
- White Lake Township Police Department
- Woodland Township Police Department

== College and university agencies ==
- Central Michigan University Police Department
- Delta Community College Department of Public Safety
- Eastern Michigan University Police Department
- Ferris State University Department of Public Safety
- Grand Rapids Community College Police
- Grand Valley State University Department of Public Safety
- Kalamazoo Valley Community College Department of Public Safety
- Kellogg Community College Department of Public Safety
- Kirtland Community College Department of Public Safety
- Lansing Community College Police Department
- Macomb Community College Police Department
- Michigan State University Police Department
- Michigan Technological University Department of Public Safety
- Mott Community College Department of Public Safety
- Northern Michigan University Police Department
- Oakland Community College Department of Public Safety
- Oakland University Police Department
- Saginaw Valley State University Police
- Schoolcraft College Police Department
- University of Michigan-Dearborn Department of Public Safety
- University of Michigan Department of Public Safety
- University of Michigan-Flint Department of Public Safety
- Wayne County Community College Police Authority
- Wayne State University Department of Public Safety
- Western Michigan University Police Department

== Park and school police departments ==
- Detroit Public Schools Community District Police Department
- Huron-Clinton Metropolitan Authority
- Metro Police Authority of Genesee County

== Transit agencies ==
- Detroit Transit Police Department

== Airport police agencies ==
- Bishop International Airport Authority
- Capital Region Airport Authority Police Department
- Cherry City Airport Police Department
- Gerald R. Ford International Airport Police
- Wayne County Airport Authority Department of Public Safety

== Railroad police ==
- Adrian-Blissfield Railroad Police
- Amtrak Police
- Canadian National Railroad Police
- Canadian Pacific Kansas City Railroad Police Department
- CSX Transportation Railroad Police Department
- Norfolk Southern Railroad Police

== Tribal agencies ==
- Bay Mills Tribal Police Department
- Grand Traverse Band Tribal Police Department
- Gun Lake Tribe Department of Public Safety
- Hannahville Tribal Police
- Huron Potawatomi Police Department
- Keweenaw Bay Tribal Police Department
- Lac Vieux Desert Tribal Police Department
- Little River Band of Ottawa Indians Department of Public Safety
- Pokagon Tribal Police
- Saginaw Chippewa Tribal Police Department
- Sault Ste. Marie Tribe Police Department

== Defunct agencies ==
- Algonac Police Department
- Cedar Springs Police Department
- Clarkston Police Department
- Coloma Police Department
- Coopersville City Police
- Galesburg Police Department
- Howard Township Police Department
- Middleville Police Department
- Mount Clemens Police Department
- New Haven Police Department
- Niles Township Police Department
- Parchment Police Department
- Pontiac Police Department
- Ross Township Police Department
- Sand Lake Police Department
- Scottville Police Department
- Sodus Township Police Department
- Spring Lake Village Police (Later Spring Lake / Ferrysburg Police)
- Spring Lake / Ferrysburg Police Department
- Sunfield Township Police Department
- Vermontville Police Department
- Weesaw Township Police Department

== See also ==
- Crime in Michigan
