= Department of Environmental Protection (disambiguation) =

Department of Environmental Protection (DEP) may refer to:

== United States ==
- Connecticut Department of Environmental Protection
- Florida Department of Environmental Protection
- Massachusetts Department of Environmental Protection
- New Jersey Department of Environmental Protection
- New York City Department of Environmental Protection
- Pennsylvania Department of Environmental Protection

== See also ==
- Department of Conservation (disambiguation)
- Department of Environment and Conservation (disambiguation)
- Department of Environmental Management (disambiguation)
- Department of Natural Resources (disambiguation)
- List of environmental agencies in the United States
- List of environmental ministries
