= United States Congressional International Conservation Caucus =

International Conservation Caucus
- Founded: September 2003; 23 years ago
- Ideology: Conservationism
- Seats in House Democratic Caucus: 42 / 220
- Seats in House Republican Conference: 49 / 211
- Seats in Senate Democratic Caucus: 16 / 48
- Seats in Senate Republican Conference: 18 / 50

The U.S. Congressional International Conservation Caucus, founded in September 2003, is a bipartisan congressional organization with the conviction that “the United States of America has the opportunity, the obligation and the interests to advance the conservation of natural resources for this and future generations,” and a commitment to promote U.S. leadership in public/private conservation partnerships worldwide.

These partnerships are supported in order to ensure stewardship for natural resources that can lead to habitat and biodiversity protection, poverty alleviation, economic development and regional safety. The ICC constitutes the second largest bipartisan congressional caucus, with over 1/3 of the U.S. House of Representatives, and over 1/4 of the U.S. Senate as acting members.

== History ==
A popular social movement in the late 1800s pushed conservation of natural resources to the top of the national agenda. The leaders of the movement were concerned that poor land management would put long-term national interests at risk, as well as destroy future Americans' natural heritage. Under President Theodore Roosevelt, the United States placed 230,000,000 acres of land under national protection to conserve natural assets for the long-term use of future generations.

A new wave of conservationism emerged in the early 21st century inspired by America's history of sound natural resource management; they were united by the conviction that the United States of America should take steps to export these practices throughout the world, helping strengthen national security.

The International Conservation Caucus was founded in September 2003 by Representatives Clay Shaw (R-FL), John Tanner (D-TN), Ed Royce (R-CA), and Tom Udall (D-NM) to preserve the influence and motivation needed to provide continual support to critical conservation projects.

== Guiding principles ==
- All actions must be grounded in respect for the sovereignty, cultures, and traditions of the nations in which programs are implemented.
- Careful account must be given to local community concerns and needs.
- Sound science is fundamental to designing effective conservation strategies.
- Protected areas are a cornerstone of successful and sustainable conservation.
- Conservation should be linked with efforts to promote good governance, strengthen rule of law, reduce poverty, encourage economic development, nurture democratic institutions, advance education, and improve public health.
- Conservation requires collaboration among governments, civil society organizations, the private sector, international institutions, and others.

== 119th Congress ==
=== House ===
==== Co-Chairs ====
- Henry Cuellar (D-TX)
- David Joyce (R-OH)
- Betty McCollum (D-MN)
- Guy Reschenthaler (R-PA)

==== Members ====
- Robert Aderholt (R-AL)
- Jim Baird (R-IN)
- Karen Bass (D-CA) retiring at end of 117th Congress.
- Stephanie Bice (R-OK)
- Sanford Bishop (D-GA)
- Earl Blumenauer (D-OR)
- Kevin Brady (R-TX) retiring at end of 117th Congress.
- Vern Buchanan (R-FL)
- G. K. Butterfield (D-NC) retiring at end of 117th Congress.
- Ken Calvert (R-CA)
- André Carson (D-IN)
- Buddy Carter (R-GA)
- John Carter (R-TX)
- Matt Cartwright (D-PA)
- Ben Cline (R-VA)
- James Clyburn (D-SC)
- Steve Cohen (D-TN)
- Jim Costa (D-CA)
- Peter DeFazio (D-OR) retiring at end of 117th Congress.
- Ted Deutch (D-FL) retiring at end of 117th Congress.
- Lloyd Doggett (D-TX)
- Jeff Duncan (R-SC)
- Chuck Fleischmann (R-TN)
- Lois Frankel (D-FL)
- John Garamendi (D-CA)
- Louie Gohmert (R-TX) retiring at end of 117th Congress.
- Lance Gooden (R-TX)
- Kay Granger (R-TX)
- Garret Graves (R-LA)
- Morgan Griffith (R-VA)
- Vicky Hartzler (R-MO) retiring at end of 117th Congress.
- French Hill (R-AR)
- Sheila Jackson Lee (D-TX)
- Derek Kilmer (D-WA)
- Young Kim (R-CA)
- Ron Kind (D-WI) retiring at end of 117th Congress.
- Adam Kinzinger (R-IL) retiring at end of 117th Congress.
- Darin LaHood (R-IL)
- Doug Lamborn (R-CO)
- John Larson (D-CT)
- Barbara Lee (D-CA)
- Alan Lowenthal (D-CA) retiring at end of 117th Congress.
- Carolyn Maloney (D-NY)
- Michael McCaul (R-TX)
- Tom McClintock (R-CA)
- David McKinley (R-WV) lost renomination in 2022 due to redistricting.
- Greg Murphy (R-NC)
- Jerry McNerney (D-CA) retiring at end of 117th Congress.
- Gregory Meeks (D-NY)
- Grace Napolitano (D-CA)
- Dan Newhouse (R-WA)
- Frank Pallone (D-NJ)
- Jimmy Panetta (D-CA)
- Donald Payne Jr. (D-NJ)
- Scott Peters (D-CA)
- Chellie Pingree (D-ME)
- Bill Posey (R-FL)
- David Price (D-NC) retiring at end of 117th Congress.
- Mike Quigley (D-IL)
- Tom Rice (R-SC) lost renomination in 2022.
- Hal Rogers (R-KY)
- Mike Rogers (R-AL)
- John Rutherford (R-FL)
- Tim Ryan (D-OH) retiring at end of 117th Congress.
- Gregorio Sablan (D-MP)
- Linda Sánchez (D-CA)
- John Sarbanes (D-MD)
- Austin Scott (R-GA)
- Mike Simpson (R-ID)
- Adam Smith (D-WA)
- Chris Smith (R-NJ)
- Chris Stewart (R-UT)
- Pete Stauber (R-MN)
- Bryan Steil (R-WI)
- Chris Stewart (R-UT)
- Mark Takano (D-CA)
- Dina Titus (D-NV)
- Mike Turner (R-OH)
- Fred Upton (R-MI) retiring at end of 117th Congress.
- Debbie Wasserman Schultz (D-FL)
- Joe Wilson (R-SC)
- Bruce Westerman (R-AR)
- Joe Wilson (R-SC)
- Rob Wittman (R-VA)
- Steve Womack (R-AR)

=== Senate ===
==== Co-Chairs ====
- John Boozman (R-AR)
- Chris Coons (D-DE)
- Martin Heinrich (D-NM)
- Thom Tillis (R-NC)

==== Members ====
- John Barrasso (R-WY)
- Tammy Baldwin (D-WI)
- Michael Bennet (D-CO)
- Marsha Blackburn (R-TN)
- Roy Blunt (R-MO) retiring at end of 117th Congress.
- John Boozman (R-AR)
- Mike Braun (R-IN)
- Tom Carper (D-DE)
- Bill Cassidy (R-LA)
- Tom Cotton (R-AR)
- Mike Crapo (R-ID)
- Steve Daines (R-MT)
- Dick Durbin (D-IL)
- Kirsten Gillibrand (D-NY)
- Lindsey Graham (R-SC)
- Martin Heinrich (D-NM)
- James Inhofe (R-OK) resigning at end of 117th Congress.
- Amy Klobuchar (D-MN)
- Edward Markey (D-MA)
- Robert Menendez (D-NJ)
- Jerry Moran (R-KS)
- James Risch (R-ID)
- Brian Schatz (D-HI)
- Debbie Stabenow (D-MI)
- Jon Tester (D-MT)
- John Thune (R-SD)
- Tommy Tuberville (R-AL)
- Chris Van Hollen (D-MD)
- Roger Wicker (R-MS)
- Ron Wyden (D-OR)

=== Former co-chairs ===
==== Former House Chairs ====
- Ben Chandler (D-KY)
- Ander Crenshaw (R-FL)
- Norm Dicks (D-WA)
- Hal Rogers (R-KY)
- Clay Shaw (R-FL)(ret.)
- John Tanner (D-TN)
- Jim Moran (D-VA)

==== Former Senate Chairs ====
- Sam Brownback (R-KS)
- Richard Burr (R-NC)
- Dick Durbin (D-IL)
- Robert Portman (R-OH)
- Olympia Snowe (R-ME)
- Tom Udall (D-NM)
- Sheldon Whitehouse (D-RI)
- Rob Portman (R-OH)

== See also ==
- Conservation in the United States
- International Conservation Caucus Foundation
