= Committee on Natural Resources =

Committee on Natural Resources may refer to:

- Philippine House Committee on Natural Resources, a committee of the House of Representatives of the Philippines
- United States House Committee on Natural Resources, a committee of the U.S. House of Representatives

== See also ==
- United States Senate Committee on Energy and Natural Resources, a committee of the U.S. Senate
- Department of Natural Resources (disambiguation)
