= The Evolution of the Conservation Movement, 1850–1920 =

Online exhibition from the Library of Congress

The Evolution of the Conservation Movement, 1850–1920 is an online exhibition from the Library of Congress' American Memory series. It documents the historical formation and cultural foundations of the movement to conserve and protect America's natural heritage, through books, pamphlets, government documents, manuscripts, prints, photographs, and motion picture footage drawn from the collections of the Library of Congress.

The collection consists of 62 books and pamphlets, 140 Federal statutes and Congressional resolutions, 34 additional legislative documents, excerpts from the Congressional Globe and the Congressional Record, 360 Presidential proclamations, 170 prints and photographs, 2 historic manuscripts, and 2 motion pictures.

== See also ==
- Conservation in the United States
