= Department of Natural Resources (disambiguation) =

Many sub-national governments have a Department of Natural Resources or similarly named organization, often charged with managing wildlife conservation and publicly-owned conservation and recreation areas.

== Australia ==
- Department of National Resources (Australia), an Australian Government department that existed between 1975 and 1977

== Canada ==
- Several departments of Natural Resources Canada

== United States ==
- Alabama Department of Conservation and Natural Resources
- Alaska Department of Natural Resources
- Colorado Department of Natural Resources
- Delaware Department of Natural Resources and Environmental Control
- Georgia Department of Natural Resources
- Hawai'i Department of Land and Natural Resources
- Illinois Department of Natural Resources
- Indiana Department of Natural Resources
- Iowa Department of Natural Resources
- Maryland Department of Natural Resources
- Michigan Department of Natural Resources
- Minnesota Department of Natural Resources
- Missouri Department of Natural Resources
- North Carolina Department of Environment and Natural Resources
- Ohio Department of Natural Resources
- Pennsylvania Department of Conservation and Natural Resources
- Puerto Rico Department of Natural and Environmental Resources
- South Carolina Department of Natural Resources
- South Dakota Department of Game, Fish, and Parks
- Washington Department of Natural Resources
- West Virginia Division of Natural Resources
- Wisconsin Department of Natural Resources

== See also ==
- Committee on Natural Resources (disambiguation)
- Ministry of Natural Resources (disambiguation)
- Department of Environmental Management (disambiguation)
- Department of Environmental Protection (disambiguation)
- List of health and environmental agencies in the United States
- List of environmental ministries
