= North American Game Warden Museum =

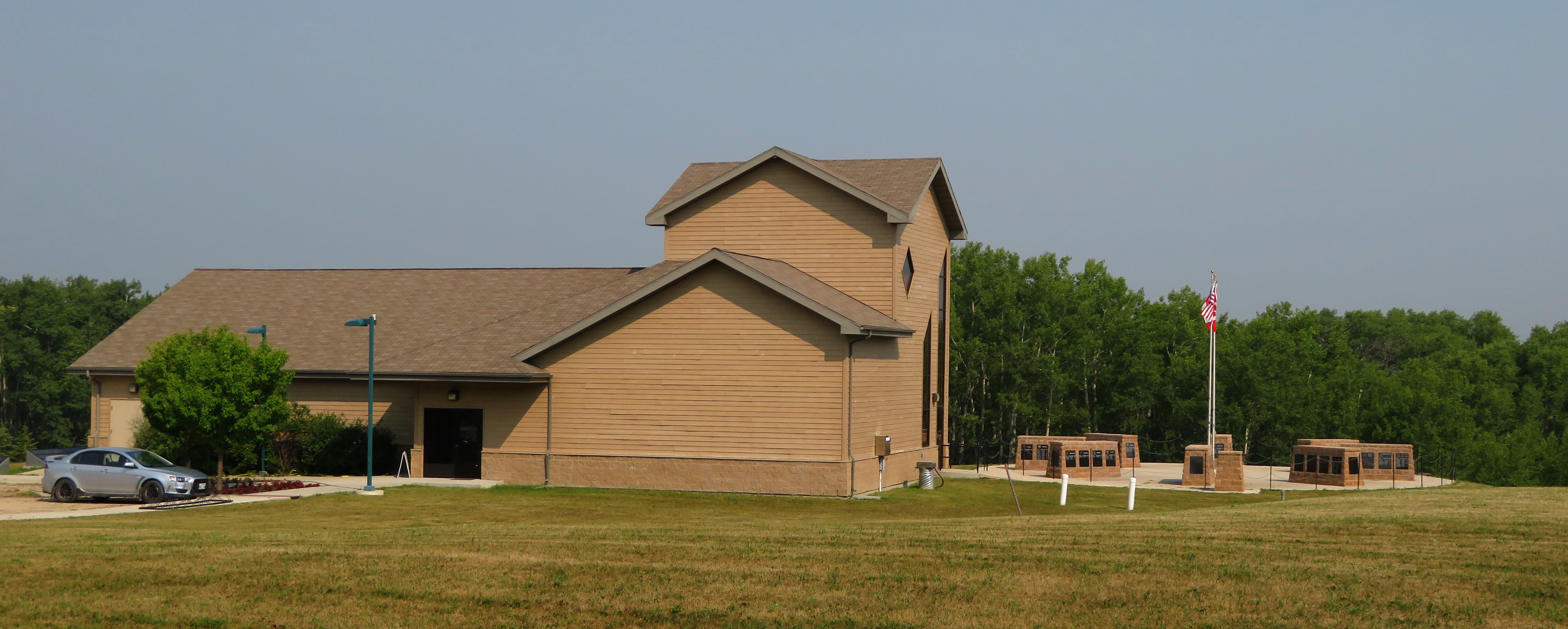

- Location of North American Game Warden Museum
- Established: 1994
- Location: North Dakota section of the International Peace Garden
- Coordinates: 48.994514°N 100.072248°W
- Website: gamewardenmuseum.org

The North American Game Warden Museum is a museum in the International Peace Garden on the Canada–United States international border between the Canadian province of Manitoba and the U.S. state of North Dakota. The museum is located on the American side of the border. Initially founded on a temporary basis at the International Peace Garden in the 1990s, it became a permanent museum in 2005.

The museum is sponsored by the North American Wildlife Enforcement Officers Association and aims to raise the professional profile and celebrate the work of game wardens and conservation officers. This museum's states on its website that its purpose is to "honor these heroes and educate the public about their work and the natural resources they protect."

== History ==
This museum has been located at the International Peace Garden since its inception. Founded on a temporary basis in the 1990s, the permanent museum opened in 2005 at the same location "for its natural beauty, central North American location and recognition as an international tourism destination."

== Purpose ==
Its underlying purpose is to raise the professional profile and celebrate the work of game wardens and their colleagues, conservation officers. The name each group of professionals goes by depends on their governmental jurisdiction; for example, in Michigan the title "conservation officer" is used.

This museum's management has set forth a fourfold mission statement:

1. protecting "the wild" in an overcrowded, polluted and too-civilized planet, so that "natural gifts" are preserved for future generations through legal enforcement and public education;
2. recognizing the important and dangerous role of game wardens who often work alone in desolate and remote locations, facing armed foes;
3. honoring and memorializing fallen heroes and other officers, who work in a largely unsung role, thereby helping their morale, and
4. educating the public about the work and mission of conservation officers, thereby increasing support for their efforts.

73 Game Wardens/Protectors/Conservation Officers are listed on The Officer Down Memorial Page.

== Recognizing the wardens' roles ==
The museum emphasizes the multifaceted nature of the game warden's role.

Confronting armed poachers in rural and even remote locations can be lonely, dangerous and even fatal work for game wardens. Recognition of the ultimate sacrifice of these officers at this museum is considered to be important, concomitant to recognition at the National Law Enforcement Officers Memorial.

Officers are exposed to other risks beyond being killed by hunters, trappers and armed fishermen. Heart attacks, motor vehicle, boating, snowmobile and airplane accidents, animal attacks, drowning, hypothermia, etc. also take their toll while on duty.

In North America game wardens are typically employees of state or provincial governments. 26 of the 50 U.S. states have government departments entitled Department of Natural Resources or a similar title. These departments typically patrol state or provincial parks and public lands and waterways dedicated to hunting and fishing, and also enforce state or provincial game and environmental laws on private property.

Game wardens/conservation officers are front and center in keeping out (or in check) invasive species.

In an increasingly interconnected and globalized world, their concerns are much more comprehensive than local enforcement. They also enforce broader conservation laws, such as the Endangered Species Act, the Migratory Bird Treaty Act of 1918 and similar laws/treaties. or the Wild Animal and Plant Protection and Regulation of International and Interprovincial Trade Act (in Canada) which implements the Convention on the International Trade in Endangered Species of Wild Flora and Fauna (CITES). As necessary, they will work in tandem with appropriate national or federal agencies, such as the U.S. Fish and Wildlife Service or Environment Canada.

== See also ==
- Department of Natural Resources (disambiguation)
- Environment Canada
- Environmental Protection Agency
- National Law Enforcement Officers Memorial in Washington, D.C.
- U.S. Fish and Wildlife Service
