= Michigan Conservation Officers =

Michigan Department Of Natural Resources Law Enforcement Division
- Common name: Law Enforcement Division
- Abbreviation: LED

Agency overview
- Formed: 1887
- Employees: 239
- Annual budget: $42,435,200 (2019)

Jurisdictional structure
- Operations jurisdiction: Michigan, US
- Area: 97,990 square miles (253,800 km^{2})
- Population: 10,077,331 (2020 est.)
- General nature: Civilian police

Operational structure
- Headquarters: Lansing, Michigan
- Peace Officer Conservation Officers: 219
- Agency executive: Jason Haines, Chief
- Parent agency: Michigan Department of Natural Resources
- Districts: 9

Website
- https://www.michigan.gov/dnr/managing-resources/laws/co

Michigan Conservation Officers also known as Michigan DNR Law Enforcement Division are conservation officers who are the enforcement branch of the Michigan Department of Natural Resources. Their primary duty is to enforce the environmental laws in the State of Michigan. Michigan Conservation Officers are fully commissioned peace officers and are empowered to enforce all the laws of the State of Michigan.

The Michigan Conservation Officers work with local police departments, sheriff's departments, the Michigan State Police, the U.S. Coast Guard, the U.S. Customs and Border Protection, the U.S. Forest Service Law Enforcement Division, the United States Fish and Wildlife Service and other state, federal, and foreign agencies including the Ontario Conservation Officers.

== History ==
Early Michiganders recognized the rich and vast natural treasures surrounding them and the need for their conservation and protection. The result was the first salaried U.S. game warden, William Alden Smith, who was appointed in 1887.

Warden Smith was charged principally with appointing deputies for the enforcement of fish and game regulations. The mission of the DNR Law Enforcement Division has expanded substantially since Smith's appointment and now includes protection of all natural resources and the environment, as well as the health and safety of the public.

Today, "Conservation Officers" and other noncommissioned support staff direct their efforts to a wide array of responsibilities designed to support this broad mission. Enforcement, Education, Recreational Safety and Public Outreach represent some of the general categories of services.

== Department Overview ==
=== Structure ===
Michigan Conservation Officers fall under the Law Enforcement Division of the Michigan Department of Natural Resources. Some states including Oregon and Alaska include environmental law enforcement under the Department of State Police. This allows resources to be combined and saves the states money by eliminating duplicate services. Combining the two departments also has some disadvantages. Most states don't combine the two departments. The Law Enforcement Division is broken down into a number of subsections. The subsections include:

- Field Operations
- Environmental Investigations
- Emergency Management
- Great Lakes Enforcement Unit (GLEU)
- Special Investigations Unit (SIU)
- Recreational Safety Programs
- Employment, Training, & Legal

(Note, Wildlife Resource Protection unit became individual Investigative Unit [SIU] and Commercial Fish unit [GLEU])

=== Personnel ===
The Law Enforcement Division of the Michigan Department of Natural Resources has approximately 250 officers.

They are represented in collective bargaining by a union, the Michigan State Employees Association. The last time the Law Enforcement Division (LED) of the Michigan Department of Natural Resources held a recruit academy was 2018. The academy concluded December 2018. At that time they added 24 new conservation officers.

=== Rank structure ===
Title	Insignia
Chief	
Assistant Chief	
Captain	
1st Lieutenant	
2nd Lieutenant	
Sergeant	
Detective	
Corporal	
Officer	
Recruit	

(Note, Detective and Corporal are the same payscale,)

=== Budget ===
Fiscal Year	DNR Budget	Law Enforcement Budget	Pct. of DNR Budget
2008–2009	289,400,000.00	34,728,000.00	12%
2009–2010	282,300,000.00	28,230,000.00	10%
2010-2011	300,900,000.00	30,090,000.00	10%
2011-2012	304,300,000.00	30,430,000.00	10%
2012-2013	321,100,000.00	32,100,000.00	10%
2013-2014	328,573,300.00	34,387,200.00	11%
2014-2015	356,121,000.00	35,612,000.00	10%
2015-2016	404,000,000.00	40,400,000.00	10%
2016-2017			
2017-2018			
2018-2019			

=== Transportation ===
Michigan conservation officers use the Chevrolet Silverado and Chevrolet Tahoe as patrol vehicles. They also use patrol boats, both motorized and human-powered, that range in size when they patrol the Great Lakes, inland lakes, rivers, and streams. Other vehicles used include snowmobiles and All Terrain Vehicles (ATVs).

=== Fallen Officers ===
From 1908 to date the Michigan Conservation Officers have lost 13 officers in the line of duty. The sacrifice of these officers are customarily recognized on the National Law Enforcement Officers Memorial or at North American Game Warden Museum on the Jurisdictional Plaque. There are also individual memorials scattered around the state.

=== Training ===
In January 2014 the MDNR Law Enforcement Division commenced its first academy since 2007 with 31 recruits. This ended a nearly 7-year gap in recruit schools. During the gap, caused by budgetary issues, once an individual was selected for the position of Conservation Officer and the individual was not certified by MCOLES the MDNR paid the individual to complete the required MCOLES Academy. They then would complete the MDNR Environmental Law Enforcement courses. If the individual was MCOLES certified the individual would go through training courses focusing on Environmental Law Enforcement.

Once selected by the Department of Natural Resources through a rigorous selection process the recruits go through an intense 22-week live in training period. The live-in training is held at the Michigan State Police training facility in Lansing. Once completed, the recruits are then fully commissioned conservation officers. After the training, the new officers will be assigned a field-training officer for 18 weeks at a variety of locations around the state. Once the probation period is completed, the officers will be assigned to one of the 83 counties in Michigan. Michigan Conservation Officers are certified by the Michigan Commission on Law Enforcement Standards or MCOLES.

=== Other ===
MDNR Report All Poaching Hotline RAP 1-800-292-7800

== See also ==
- Michigan Department of Natural Resources
