= Department of Environmental Management (disambiguation) =

Department of Environmental Management may refer to one of environmental agencies in sub-national governments of United States:

- Alabama Department of Environmental Management
- Indiana Department of Environmental Management
- Massachusetts Department of Environmental Management, now part of the Department of Conservation and Recreation (Massachusetts)
- Rhode Island Department of Environmental Management

== See also ==
- Department of Environmental Protection (disambiguation)
- Department of Natural Resources (disambiguation)
