= Ministry of Natural Resources =

Ministry of Natural Resources may refer to:

- Minister of Natural Resources (Canada)
- Ministry of Natural Resources (China)
- Ministry of Natural Resources (Ontario)
- Ministry of Natural Resources (Somalia)
- Ministry of Natural Resources and Environment (Russia)
- Ministry of Natural Resources and Environment (Thailand)
- Ministry of Natural Resources and Wildlife (Quebec)
- Ministry of Natural Resources and Tourism (Tanzania)
- Ministry of Natural Resources and Environment (Malaysia)
- Ministry for the Environment and Natural Resources (Iceland)
- Ministry of Ecology and Natural Resources (Azerbaijan)
- Ministry of Energy and Natural Resources (Georgia)
- Ministry of Energy and Natural Resources (Turkey)
- Ministry of Environment Protection and Natural Resources (Georgia)
- Ministry of the Environment and Natural Resources (Nicaragua)
- Rivers State Ministry of Energy and Natural Resources
- Venezuelan Ministry of Environment and Natural Resources

== See also ==
- List of environmental ministries
