= Michigan Department of Natural Resources =

Government agency of Michigan

Department of Natural Resources

Department overview
- Formed: 1887
- Headquarters: Deborah A. Stabenow Building P.O. Box 30028 Lansing, Michigan 48909
- Employees: 1,400 Permanent; 1,600 seasonal
- Annual budget: $307.4 million (2010)
- Department executive: Scott Bowen, Director
- Child agencies: Mackinac Island State Park Commission; Michigan History Museum
- Website: michigan.gov/dnr

The Michigan Department of Natural Resources (DNR) is the agency of the state of Michigan founded in 1921, charged with maintaining natural resources such as state parks, state forests, and recreation areas. It is governed by a director appointed by the Governor and accepted by the Natural Resources Commission. Since 2023, the Director is Scott Bowen. The DNR has about 1,400 permanent employees, and over 1,600 seasonal employees.

== History ==
In 1887, the Michigan Legislature created the salaried position of state game warden. The position, which was initially created to oversee market hunting and the supply of essential foodstuffs to local lumber camps, was the direct ancestor of the state's conservation infrastructure. In 1921, the Michigan Legislature created the Department of Conservation and a Conservation Commission to manage the state's natural resources. The first director of the department was John Baird.

The Michigan Department of Natural Resources was created in 1965 as a part of the constitutionally required reorganization of the executive branch via Executive Organization Act of 1965. Under Governor John Engler, the Michigan Department of Environmental Quality was formed from the department's environmental regulation functions, and the appointment of the department's commission chair was transferred to the governor. Several DNR boards and commissions were also abolished with their powers transferred to the department director.

=== 21st century ===
In 2009, Governor Jennifer Granholm moved to merge the Michigan Department of Environmental Quality back into the Michigan Department of Natural Resources and appoint the reunited department's director instead of the Natural Resources Commission. The state merged the two agencies to form the Department of Natural Resources and Environment.

In 2010, however, Governor elect Rick Snyder named Rodney Stokes as the new Department of Natural Resources director, and chose to divide the Department of Natural Resources and Environment into the original designations of Natural Resource Commission and the DNR divisions. Rodney Stokes said his first priority was to reverse the decline of hunting in Michigan, by eliminating the extended seasons, reducing the amount of antlerless licenses in Northern Michigan, improving habitat and removing license requirements for coyote and wolf. On January 4, 2011, Governor Rick Snyder issued Executive Order 2011–1, which eliminated the Department of Natural Resources and Environment (DNRE) and created the Department of Natural Resources (DNR) and the Department of Environmental Quality (DEQ).

=== Directors ===
Director	Tenure	Governor(s)
John Baird	1921–1926	Groesbeck
Leigh Young	January 1927 – October 1927	Green
George R. Hogarth	October 1927 – October 1934	Green/Brucker/Comstock
P. J. Hoffmaster	October 1934 – March 1951	Comstock/Fitzgerald/Murphy/Dickinson/ Van Wagoner/Kelly/Sigler/Williams
Gerald E. Eddy	April 1951 – April 1964	Williams/Swainson/Romney
Ralph A. MacMullan	May 1964 – September 1972	Romney/Milliken
A. Gene Gazlay	October 1972 – June 1974	Milliken
Dave Jenkins*	July 1974 – December 1974	Milliken
Howard A. Tanner	January 1975 – June 1983	Milliken/Blanchard
James Cleary*	June 1983 – August 1983	Blanchard
Ronald O. Skoog	September 1983 – June 1986	Blanchard
Gordon Guyer	July 1986 – May 1988	Blanchard
David F. Hales	May 1988 – May 1991	Blanchard/Engler
Delbert Rector**	May 1991 – September 1991	Engler
Rollie Harmes	September 1991 – October 1995	Engler
Michael D. Moore	October 1995 – March 1996	Engler
K.L. Cool	April 1996 – May 2004	Engler/Granholm
Rebecca A. Humphries	May 2004 – January 2011	Granholm
Rodney Stokes	January 2011 – July 2012	Snyder
Keith Creagh	July 2012 – December 2018	Snyder
Dan Eichinger	January 2019 – December 2022	Whitmer
Shannon Lott*	January 2023 – September 2023	Whitmer
Scott Bowen	September 2023 – present	Whitmer

* - denotes acting director
** - denotes interim director

== Mission statement ==
"The Michigan Department of Natural Resources is committed to the conservation, protection, management, use and enjoyment of the State's natural resources for current and future generations."

== Funding, budget ==
The DNR is funded by the state general fund revenues, federal funds and a variety of restricted funds. Federal funding consists mainly of special purpose categorical grants from various Federal agencies, such as the U.S. Department of the Interior and U.S. Department of Agriculture. Restricted funding is generated from licenses, user fees and other charges. These funds support programs for wildlife and fisheries programs, operation of Michigan state parks, harbor development, marine safety enforcement and education, snowmobile and off-road vehicle (ORV) trail repair and development, and operation of Michigan's 150 state forest campgrounds. Restricted revenues, which by statute can only be used to support related programs, are generated from hunting and fishing license, state park entrance and camping fees, two percent of the gas tax, snowmobile registration and snowmobile trail and ORV permits and forest camping fees.

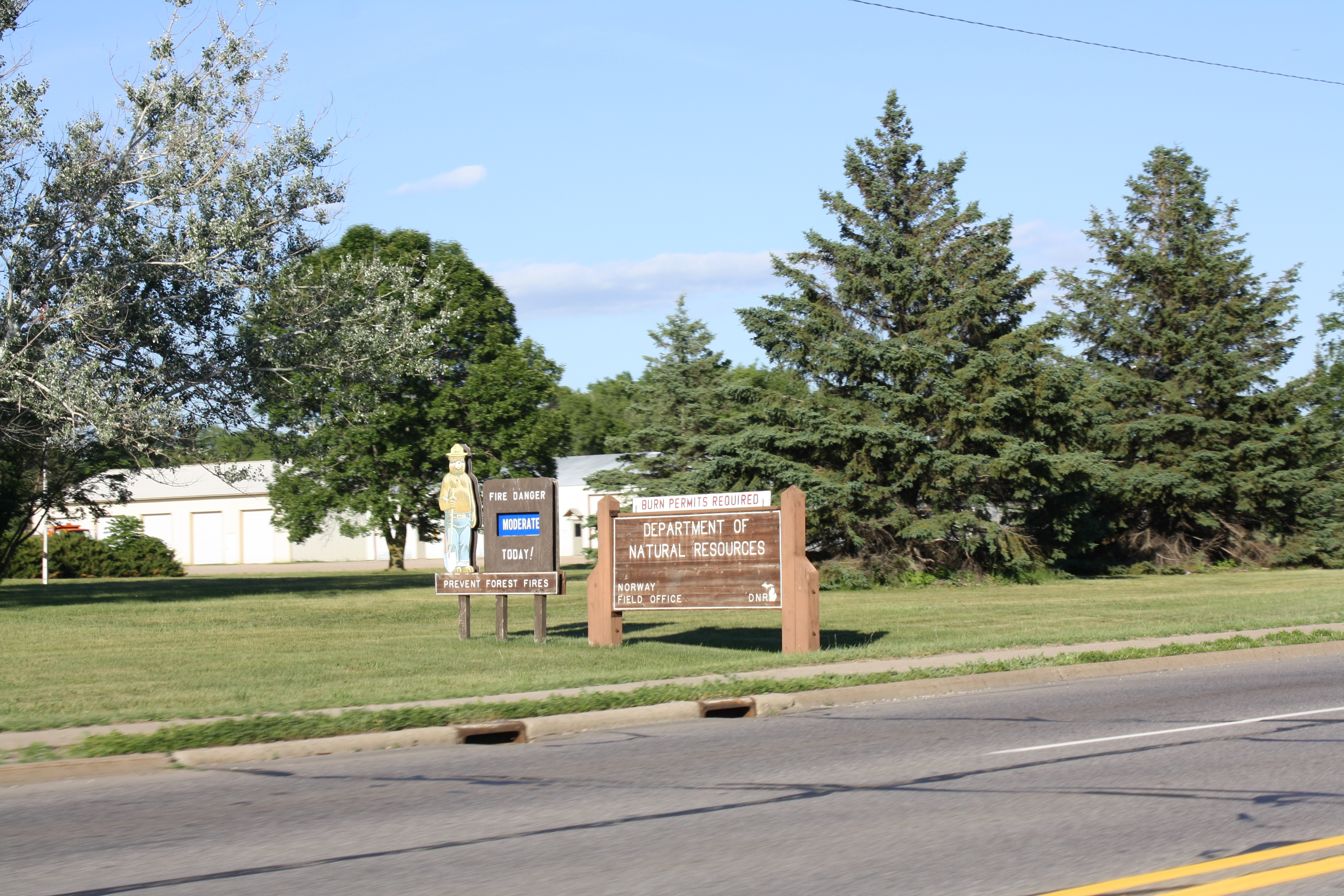
Norway location

== Commissions and boards ==
=== Natural Resources Commission ===
The Michigan Natural Resources Commission (NRC) is a seven-member public body whose members are appointed by the governor to a term of four years and subject to the advice and consent of the Michigan Senate. The NRC conducts monthly, public meetings in locations throughout Michigan. Citizens are encouraged to become actively involved in these public forums. The NRC establishes general policies for the Department of Natural Resources and hires the department's director. Voter adoption of Proposal G in November 1996, vests exclusive authority in the Natural Resources Commission to regulate the taking of game.

=== Waterways Commission ===
The Michigan State Waterways Commission is responsible for the acquisition, construction, and maintenance of recreational harbors, channels, docking and launching facilities, and administration of commercial docks in the Straits of Mackinac. Commission members are appointed by the Governor, with the advice and consent of the Michigan Senate, to serve three-year terms. Upon expiration of a term, a member may continue to serve until re-appointed or a successor is appointed.

=== Natural Resources Trust Fund Board ===
The Michigan Natural Resources Trust Fund (MNRTF) has been in place since 1976 and provides financial assistance to local governments and the Department of Natural Resources to purchase land or rights in land for public recreation. It also assists in the appropriate development of land for public outdoor recreation. The MNRTF is supported by annual revenues from the development of State-owned mineral resources, largely oil and gas. The program is administered by the MNRTF Board of Trustees and the Grants Management office of the DNR. The MNRTF Board of Trustees meets six times a year and all meetings are open to the public. MNRTF projects provide for natural resource protection and outdoor recreation.

=== Mackinac Island State Park Commission ===
The Mackinac Island State Park Commission is an appointed board of the State of Michigan that administers state parklands in the Straits of Mackinac area. It performs public activities under the name Mackinac State Historic Parks. Park units include Mackinac Island State Park including Fort Mackinac and certain properties within the historic downtown of Mackinac Island, Michigan; Colonial Michilimackinac including Fort Michilimackinac and Old Mackinac Point Lighthouse; and the Dousman's Mill Historic Site. It is assigned to the Michigan Department of Natural Resources.

== Divisions ==
=== Fisheries ===
The Fisheries Division works to preserve and enhance Michigan's fish populations, as well as other forms of aquatic life. This is done through monitoring and studying by biologists specialized in the field of fisheries science. The Fisheries Division is organized into four Sections; Administration, Fisheries Management, Research, and Fish Production. The size of the Fisheries Division fluctuates with funding but presently is about 165 full-time employees. The number of employees are spread approximately evenly across the four Sections. The Fish Production Section includes six fish hatcheries located throughout the state with the sole purpose of maintaining or improving fish populations. As many as 20 species of fish are annually reared and stocked. Fisheries Management is principally conducted by biologists from various management units that form Basin Teams. There is one Basin Team for each of the Great Lakes watersheds that Michigan has jurisdiction for (Superior, Michigan, Huron and Erie). The Basin Teams include representation from the Fish Production and Research Sections as well. The Research Section is organized as five stations, one on each Great Lake and one inland station called the Institute of Fisheries Research located on the campus of the University of Michigan. The Research Section includes fisheries biologists that specialize in stock assessment and conduct surveys of the Great Lakes and develop computer models with the intent of advising the fishery managers and administration. Included are research vessels on each Great Lakes assigned to each of the Research Station except the inland Institute for Fisheries Research. The vessels include the; R/V Steelhead, R/V Char, R/V Tanner, and the R/V Channel Cat. On the Great Lakes, states hold the fishery management authority sometimes shared with some Native American Tribes. The Fisheries Division of the Michigan DNR participates in coordinated management of the Great Lakes fishery resources through the Great Lakes Fishery Commission. The Fisheries Division is funded principally by fishing licenses sales revenue, federal aid in the form of Sport Fish Restoration funds (AKA 'DJ' Funds), and some grants. The Fisheries Division occasionally is the recipient of general fund tax dollars for specific capital development needs but does not normally subsist off of state tax dollars.

=== Forest Resources Division (FRD) ===
The Forest Resources Division administers around 4,000,000 acres of state forest land, managing it for objectives such as timber production, recreation, and wildlife habitat. The FRD maintains statewide aerial photographs in color infra-red and black and white formats, and provides detailed computerized map information for land utilization, management and resource protection. In the field, the division is responsible for the management of all aspects of the state forests, except for State Forest Recreation (Such as State Forest Campgrounds and trails). The Parks and Recreation Division took over the recreation responsibilities in January 2012. The FR Division manages the use of forests for timber production, new tree growth, and wildlife habitat. The FR Division mainly consists of Foresters who regularly examine trees, plants and soil characteristics to determine the best management practices to keep the forests healthy and Fire Officers which protect both public and private lands from wildfires. The FR division consists of about 270 employees, including foresters, technicians, fire officers and other specialists. Most FR staff works out of DNR field offices, mainly in the Upper Peninsula and Northern/Central Lower Peninsula.

=== Law enforcement ===
Michigan Conservation Officers, often referred to as "COs", are fully commissioned peace officers that are employed by the DNR and are empowered to enforce all laws of the state of Michigan, with emphasis on hunting and fishing regulations. COs have full police powers in the state of Michigan, though COs can only issue traffic violations if ancillary to a conservation or state law violation as well as for poaching. COs also work with other state, federal and local law-enforcement agencies to enforce a wide range of statutes and assist in undercover investigations, fire prevention and emergency search, rescue and recovery operations. Conservation Officers are often the first person to locate lost hunters and provide emergency medical assistance to those in need. They also play an important role in the department's educational public outreach efforts with organizations and clubs, community groups and schools. Conservation Officers frequently help establish and serve as instructors of recreational safety programs for hunters, boaters and operators of recreational vehicles.

=== Wildlife ===
The Wildlife Division manages and protects nearly 400 species of game and nongame birds, mammals and their habitats, along with over 70 state game and wildlife areas. Recommendations on hunting regulations, habitat management, public hunting access are made by Wildlife Biologists who also help protect more than 340 threatened and endangered plant and animal species. Michigan's high number of registered hunters contribute $2 billion annually to Michigan's economy, excluding license fees. Through the sale of specialty license plates and donations, the Wildlife Division contributes to the Nongame Wildlife Fund which supports Natural Heritage research, education and habitat restoration projects to identify, protect, manage and restore native plant and animal species.

=== Parks and recreation ===
The DNR Parks and Recreation Division (PRD) is the largest division, by far, in the Michigan DNR with about 550 division employees (Including career Seasonal Park Rangers). It manages all 103 state parks and recreation areas, 829 developed boating access sites, 10 lighthouses, 16 harbors and six scenic sites. State park lands help to protect and preserve the biological and historical diversity of Michigan. More than 200 rare species of plants and animals are located on park lands. The Parks and Recreation Division also maintains 130 State Forest Campgrounds, and ORV and Snowmobile trails. The Parks & Recreation Division is a self-supporting system which means management of the lands are supported by user fees such as: Recreation Passport, camping fees, boat registrations, harbor slip rentals and marine fuel sales. The generous support of volunteers like campground hosts, helps to maintain these recreation facilities for all to enjoy. The Parks & Recreation Division consists primarily of seasonal and full-time (career) Park Rangers or Managers who perform maintenance and law enforcement within each park, with the help of summer (non-career) workers. Most Parks and Recreation Division staff work out of state park headquarters (similar to field offices) while others work out of field offices or district headquarters. State park headquarters don't only serve as an office for the state park, but also for local state forest campgrounds, boating access sites, trails, and other DNR owned sites.

Michigan DNR Parks Chiefs/Superintendents:

PJ Hoffmaster 1919-1934 Walter J. Kingscott 1919-1934 Arthur Elmer 1946-1966 Robert Dodge 1966-1976 Jack Butterfield 1976-1990 Russ Harding 1990-1992 (Michael) Dan Moore 1993 OJ Scherschligt 1993-1995 Rodney Stokes 1996-2003 Lowen Schuett*(acting) 2004 Ronald A. Olson 2005-2025 Kristen Kosick 2025-2026 Tom Bissett 2026 - present.

=== Land and facilities ===
The Land and Facilities Division assists with the overall administration of approximately 4,500,000 acres (18,000 km^{2}) of publicly owned lands, 25,000,000 acres (100,000 km^{2}) of Great Lakes bottomlands and 130,000 platted lots under the jurisdiction of the DNR. This includes land ownership records on all department land transactions, activities related to the acquisition and disposition of land or rights in land, and resolves title and boundary issues. Land and Facilities Division also deals with and department purchases, gifts, exchanges, sales, and easement transactions. This division also provides design and construction services for the department and provides administrative and facility operational support to program staff located at DNR Operations Service Centers and other field offices.

=== Administration ===
The importance of utilizing customer-friendly service technologies, sound accounting principles and best business practices, proper contract administration and educational outreach efforts in the management of Michigan's natural resources cannot be overstated. DNR's Financial Services; Budget and Support Services; Grants, Contracts and Customer Systems; Program Assistance and Review; and Human Resources, all play vital roles in supporting the department's conservation mission.

== DNR law academies and orientation ==
Annually the DNR will hold two law academies focused on training new officers. The first academy is for all newly hired Michigan Conservation Officers and consists of training in Precision Driving, Legal Issues, Watercraft, Search & Seizure, Snowmobiles, Survival Tactics, Off Road Vehicles, Use of Force, Firearms, Communication, Writing, Organization, Public Relations, Forensics, and Technology. The academy has strict Michigan Commission on Law Enforcement Standards (MCOLES) physical standards that each recruit must meet, and lasts 22 weeks. The second academy is for all newly hired Park Rangers and consists of mainly a classroom setting where each ranger becomes familiar with the laws governing the state parks. Additional emphasis is placed on survival tactics, report writing, handling abnormal people/complaints, and issuing appearance tickets. Michigan State Park Rangers are not sworn police officers and as such DO NOT carry a firearm, but are held to the same MCOLES physical standards as conservation officers. The duration of the academy is 7 weeks.

Every month the DNR holds a New Employee Orientation (NEO) in Lansing. The two-day seminar is designed to familiarize new employees with DNR work policies and networking opportunities.

== See also ==
- List of law enforcement agencies in Michigan
- List of state and territorial fish and wildlife management agencies in the United States
- Michigan State Land Office
