= Ontario Conservation Officers =

Ontario Ministry of Natural Resources and Forestry Conservation Officers
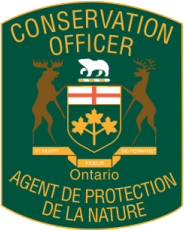
- Patch of Ontario Conservation Officers

Agency overview
- Formed: 1892
- Preceding agency: Ontario Board of Game and Fish
- Headquarters: 300 Water Street Peterborough, Ontario
- Parent agency: Ministry of Natural Resources and Forestry
- Website: https://www.ontario.ca/page/conservation-officer-powers-and-authorities

Map

Ontario Conservation Officers are the enforcement arm of the Ministry of Natural Resources and Forestry in Ontario, Canada. Conservation officers enforce provincial and federal laws related to natural resources, including fishing and hunting, and preventing forest fires.

Conservation officers (CO's) patrol the lakes, trails and back roads of Ontario to protect natural resources, and ensure public safety. They are professional, armed peace officers trained to police standards.

Conservation officers also spent time educating the public on conservation and safety, providing information on the regulations that protect species at risk, how to recognize and help prevent the spread of invasive species, prevention of forest fires, boating safety and how to prepare fish for transport, changes to fishing and hunting regulations and how to report known or suspected resource abuse to the Ministry of Natural Resources and Forestry TIPS violation reporting line at 1-877-847-7667.

Conservation officers enforce Ontario’s natural resources laws. They investigate and prosecute offenders under many federal and provincial statutes, relating to: fire, fish and wildlife, invasive species, forestry, aggregates (sand and gravel), public lands, public safety (e.g. recreational vehicle use, forest fire prevention) and Law enforcement.

Conservation officers are empowered to: stop and/or inspect a vehicle, boat or aircraft, inspect firearms, ammunition, fish or game, inspect buildings or other places, search with a warrant, and in circumstances requiring immediate action, without one, seize items related to an offence, ask questions relevant to the inspection and arrest anyone who has committed, is committing or is about to commit an offence under many of the acts they are authorized to enforce.
