= Department of Environment and Conservation =

Department of Environment and Conservation may refer to:

- Department of Environment and Conservation (Western Australia)
- Department of Environment and Conservation (Australia), an Australian Government Department that existed between 1972 and 1975.
- Tennessee Department of Environment and Conservation

== See also ==
- Department of Conservation (disambiguation)
