= Conservation officer =

Law enforcement officers responsible for protecting wildlife

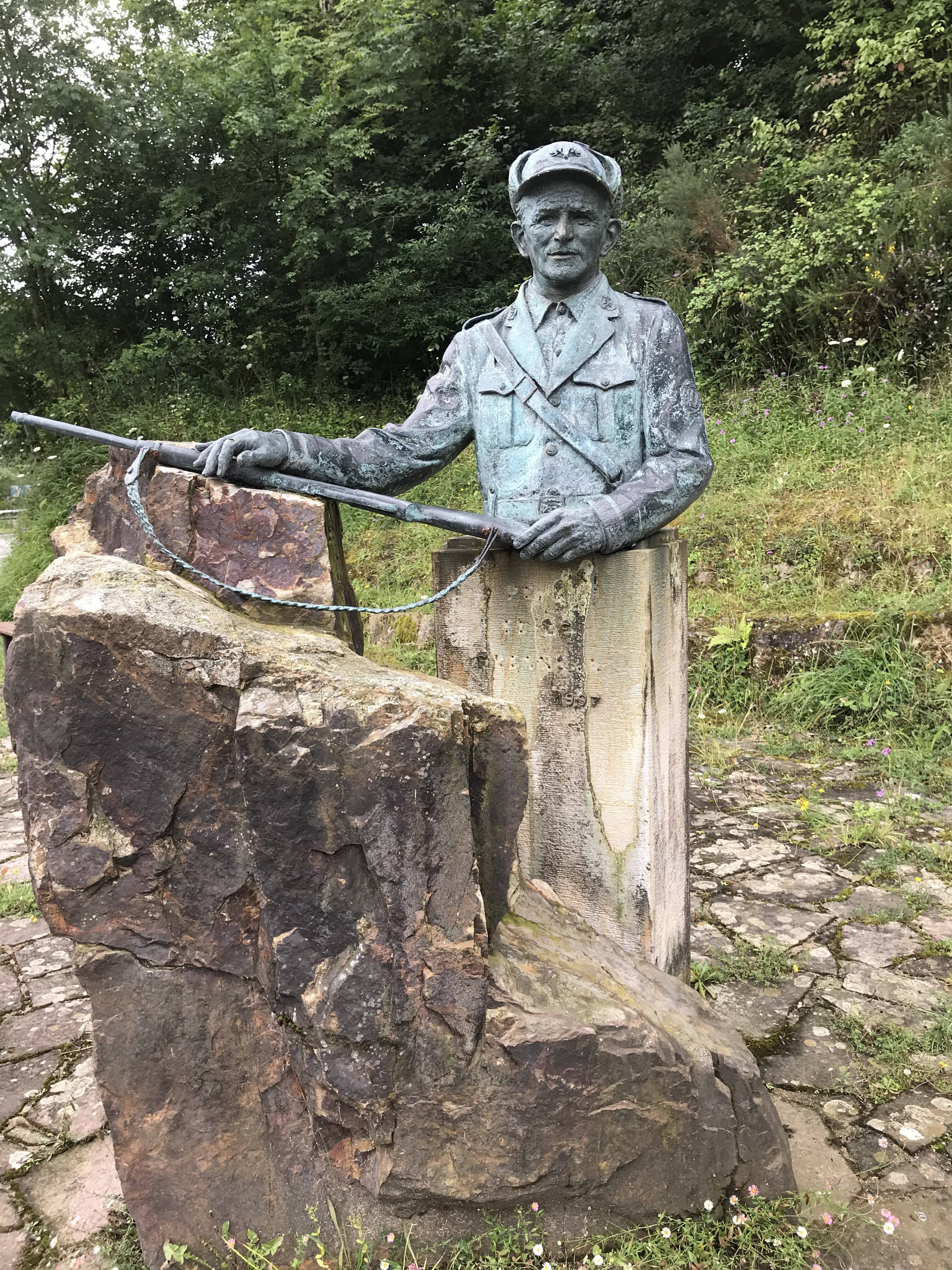
Bronze sculpture of Pepe el lobero (1909-1995), renowned head forest ranger of Saja-Besaya, Spain's most important hunting reserve

A conservation officer is a law enforcement officer who protects wildlife and the environment. A conservation officer may also be referred to as an environmental technician/technologist, game warden, park ranger, forest watcher, forest guard, forest warden, forester, gamekeeper, investigator, wilderness officer, wildlife officer, or wildlife trooper.

== History ==
Conservation officers can be traced back to the Middle Ages (see gamekeeper). Conservation law enforcement goes back to King Canute who enacted a forest law that made unauthorized hunting punishable by death. In 1861, Archdeacon Charles Thorp arranged purchase of some of the Farne Islands off the north-east coast of England and employment of a warden to protect threatened seabird species. The modern history of the office is linked to that of the conservation movement and has varied greatly across the world.

=== History in New York State ===
Conservation officers in New York State are known as "environmental conservation officers", or ECOs. The position was created in the late nineteenth century. Originally, they were known as "game protectors". The first game protectors recorded comprised a group of eight men authorized to arrest anyone who killed wildlife on protected land. Their job was to protect game and catch poachers. They also chose to protect streams from pollution. In 1960, their title was changed to "conservation officers", then in 1970, they were renamed "environmental conservation officers", after the Conservation Department and the State Health Department merged to become the "Department of Environmental Conservation". At the same time, the role's status was changed, giving ECOs more legal power than they had previously had.

== Education ==
Conservation officers generally have a degree in areas specific to criminal justice, fish and wildlife management, recreation management, wildlife resources, or a science major related to these. Most start out their careers as a trainee under the supervision of an experienced conservation officer. After graduation and completion of the trainee program, many go on to law enforcement training to become a peace officer. In America, conservation officers must also take and pass the state civil service exam for ECOs. The Western Conservation Law Enforcement Academy is the academy that all Officers employed in western Canada including Yukon, British Columbia, Alberta, Saskatchewan and Manitoba must graduate from in order to be appointed as Officers in their respective jurisdictions. The program is 6 months long with about 2 of those months spent as on-the-job training with a direct supervisor. Training includes dress and deportment, investigations, firearm handling, use of force, swiftwater rescue, off-road vehicle use, search warrant application and execution and much more.

== Recognizing the wardens' roles ==
As noted at the North American Game Warden Museum, confronting armed poachers in rural and even remote locations can be lonely, dangerous and even fatal work for game wardens. The museum recognizes the service of these officers concomitant to recognition at the National Law Enforcement Officers Memorial.

Officers are exposed to other risks beyond being killed by hunters, trappers and armed fishermen. Motor vehicle, boating, snowmobile and airplane accidents, animal attacks, drowning, and hypothermia are other risk they face while on duty.

In North America game wardens are typically employees of state or provincial governments. 26 of the 50 U.S. states have government departments entitled Department of Natural Resources or a similar title. These departments typically patrol state or provincial parks and public lands and waterways dedicated to hunting and fishing, and also enforce state or provincial game and environmental laws on private property. In some states such as Maryland, Massachusetts, and Connecticut, conservation officers serve in the role of marine law enforcement as well, responsible for the enforcement of local, state, and federal boating laws along with search and rescue and homeland security.

Game wardens/conservation officers are front and center in keeping out (or in check) invasive species.

In an increasingly interconnected and globalized world, their concerns are much more comprehensive than local enforcement. While conservation officers enforce wildlife, hunting, and game laws, they have transitioned to aiding other law enforcement agencies with drug enforcement, serving warrants, and at times provide effort to homeland security. They also enforce broader conservation laws, such as the Endangered Species Act, the Migratory Bird Treaty Act of 1918 and similar laws/treaties. or the Wild Animal and Plant Protection and Regulation of International and Interprovincial Trade Act (in Canada) which implements the Convention on the International Trade in Endangered Species of Wild Flora and Fauna As necessary, they will work in tandem with appropriate national or federal agencies, such as the U.S. Fish and Wildlife Service or Environment Canada.

== Conservation officers by region ==
=== Australia ===
- Australian Capital Territory Environment, Planning and Sustainable Development Directorate
- Northern Territory Department of Environment, Parks and Water Security
- Department of Primary Industries (New South Wales)
- Queensland Department of Environment and Science
- South Australia Department for Environment and Water
- Tasmania Department of Natural Resources and Environment
- Victoria Department of Energy, Environment and Climate Action
- Western Australia Conservation and Parks Commission
- Western Australia Department of Biodiversity, Conservation and Attractions

=== Canada ===
- Alberta fish and wildlife services
- British Columbia Conservation Officer Service
- British Columbia Park ranger services*NCC conservation officers
- Canadian Park wardens
- Canadian Wildlife and environmental protection officer (Canadian game officers)
- Department of Fisheries And Oceans Canada officers.
- Fondation de la faune du Québec
- Manitoba conservation officers
- Nature Conservancy of Canada (NCC)
- New Brunswick conservation officers
- North West territories fish and game
- Nunavut wildlife protection officers
- Ontario Conservation Officers
- Prince Edward Island Conservation Officers
- Saskatchewan Conservation Officer Service
- Yukon department of fish and wildlife services

=== United States ===
Federal:

- Bureau of Land Management
- National Oceanic and Atmospheric Administration Fisheries Office of Law Enforcement
- National Park Service Law Enforcement Rangers
- United States Fish and Wildlife Service Office of Law Enforcement
- United States Forest Service

State:

- Alabama Department of Conservation and Natural Resources
- Alaska State Troopers Wildlife Division
- Alaska Game and Fish
- Arizona Game and Fish Department
- Arkansas Game and Fish Commission
- California Department of Fish and Game
- California State Parks
- Colorado Parks and Wildlife
- Connecticut State Environmental Conservation Police
- Delaware Department of Natural Resources and Environmental Control
- Florida Fish and Wildlife Conservation Commission
- Georgia Department of Natural Resources
- Hawaii Department of Land and Natural Resources, Conservation and Resource Enforcement
- Idaho Department of Fish and Game
- Illinois Department of Natural Resources, Office of Law Enforcement
- Indiana Department of Natural Resources, Law Enforcement Division
- Iowa Department of Natural Resources
- Kansas Department of Wildlife, Parks and Tourism, Law Enforcement Division
- Kentucky Department of Fish and Wildlife Resources
- Louisiana Department of Wildlife & Fisheries - Enforcement Division
- Maine Marine Patrol
- Maine Warden Service
- Maryland Natural Resources Police
- Massachusetts Environmental Police
- Michigan Conservation Officers
- Minnesota Department of Natural Resources, Enforcement Division
- Mississippi Department of Wildlife, Fisheries, and Parks
- Missouri Department of Conservation
- Montana Department of Fish, Wildlife and Parks
- Nebraska Game and Parks Commission
- Nevada Department of Wildlife
- New Hampshire Fish and Game Department
- New Jersey Department of Environmental Protection, Division of Fish and Wildlife
- New Mexico Department of Game and Fish
- New York State Department of Environmental Conservation Police
- New York State Forest Rangers
- North Carolina Marine Patrol
- North Carolina Wildlife Resources Commission
- North Dakota Game and Fish Department
- Ohio Department of Natural Resources
- Oklahoma Department of Wildlife Conservation
- Oregon State Police, Fish and Wildlife division
- Pennsylvania Fish and Boat Commission
- Pennsylvania Game Commission
- Rhode Island Department of Environmental Management
- South Carolina Department of Natural Resources
- South Dakota Department of Game, Fish, and Parks
- Tennessee Wildlife Resources Agency
- Texas Parks and Wildlife Department
- Utah Department of Natural Resources, Division of Wildlife Resources
- Vermont Fish & Wildlife Department
- Vermont Game Wardens
- Virginia Department of Wildlife Resources, Law Enforcement Division
- Virginia Department of Conservation and Recreation, Division of State Parks
- Washington State Department of Fish and Wildlife
- West Virginia Natural Resources Police
- Wisconsin Department of Natural Resources
- Wyoming Game and Fish Department

=== India ===
- Andaman and Nicobar Department of Wildlife and Forests
- Andhra Pradesh Forest Department
- Assam Department of Environment and Forests
- Arunachal Pradesh Department of Environment and Forests
- Bihar Department of Environment, Forests and Climate Change
- Chandigarh Department of Forests and Wildlife
- Chhattisgarh Forest and Climate Change Department
- Goa Forest Department
- Gujarat Forest Department
- Haryana Forest Department
- Jammu and Kashmir Forest Department
- Kerala Forest and Wildlife Department
- Ladakh Department of Forests, Ecology and Environment
- Madhya Pradesh Forest Department
- Maharashtra Forest Department
- Meghalaya Forests and Environment Department
- Nagaland Department of Environment, Forests and Climate Change
- Punjab Department of Forest and Wildlife Preservation
- Sikkim Department of Forests and Wildlife
- Tamil Nadu Forest Department
- Telangana Forest Department
- Uttarakhand Forest Department
- Uttar Pradesh Department of Environment, Forests and Climate Change
- West Bengal Forest Department

=== Spain ===
- Nature Protection Service from the Civil Guard

== Notable game wardens ==
- Guy Bradley
- Paul Kroegel

== See also ==
- Gamekeeper
- North American Game Warden Museum
- Park ranger
- Pennsylvania DCNR rangers
- Trooper

== Bibliography ==
- Huss, Timothy (2009). "Outdoor Office". New York State Conservationist. 64 (2): 12–15.
- Lawson, Helene M. (2003). "Controlling the Wilderness: The Work of Wilderness Officers". Society & Animals. 11 (4): 329–351. doi:10.1163/156853003322796073.
- "Warden Trainee". Montana Fish, Wildlife & Parks.
