= National Register of Historic Places listings in Mackinac County, Michigan =

Location of Mackinac County in Michigan

This is a list of the National Register of Historic Places listings in Mackinac County, Michigan.

This is intended to be a complete list of the properties and districts on the National Register of Historic Places in Mackinac County, Michigan, United States. Latitude and longitude coordinates are provided for many National Register properties and districts; these locations may be seen together in a map.

There are 27 properties and districts listed on the National Register in the county, including 3 National Historic Landmarks.

This National Park Service list is complete through NPS recent listings posted November 6, 2026.

== Current listings ==
	Name on the Register	Image	Date listed	Location	City or town	Description
1	John Chambers House	John Chambers House	April 22, 1982 (#82002849)	90 N. State St. 45°52′02″N 84°43′24″W	St. Ignace	John Chambers was an Irish immigrant who amassed a comfortable estate farming and fishing. He built this house in 1870. Two of his sons, Michael and Patrick, increased the family fortune through real estate investments, and added the Colonial Revival front section onto the family home in 1910.
2	Fort Mackinac	Fort Mackinac	July 8, 1970 (#70000280)	Huron Rd. 45°51′08″N 84°37′02″W	Mackinac Island	Fort Mackinac was built by the British during the American Revolutionary War to control the strategic Straits of Mackinac between Lake Michigan and Lake Huron (and by extension the fur trade on the Great Lakes). It later became the scene of two strategic battles for control of the Great Lakes during the War of 1812. During most of the 19th century, it served as an outpost of the United States Army until its closure in 1895. The fort is now a museum on the grounds of Mackinac Island State Park, and contains 14 original buildings.
3	Mathew Geary House	Mathew Geary House	May 6, 1971 (#71000407)	Market St. 45°51′02″N 84°37′05″W	Mackinac Island	The Mathew Geary House is a wood-framed single family home built about 1846. Its raised basement, an architectural response to bedrock close to the surface, is characteristic of traditional Mackinac Island architecture. The Geary House remained in the Geary family until 1968, when it was purchased by the Mackinac Island State Park.
4	Grand Hotel	Grand Hotel	May 5, 1972 (#72000637)	Grand Ave. 45°51′03″N 84°37′33″W	Mackinac Island	The Grand Hotel is a historic hotel constructed in the late 19th century, the facility advertises itself as having the world's largest porch. The Grand Hotel is well known for a number of notable visitors, including five U.S. presidents, Russian prime minister Vladimir Putin, Russian president Dmitri Medvedev, inventor Thomas Edison, and author Mark Twain.
5	Gros Cap Archaeological District	Gros Cap Archaeological District	October 29, 1982 (#82000540)	West Moran Bay, SE of Gros Cap on U.S. Route 2; 45°52′00″N 84°48′00″W	Moran Township	The Gros Cap Archaeological District is a set of three archaeological sites associated with the Odawa people, who settled in the area around West Moran Bay in the late 17th century. The three sites cover 13.5 acres (5.5 ha) and include a village site and portions of the Gros Cap Cemetery.
6	Gros Cap Cemetery	Gros Cap Cemetery	April 16, 1971 (#71000406)	Southeast of Gros Cap on U.S. Route 2; 45°52′13″N 84°47′57″W	Gros Cap	The Gros Cap Cemetery, originally established by the Odawa people who settled in the area around West Moran Bay in the late 17th century is one of the oldest cemeteries in the United States to be continuously used. The cemetery contains the graves of both Indians and Europeans, with wooden crosses, 19th century headstones, and modern tombstones, and is still in use.
7	Hessel School	Hessel School	August 5, 2019 (#100004234)	3206 West Cedar Street; 46°00′21″N 84°25′48″W	Hessel	The former school building, opened in 1938, was closed in 1958. It was later remodeled as a residence, and in 2015 was rehabilitated as a community events center.
8	Hiawatha Sportsman's Club 1931 Maintenance Building and Commissary	Hiawatha Sportsman's Club 1931 Maintenance Building and Commissary	November 30, 2011 (#11000865)	Lake Blvd. (Garfield Township); 46°08′48″N 85°30′17″W	Millecoquins	In 1927, the Hiawatha Sportsman's Club was organized for the purpose of hunting, fishing, and relaxing in a relatively unspoiled environment. In 1931, the club purchased a store located in Engadine, Michigan and moved it onto their grounds to be used as a commissary. That same year, they constructed a frame building to be used as the maintenance headquarters for the club.
9	Indian Dormitory	Indian Dormitory	November 5, 1971 (#71000408)	Huron St. 45°51′04″N 84°36′55″W	Mackinac Island	The Indian Dormitory is a Federal-style structure built at U.S. government expense on Mackinac Island, Michigan, in 1838. It was a pioneering idea in building housing for Native Americans, and is a surviving fragment of the assimilationist vision of Henry Rowe Schoolcraft, the U.S. government official supervising Native American affairs and based at Mackinac Island. The building was used as a public school from 1867-1960, and is now the Richard and Jane Manoogian Mackinac Art Museum.
10	Juntunen Site	Juntunen Site	March 21, 1978 (#78001504)	Western tip of Bois Blanc Island; 45°49′00″N 84°35′00″W	Pointe Aux Pins	The Juntunen Site, also known as 20MK1, is an archaeological site comprising a large seasonal fishing camp along with five ossuaries. The site was used during the Late Woodland period, probably over a period of time between 900 and 1400 AD. The frequent but seasonal occupation of the site led to a stratified layering of archaeological remains at the site, consisting of up to 25 separate layers. The site is named for Mr. Charles Juntunen, the property owner who discovered substantial remains in 1959 while bulldozing a road.
11	Lansing Shoals Light Station	Lansing Shoals Light Station	September 6, 2005 (#05000979)	NE Lake Michigan, 6.3 mi (10.1 km) SE of Point Patterson; 45°54′12″N 85°33′42″W	Newton Township	The Lansing Shoals Light Station is a reinforced concrete lighthouse, sitting on a bed of stone on the bottom of the lake. Lightships were stationed at this spot from 1900 until 1928, when the current light station was lit. The light was automated in 1976.
12	Lasanen Site		May 6, 1971 (#71000412)	Overlooking East Moran Bay; 45°52′00″N 84°44′00″W	St. Ignace	The Lasanen Site is an Indian burial ground discovered in 1966 when a private landowner, Dr. W. C. Lasanen, unearthed human remains while excavating to construct a foundation. The site consists of nineteen small burial pits, located in an area approximately 100 feet (30 m) by 50 feet (15 m), and five more located on an adjacent property. The details unearthed at the burials are consistent with those witnessed and described by Antoine Laumet Cadillac in 1694-97, and may be the same.
13	Mackinac Island	Mackinac Island	October 15, 1966 (#66000397)	Northeast across the Straits of Mackinac from Mackinaw City; 45°51′51″N 84°37′46″W	Mackinac Island	Fort Mackinac was established on Mackinac Island during the American Revolutionary War, and the island had been populated ever since. In the late 19th century, Mackinac Island became a popular tourist attraction and summer colony. Much of the island has undergone extensive historical preservation and restoration, resulting in its Landmark status.
14	Mackinac Trail – Carp River Bridge	Mackinac Trail – Carp River Bridge	December 17, 1999 (#99001528)	Mackinac Trail over the Carp River; 46°01′06″N 84°43′06″W	St. Ignace Township	The Mackinac Trail – Carp River Bridge is a 60 feet (18 m) concrete arch bridge built in 1919. The Mackinac Trail – Carp River Bridge is one of the few remaining arch bridges constructed by the Michigan State Highway Department during its early period of design and construction, and features a unique guardrail design.
15	Manitou Lodge	Manitou Lodge	November 30, 2011 (#11000866)	G Trail, Hiawatha Sportsman's Club (Garfield Township); 46°06′08″N 85°27′37″W	Naubinway	In 1927, the Hiawatha Sportsman's Club was organized for the purpose of hunting, fishing, and relaxing in a relatively unspoiled environment. In 1930, the club put together a team or architects and contractors to construct a hotel on club property. Because of the Great Depression, the original plans were scaled back, and the log building was constructed in 1931 had 16 rooms and a lobby featuring a large limestone fireplace.
16	Marquette Street Archaeological District	Marquette Street Archaeological District	October 29, 1982 (#82000541)	Near the St. Ignace Mission; 45°52′00″N 84°44′00″W	St. Ignace	The Marquette Street Archaeological District is the location of a Petun village, occupied from approximately 1670 to 1701 and housing 500-800 people. The village was located near the site of Père Jacques Marquette's 1671 St. Ignace Mission.
17	Martin Reef Light Station	Martin Reef Light Station	July 27, 2005 (#05000743)	Northern Lake Huron, 4.3 mi (6.9 km) S of Cadogan Point; 45°54′48″N 84°08′54″W	Clark Township	After 18 years with a lightship stationed at Martin Reef, this lighthouse was constructed in 1927. The lighthouse itself is a 25 feet (7.6 m) square, white, three-story structure made of a skeletal steel frame covered with reinforced concrete and iron and sheathed with steel, sitting on concrete pier. A 16 feet (4.9 m) square, 10 feet (3.0 m) watchroom sits on the top of the lighthouse, topped with an octagonal cast iron lantern. The Poe Reef Light, built in 1929, is a duplicate of this lighthouse.
18	Mission Church	Mission Church	January 25, 1971 (#71000409)	Huron St. 45°51′00″N 84°36′32″W	Mackinac Island	The Mission Church, built in 1829 for William Montague Ferry, is the oldest church building in the state of Michigan. It was part of Ferry's Indian mission school, as was the nearby boardinghouse. Original congregants included American Fur Company magnate Robert Stuart and geographer and ethnographer Henry Schoolcraft. Ferry's mission closed in 1837 and the church was rarely used until 1894 when a new influx of primarily summer residents refurbished it and used it for summer services. The Mackinac Island State Park Commission purchased the building in 1955.
19	Mission House	Mission House	April 16, 1971 (#71000410)	Huron St. 45°51′04″N 84°36′26″W	Mackinac Island	The Mission House was built in 1825 by William Montague Ferry and his wife Amanda. The Mission House was designed as a combination school complex and boardinghouse, and was used as such until 1837. It was later used as a hotel from 1849 - 1939 and as the headquarters of the Moral Re-Armament movement. It was purchased in 1977 by the Mackinac Island State Park .
20	Round Island Lighthouse	Round Island Lighthouse	August 21, 1974 (#74000994)	S of Mackinac Island in Hiawatha National Forest; 45°50′14″N 84°37′00″W	Mackinac Island	The Round Island Light was built of painted brick in 1895; it is a twin of the Two Harbors Light in Minnesota. The light served as an active, staffed lighthouse and fog signal in 1895–1947. It was abandoned in 1947 and replaced by the Round Island Passage Light, an automated light tower located in the adjacent Round Island Channel. The abandoned lighthouse deteriorated and in 1972 when a storm caused a corner of the lighthouse structure to collapse. Emergency work to stabilize the light tower structure was conducted soon after, and more restoration work was conducted in 1995.
21	Round Island Passage Light	Round Island Passage Light	August 7, 2013 (#13000583)	Round Island Passage Channel; 45°50′35″N 84°36′56″W	Mackinac Island	Round Island Passage Light is an automated, unstaffed lighthouse. Built by the United States Coast Guard of concrete and steel in the period immediately following World War II, it was one of the last lights to be constructed on the Great Lakes.
22	Sacred Heart-Gros Cap Church	Sacred Heart-Gros Cap Church	May 3, 2016 (#16000217)	N903 Gros Cap Rd. 45°52′25″N 84°49′54″W	Moran Township	The Gros Cap Church, completed in 1919, church served as a mission of the St. Ignace church. It was attended to by the St. Ignace pastor until 1967 when the church was closed.
23	Scott Point Site		July 30, 1976 (#76001032)	Near Scott Point, west of Point Patterson; 45°57′37″N 85°41′27″W	Gould City	The Scott Point Site, designated 20MK22, is an archaeological site located near the shore of Lake Michigan. It was once a Late Woodland period village, and showed signs of seasonal fall occupation.
24	St. Helena Island Light Station	St. Helena Island Light Station	April 27, 1988 (#88000442)	St. Helena Island, Lake Michigan; 45°51′18″N 84°51′48″W	St. Ignace	The St. Helena Island Light went into operation in 1873, and in 1922 was the first Michigan lighthouse to be automated. The light is still an active aid to navigation and the buildings of the St. Helena Island Light complex are the sole surviving structures on St. Helena Island.
25	St. Ignace Mission	St. Ignace Mission	October 15, 1966 (#66000398)	State and Marquette Sts., Marquette Park; 45°52′18″N 84°43′55″W	St. Ignace	The St. Ignace Mission was established at this site in 1671 by Père Jacques Marquette, and in 1677 Marquette's remains were buried beneath the chapel. However, the mission was later abandoned, and a second mission was established about a mile south in 1837. The site of the first mission was later rediscovered, and in 1954 the second mission chapel was moved to the location of the first mission. The chapel now serves as the Museum of Ojibwa Culture.
26	Robert Stuart House	Robert Stuart House	April 16, 1971 (#71000411)	Market St. 45°50′59″N 84°37′07″W	Mackinac Island	The Robert Stuart House, also known as the Agent's House or Agency House, was built in 1817 to house the resident agent and clerks of the American Fur Company. Ramsay Crooks was the first such agent; in 1820 his assistant Robert Stuart took over the position. Stuart held the position until 1835, when the fur trade was declining. The house was later a boardinghouse, then a hotel. It is currently used as the Stuart House City Museum.
27	Lawrence Andrew Young Cottage	Lawrence Andrew Young Cottage	November 17, 1997 (#97000800)	Junction of Fort Hill and Huron Rd. 45°51′06″N 84°37′13″W	Mackinac Island	The Lawrence Andrew Young Cottage was built originally as a private residence for Chicago attorney Lawrence Andrew Young. In 1944 the Mackinac Island State Park Commission purchased the home for its original cost of $15,000. It is now used as the Michigan governor's summer residence.

== See also ==
- List of Michigan State Historic Sites in Mackinac County, Michigan
- List of National Historic Landmarks in Michigan
- National Register of Historic Places listings in Michigan
- Listings in neighboring counties: Cheboygan, Chippewa, Emmet, Luce, Schoolcraft
