= List of Michigan State Historic Sites in Mackinac County =

Location of Mackinac County in Michigan

The following is a list of Michigan State Historic Sites in Mackinac County, Michigan. Sites marked with a dagger (†) are also listed on the National Register of Historic Places in Mackinac County, Michigan. Those with a double dagger (‡) are also designated National Historic Landmarks.

== Current listings ==
Name	Image	Location	City	Listing date
Agency House Informational Site		Huron Street	Mackinac Island	February 12, 1959
Agency House of the American Fur Company†	Robert Stuart Office Building	7342 Market Street	Mackinac Island	March 23, 1965
American Fur Company Store / Beaumont Memorial Informational Site	American Fur Company Store	Market Street at Fort Street	Mackinac Island	2003
Battlefield of 1814 Informational Site	Battle of 1814	Near Wawashkamo Golf Club, on British Landing Road	Mackinac Island	March 19, 1958
Biddle House	Biddle House - Mackinaw Island	Market Street	Mackinac Island	July 19, 1956
Bois Blanc Island Informational Designation		Ferry Docks	Pointe Aux Pins	May 10, 1990
Bois Blanc Lighthouse		Lighthouse Point (north end of island)	Bois Blanc Island	July 26, 1974
Bonga Tavern Informational Designation		Laheshore Drive just north of Astor Street	Mackinac Island	2023
British Cannon Informational Site		Rear of Fort Mackinac, high ground north of the fort	Mackinac Island	February 12, 1959
British Landing Informational Site		Northwest shore of Mackinac Island	Mackinac Island	March 19, 1958
Ambrose R. Davenport House	Ambrose Davenport House	North Street, Hubbard's Annex	Mackinac Island	June 30, 1988
Davis-Preston House	David-Preston House	6806 Huron Street	Mackinac Island	May 17, 1978
Early French Missionary Chapel	French Missionary Chapel	Fort Street, north of Main, near sidewalk to fort	Mackinac Island	May 1, 1959
Epoufette Informational Site	Epoufette	US 2 scenic turnout overlooking Epoufette Bay	Epoufette	July 23, 1985
Fort De Buade Informational Site		State Street	St. Ignace	September 25, 1956
Fort Holmes Informational Site		Fort Holmes Road, north of the business district	Mackinac Island	September 25, 1956
Historic Fort Mackinac†		Huron Road	Mackinac Island	February 19, 1958
Mathew Geary House†		Market Street	Mackinac Island	February 11, 1970
Grand Hotel‡	Grand Hotel MI From Lake	Grand Hotel Avenue	Mackinac Island	July 12, 1957
Gros Cap and St. Helena Island Informational Site	Gros Cap Island	Park on US 2, 6 miles west of St. Ignace	St. Ignace vicinity	January 19, 1961
Gros Cap Cemetery†		SE of Gros Cap on US 2	Gros Cap vicinity	November 6, 1970
High Rollway Informational Designation		Lake Michigan Shore, between Brevort and Epoufette	Moran Township	May 11, 1965
Home of the Ancestors Informational Designation		Garrison Road at Skull Cave	Mackinac Island	2020
Hubbard's Annex to the National Park Informational Designation		Park Ave at Grand Ave	Mackinac Island	2014
Indian Dormitory† / Henry R. Schoolcraft Informational Designation		Huron Street, next to Marquette Park	Mackinac Island	February 17, 1965
Island House	Island House-Mackinaw Island	6966 Main	Mackinac Island	March 14, 1973
Lake Michigan Informational Designation		US 2 west of St. Ignace, near Gros Cap	St. Ignace vicinity	January 19, 1957
Lake View House	Lake View Hotel	7452 Main St	Mackinac Island	January 13, 1982
Little Stone Church	Union Congregational Church - Mackinaw Island	1590 Cadotte Street	Mackinac Island	March 28, 1979
Mackinac Conference Informational Site		Grounds of the Grand Hotel	Mackinac Island	August 15, 1975
Mackinac Island‡ / Mackinac Island Informational Designation		Market Street	Mackinac Island	July 19, 1956
Mackinac Straits Informational Designation		I-75 Rest Area and Visitors Center, just north of Mackinac Bridge exit	St. Ignace vicinity	August 23, 1956
Manitou Lodge†	Hiawatha Sportsman Club Manitou Lodge	Hiawatha Sportsman's Club, Museum Trail off US 2 Garfield Township	Naubinway	January 23, 1997
Market Street Informational Designation	Market Street Informational	Market Street	Mackinac Island	July 19, 1956
Mission Church†		Huron Street, corner of Truscott Street	Mackinac Island	July 19, 1956
Mission House†		6633 Main St	Mackinac Island	November 6, 1970
Northernmost Point of Lake Michigan Informational Designation	Northern Lake Michigan	Roadside park on US 2, 3 miles east of Naubinway	Naubinway vicinity	April 14, 1964
Parade Grounds / Scouts Barrack Informational Designation		Huron Road just east of Fort Mackinac	Mackinac Island	2015
Portage Road Informational Designation		Roadside Park on US 2, just west of St. Ignace, near intersection of Old Portage Road	St. Ignace vicinity	April 11, 1963
Round Island Lighthouse Informational Designation†		Foot of Huron Street, next to the Iroquois Hotel, in the municipal park overlooking the lighthouse	Mackinac Island	April 23, 1971
St. Ignace Informational Designation	St. Ignace Informational	State Ferry Dock No. 1	St. Ignace	July 19, 1956
Sainte Anne Church	Saint Anns Catholic Church	Huron Street at the corner of Church Street	Mackinac Island	December 20, 1990
Silver Birches		4082 M-185, NE part of the island	Mackinac Island	September 8, 1982
Skull Cave		Garrison Road	Mackinac Island	January 12, 1959
St. Ignace Mission‡		Marquette Park, Marquette and State Streets	St. Ignace	August 23, 1956
Robert Stuart House	Robert Stuart Office Building	7342 Market Street	Mackinac Island	June 23, 1983
Trinity Episcopal Church	Trinity Episcopal Church-Mackinaw Island	Fort Street	Mackinac Island	July 11, 1968
USCG Maple W-234		Harbor	Mackinac Island	July 15, 1999
Wawashkamo Golf Club		British Landing Road	Mackinac Island	September 8, 1982
G. Mennen Williams Summer Home		West Bluff	Mackinac Island	January 19, 1978
Lawrence Andrew Young Cottage†		Huron Road	Mackinac Island	October 21, 1975

== See also ==
- National Register of Historic Places listings in Mackinac County, Michigan

== Sources ==
- Historic Sites Online – Mackinac County. Michigan State Housing Developmental Authority. Accessed May 12, 2011.
