= Joseph Marest =

Joseph Marest (19 March 1953 in Chartres, France – October 1725 in Montreal), was a Jesuit missionary in New France in the late 1600s and early 1700s. He is known chiefly for remaining in Michilimackinac/ St. Ignace Mission as missionary to the Ottawas after Antoine de la Mothe Cadillac moved the center of the French fur trade from Fort de Buade to Fort Detroit in 1701.

He served in the straits of Mackinaw from 1700 to 1714 at St. Ignace and Michilimackinac. He came to New France about 1686 and arrived at Michilimackinac in 1688. After serving in 1690 with Nicolas Perrot's failed mission the Sioux country, Marest returned to the straits of mackinaw. Joseph Marest was the brother of Jesuit Pierre-Gabriel Marest, who served in the Illinois country.
