= Fort de Buade =

French colonial fort in present-day St. Ignace, Michigan, USA (1683–1701)

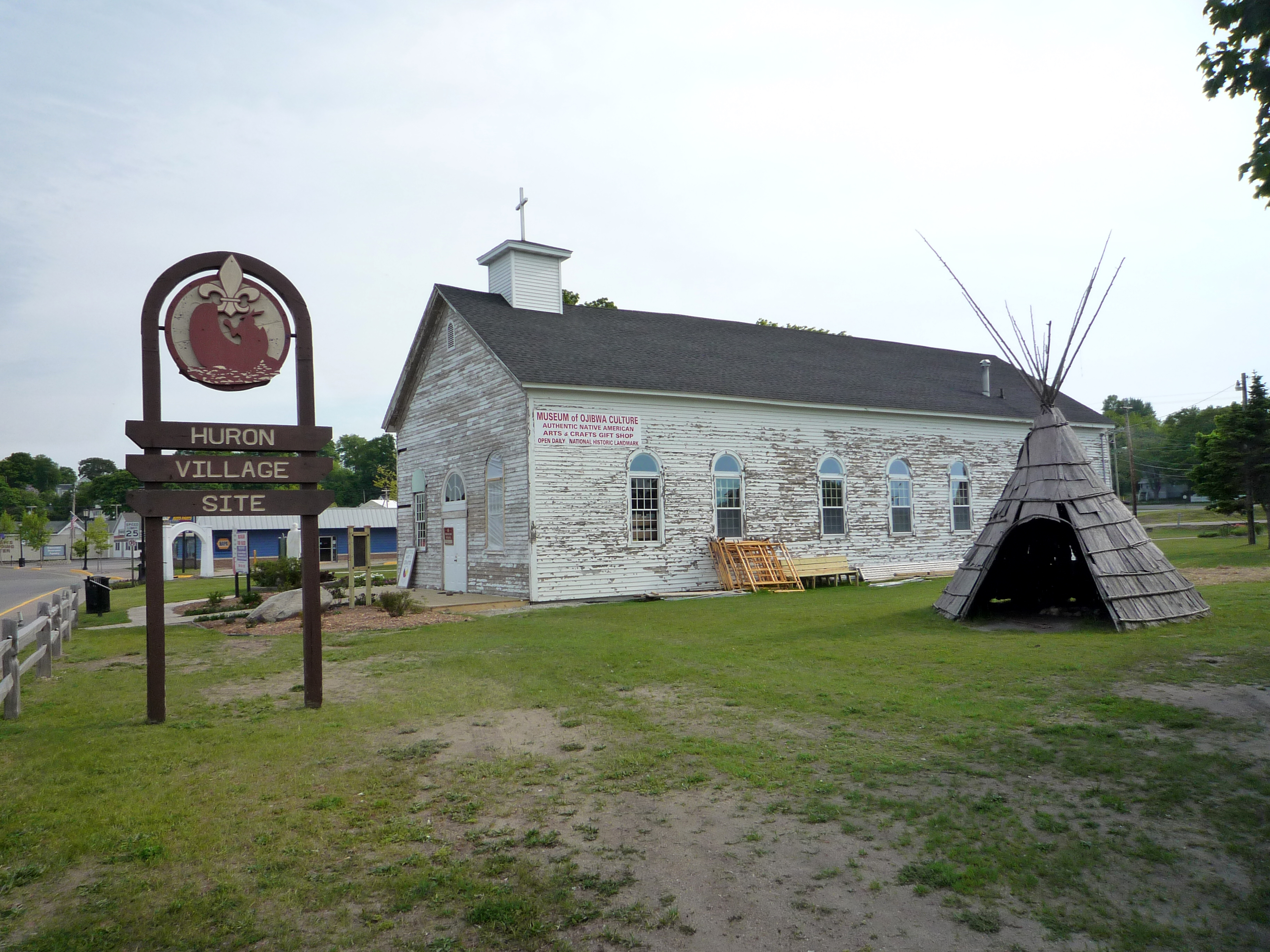
- Museum of Ojibwa Culture

Site information
- Type: Fort
- Controlled by: New France

Site history
- Built: 1683
- In use: 1683-1701
- Battles/wars: Iroquois Wars - War with the English

Fort de Buade Informational Designation
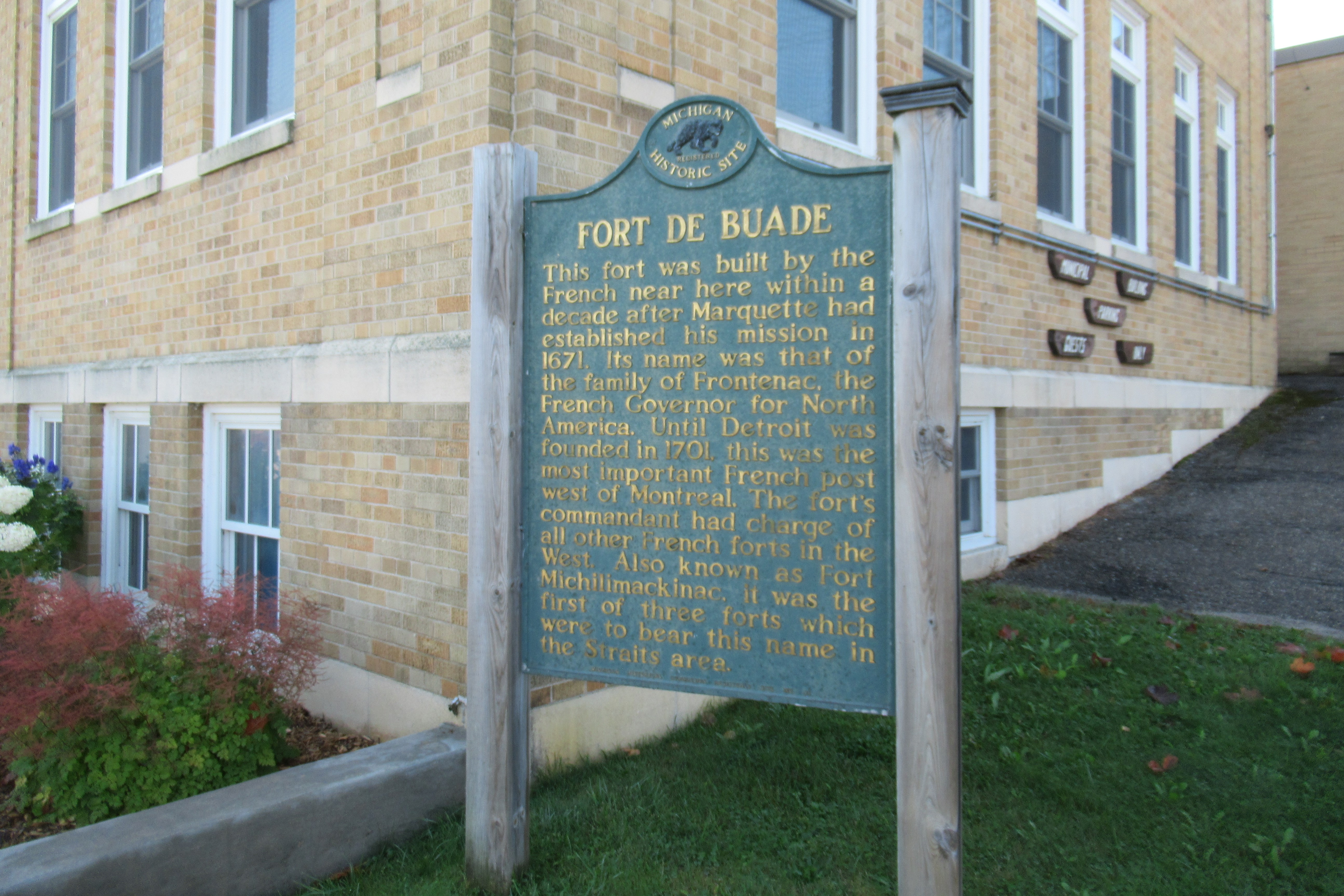

- Location within the state of Michigan
- 45°52′07″N 84°43′45″W
- Location: 396 North State Street; St. Ignace, Michigan

Michigan State Historic Site
- Designated: September 25, 1956

Fort de Buade was a French fort in the present U.S. state of Michigan's Upper Peninsula across the Straits of Mackinac from the northern tip of lower Michigan's "mitten". It was garrisoned between 1683 and 1701. The city of St. Ignace developed at the site, which also had the historic St. Ignace Mission founded by Jesuits. The fort was named after New France's governor at the time, Louis de Buade de Frontenac.

== Mission ==
The French-Canadian settlement at St. Ignace began with the Mission of Saint Ignace, founded by Father Jacques Marquette, S.J. in 1671. By 1680 it had become a considerable community consisting of the mission, a French village of a dozen cabins, a Wendat (Huron) Indian village surrounded by a wooden palisade and an adjacent Odawa (Ottawa) village, also behind a palisade. In 1681, the Huron and Illiniwek at St. Ignace killed the Seneca chief Annanhac, who had been leading his forces against the western peoples. The Seneca were part of the Iroquois Confederacy based in present-day New York state.

Sharp practice by the fur traders also caused tensions. In 1683, Governor Joseph-Antoine de La Barre ordered Daniel Greysolon, Sieur du Lhut and Olivier Morel de La Durantaye to establish a strategic presence on the north shore of the Straits of Mackinac, connecting Lake Michigan and Lake Huron of the Great Lakes. They fortified the Jesuit mission and La Durantaye settled in as overall commander of the French forts in the northwest: Fort Saint Louis des Illinois (Utica, Illinois); Fort Kaministigoya (Thunder Bay, Ontario); and Fort la Tourette (Lake Nipigon, Ontario). He was also responsible for the region around Green Bay in present-day Wisconsin.

In the spring of 1684, La Durantaye led a relief expedition from Saint Ignace to Fort Saint Louis des Illinois, which had been besieged by the Seneca as part of the Beaver Wars as they sought to gain more hunting ground to control the lucrative fur trade. That summer, and again in 1687, La Durantaye led coureurs de bois and Indians from the Straits against the Seneca homeland in upstate New York. During these years, English traders from New York entered the Great Lakes and traded at Michilimackinac. This, and the outbreak of war between England and France in 1689, led to the construction of Fort de Buade in 1690 by the new commandant Louis de La Porte de Louvigné.

== Forts ==
=== Fort de Buade at St. Ignace ===
During the 1690s, the fort became a staging area for French and Indian attacks against the Seneca, who were then allied to the English. It remained an important fur trading center and a distribution point for arms and munitions for the war against the Iroquois. In 1694 Governor Louis de Buade de Frontenac sent an aggressive young protégé, Antoine de la Mothe Cadillac, to run the post. Cadillac made a small fortune as the post commander, possibly by collecting bribes. In 1697, the Huron chief Kondiaronk from Michilimackinac led an attack on the Seneca at Lake Erie. He gained a crushing victory and dashed the Seneca hopes for victory against the French. Four years later, Kondiaronk took a leading role in forging the Great Peace of Montreal, which would conclude the war.

Relations between the fort and the adjacent Jesuit mission were not good during Cadillac's tenure. La Durantaye had ruled Michilimackinac with a firm hand. He controlled the trade in brandy, policed the fur trade, and kept the traders in line. An honest man, he would spend the last years of his life in relative poverty. Cadillac did not hold to these standards. He brought in for sale much of the alcohol at the post. The missionaries, led by Etienne de Carheil, accused Cadillac of encouraging the sale and trading of brandy to the Native Americans. Cadillac may have seen this move as a necessary tactic to check the English traders. In any case, he used it as a tactic in his own financial plans.

Despite Cadillac's liquor trade, Anglo-French commercial competition continued. Cadillac was replaced as commandant by Alphonse Tonti, brother of the explorer Henri de Tonti. In 1701, Cadillac asked permission from Paris to found a new post on the Detroit River, to interdict the flow of British trade goods into the Lake Huron area. In that sense, the Fort de Buade garrison was related to development of the future city of Detroit.

The final fate of Fort de Buade is unclear. After the withdrawal of the garrison, coureurs de bois continued to frequent Michilimackinac. Governor Philippe de Rigaud Vaudreuil used these traders to smuggle goods to the northern nations during the War of the Spanish Succession, despite the objections of Jérôme Phélypeaux, comte de Pontchartrain. Among his agents was the voyageur Daniel Amiot de Villeneuve. Unless the fort was destroyed when the garrison was evacuated, Vaudreuil's men likely used it to store goods intended for the Indians, until the new fort was completed on the south side of the Straits (1715). After this date few French remained at East Moran Bay. The fort was either destroyed or fell into disrepair and eventually disappeared.

The 1690-1701 Fort de Buade was probably built as a wooden stockade. It is believed to have been located on a site within the current municipality of St. Ignace, possibly on a hill above East Moran Bay locally called "Fort Hill." The fort could also have been located on the bay's waterfront. As of October 2022 the fort's remains had not yet been found.

=== Successor fort near Mackinaw City ===
Between 1701 and 1715 there was no official French-Canadian presence at the Straits of Mackinac. Unlicensed fur trading by coureurs des bois no doubt continued during this period. In 1715 a French detachment under Constant le Marchand de Lignery re-established a presence at the Straits of Mackinac to prepare for war against the Fox nation in Wisconsin (Fox Wars). The new post, called Fort Michilimackinac, was built on the south shore of the Straits. Present-day Mackinaw City, Michigan developed near it. Most of the Huron migrated south to Detroit with Cadillac in 1701. The Ottawa moved from East Moran Bay to the new fort, and the St. Ignace area was largely abandoned until the nineteenth century.
