= Pickle boat =

Pickle boat or pickleboat may refer to:

- Pickle boat, the last boat to finish the Port Huron to Mackinac Boat Race
- Pickle boat (pickleball), the name origin for the sport.
