= Port Huron to Mackinac Boat Race =

Annual freshwater race in Michigan, U.S.

The Bayview Mackinac Boat Race is run by the Bayview Yacht Club of Detroit, Michigan. It is one of the longest fresh-water races in the world with over two hundred boats entering the race each year.

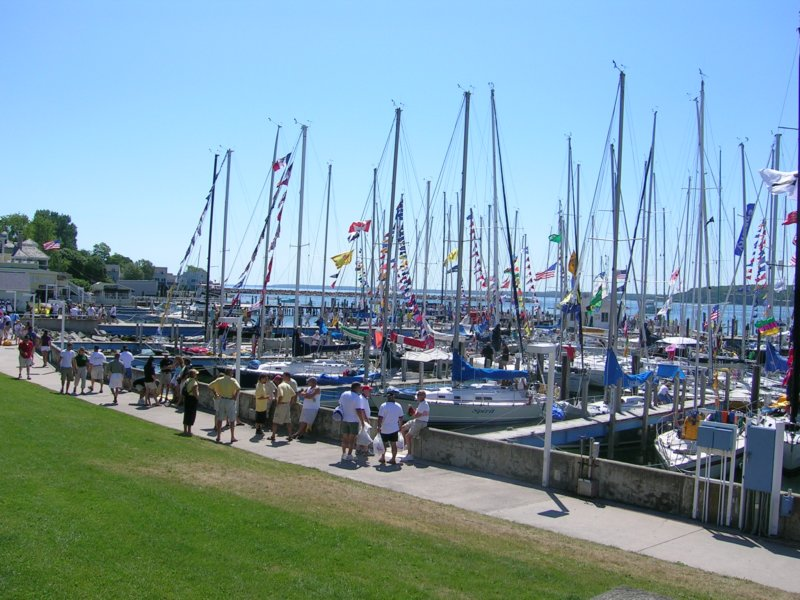
Mackinac Island Marina after the 2006 Port Huron to Mackinac Race

There have been at least six changes to the course throughout the race's history. All of the race's courses start in the waters of Lower Lake Huron, 4.5 miles (7.2 km) north of the Blue Water Bridge near the American shoreline, traverse the length of Lake Huron, and finish in the Round Island Channel off Mackinac Island, Michigan. Currently, the Race features two courses, one Shore Course sailing up the Michigan shoreline, and a Cove Island Course that takes boats around a buoy off Cove Island in northeast Lake Huron. Both courses finish at Mackinac Island.

== History ==
The first race was held in 1925 with the sloop Bernida skippered by Russ Pouliot winning against 12 yachts. In the 2012 race, Bernida once again raced with owner/skipper Al Declercq claiming victory in PHRF H and Overall for the Shore Course along with his crew Matthew (son), Ken and Connor Flaska, and Fred and Ward Detwiler. They finished around 1130 AM Monday. Dozens of divisions and classes of boats were added over the years.

During the 1985 sail race, the whole fleet experienced heavy weather. The 35-foot yacht Tomahawk was damaged and her crew of eight abandoned ship. They were rescued from their life raft by Charles Bayer, skipper of the yacht Old Bear. Tomahawk sank 28 miles northwest of Tobermory, Ontario. Of the 305 boats entered in the 1985 race, 96 abandoned the race. The estimated total damage to the fleet was $500,000. Throughout the history of the race, with strict safety enforcements, Bayview prides itself on never having had a fatality.

The inaugural race course was 235 statute miles (378 km) up the Michigan shore line south of Bois Blanc. Originally it was started at the same time as the Chicago Race to Mackinac with the yachts crossing the finish line from two different directions. In 1935, the course was lengthened to 290 miles (470 km) and required participants to round Cove Island Buoy off the Bruce Peninsula. Fog created confusion and the longer course was abandoned as dangerous and slow in 1936. In 1940 the race rounded the Six Fathoms Shoal buoy for that year only. The following year the race went back to shore course but left Bois Blanc to port. In 1972 the 290-mile (470 km) Cove Island course was restored. Twenty years later, participating yachts were divided into two separate fleets, with one heading east to round Cove Island and the other following the original shore course. After the Canadian government's decision to decommission the Cove Island buoy in 2000, the longer course was replaced with the Southampton Course in which sailors are directed toward Southampton, Ontario and then to the finish line at Mackinac Island.

In 2007, the Bayview Yacht Club announced a new course (Thunder Bay Course) in which all boats round at NOAA Weather Buoy 45003, located about 43 miles (69 km) northeast of Alpena, Michigan. Longer than the shore course but not quite as lengthy as the Southampton or Cove Island courses, it marked the first time in 15 years that all Port Huron to Mackinac racing yachts followed a unified course. In 2009 the race returned to the Cove Island course (rounding a private buoy), with cruising and smaller boats sailing the Thunder Bay course. In 2010 the Thunder Bay course was eliminated and the Shore Course reinstated. From 2010 to the present the two courses have been the Cove Island course and the Shore Course.

In 2012 the finish line was relocated from the east end of the island off of Mission Point. Boats now finish between the Round Island Lighthouse on Round Island and a point on the shoreline located west of the main harbor. The Round Island Passage Light, which is located off the west breakwall of the harbor, was added as a mark of the course in 2012.

From 2011 until 2019 the title sponsor of the race was Bell's Brewery of Kalamazoo, Michigan and the race was designated the Bell's Beer Bayview Mackinac Race. Since 2020, the race has been officially termed the "Bayview Mackinac Race."

The July 2019 running of the race was the 95th such annual event, with 202 sailboats registered. News coverage at the time indicated that the race continued over the years in spite of war and economic depression.

== The race ==
The two Port Huron race courses allow for maximum participation from yachts ranging in size from 26 feet (7.9 m) to more than 80 feet (24 m). In 2015 they allow a new minimum of 24 feet (7.3 m) to compete. Allowing Target Practice and Solvo to be the first Cal25s to participate and complete the race.

The Port Huron to Mackinac Race is often confused with the Chicago Yacht Club Race to Mackinac. They were held on the same weekend until 1939, when both clubs agreed to alternate the date of their Mackinac races, scheduling them a week apart. In even years the Port Huron race is first to allow participants of the Newport Bermuda Race to sail both events. The Chicago-to-Mackinac race is older, starting in 1898, and slightly longer.

The Friday night before the start of the race is called Boat Night. Thousands of people: sailors and cheerful spectators, alike, line the banks of the Black River, Port Huron to view the yachts. The parties will last until well after dawn on Saturday.

The race begins Saturday afternoon with the smallest boats starting first and the largest the last to cross the starting line. Boats typically begin finishing at Mackinac Island Sunday evening through Tuesday morning. The finish line can be viewed from a number of places including Fort Mackinac and Mission Point Resort.

Boats are measured to determine handicaps. The fastest boat in the fleet is the scratch boat and has no time allowance. All other boats have time allowance handicaps which are subtracted from the elapsed sailing time. Over the years various handicapping systems have been used including CCA, IOR, PHRF, IMS, IRC and ORR. In 2016 the Cove Island course used the ORR handicap system while the shore course used PHRF. In 2017 the shore course will start using the ORR-EZ handicap system.

Since 2009 the race has used internet tracking for all the participants. Throughout the event race fans can track the progress of the yachts. The last boat to finish the race is called the "pickle boat". The origin of the name comes from English yachting, where the last boat was called the "fisher." The boats used to stop to fish for herring and then pickle them. The pickling required the boat to take even longer to come into port.

The race and an awards celebration, while held on the lawn of Mission Point Resort in a number of previous years, was held in Woodfill Park below the Grand Hotel from 2012 to 2021. That celebration moved back to the lawn of Mission Point Resort in 2022. Flags and trophies are presented to all the winning skippers of each division and class.

== Tradition ==
Racers who have completed 25 of the annual Port Huron to Mackinac races are called "Old Goats," while those who have completed 50 are called "Grand Rams." People who work for 15 years on the Race Committee are honored with the title "Old Forts."
