= Pierre-Gabriel Marest =

French Jesuit missionary (1662–1714)

Pierre-Gabriel Marest (sometimes Maret, Marais; October 14, 1662 – September 15, 1714, in Kaskaskia (Randolph County, Illinois)) was a French Jesuit missionary in Canada.

He entered the novitiate in October 1681 in Paris. For the next six years he was an instructor at Vannes. Then followed a few years of additional studies in Bourges and Paris.

== Expedition to York Fort ==
In 1694 Marest was sent to Canada and chosen chaplain of an expedition under Pierre Le Moyne d'Iberville that was being outfitted to try to take the Hudson Bay region from the English. This was "contrary to my inclinations" he wrote, since he was anxious to work among the Indians.

The expedition sailed from Quebec on August 10 of that year in two frigates, the Poli and the Salamandre. Marest wrote a running account of the voyage. Near the end of August they reached the entrance to Hudson Bay. On September 24 they entered the Nelson (Bourbon) River, next to the mouth of the Hayes (Sainte-Thérèse) River. The English had built York Fort at the mouth of the latter river. The Poli anchored on the Nelson and the Salamandre, with Iberville and Marest, on the Hayes. The Salamandre was "near being lost" according to Marest before finally anchoring.

On October 13, 1694, the French were ready to bombard the fort. They asked the English to surrender. On the 14th, the English, led by Thomas Walsh, brought a list of their conditions, written in Latin by the English minister, Thomas Anderson. Marest translated the conditions for the French, the English surrendered, and the French took possession of the fort. They renamed it Fort Bourbon. Marest said a thanksgiving mass.

During the long winter, the French, including Marest, developed scurvy. Marest busied himself learning the native language, apparently from word lists supplied him before his arrival. He wrote a dictionary and translated the sign of the cross, some prayers and the Ten Commandments.

The following summer (1695) Iberville returned to France with his English prisoners. Marest remained behind with the garrison of 80 men. In September 1696 Hudson's Bay Company ships retook the fort, and Marest was himself taken prisoner. He was sent to England, where he remained in prison for some months.

== Illinois Country ==
He returned to Canada shortly thereafter, probably early in 1697. In 1698 he was assigned to the mission of the Immaculate Conception in the Illinois country (then under French control as part of Louisiana). The mission had been founded by Father Jacques Gravier and served a confederacy of tribes, among them the Kaskaskias, Cahokias, Peorias, Tamaroas and Michigameas. This was the sort of assignment Marest had hoped for on his first arrival in North America.

He showed a talent for languages, learning the local indigenous language in a few months. He evangelized the Indians, ministered to the converts, continued his journals, and lived very simply.

In the fall of 1700 the Kaskaskias began moving south to be closer to the French for protection. Gravier and Marest accompanied them. After four days journey they stopped at the Cahokia (or Tamaroa) mission at the mouth of the Des Pères River. This was not a Jesuit mission, but rather a mission of the Séminaire des Missions Étrangères, and the priests of the two missions were somewhat antagonistic. The jurisdictional dispute was referred to Versailles, and an ecclesiastical commission supported the Séminaire. As a result of the decision the Kaskaskias and Fathers Gravier and Marest started again on their trek.

In the spring of 1703 they established the village of Kaskaskia, now in Randolph County, Illinois.

== Kaskaskia ==
The new community faced problems from Canadian traders, who supplied spirits and seduced the women. Marest asked for help from Jean-Baptiste Le Moyne de Bienville, governor of Louisiana, who sent a sergeant and 12 men. Among the soldiers was the diarist André Péigaut.

As the result of infection from an arrow wound inflicted by the Peorias, Gravier left the Illinois country in 1705 to return to France. (He died in 1708 in Mobile on his return.) Relations with the Peorias remained strained, and the mission to them was closed. In 1711, having heard that the tribe was repentant, Marest decided to visit them and to continue on to Michilimackinac for a conference with the superior, Father Joseph Marest (Gabriel Marest's brother).

He set out on April 10, 1711, accompanied by several Indians. He spent a fortnight in the Peoria village, and then continued on to the mission to the Potawatomis on the St. Joseph River, where his brother met him. They had not seen each other in 15 years. They left together for Michilimackinac, where Gabriel Marest stayed two months.

On his return he stopped again at the village of the Peorias, where he was warmly welcomed. He arrived back at Kaskaskia on September 10. From there he wrote a detailed account of his travels to Father Barthélemi Germon, also a Jesuit. Nearly all of the Kaskaskia residents were now Christians, he reported. The settlement had grown, and now included many Frenchmen, some of whom had married Indian women. He reported also on the life of the missionaries: "our life is passed in threading dense forests, in climbing mountains, in crossing lakes and rivers in canoes...."

Marest died at Kaskaskia in September 1714 during an epidemic, after an illness of only eight days. Father Jean Mermet issued a circular announcing his death the following year. In 1727 Father Jean-Antoine Le Boullenger reinterred his remains in the new Kaskaskia church.

His writings lived after him. His scholarship, as his devotion, were praised by the fellow missionaries.

== Bibliography ==
- J.G. Shea, ed., Early voyages up and down the Mississippi, by Cavelier, St. Cosme, Le Sueur, Gravier, and Guignas (Albany, 1861)
- R.G. McWilliams, ed. and trans., Fleur de Lys and calumet: being the Pénicaut narrative of French adventure in Louisiana, (Baton Rouge, La., 1953)
- Rich, Hudson's Bay Company Series, Vol. XXI (Champlain Society)
- Jérémie, Twenty years at York Factory (Douglas and Wallace)
- (in French) Lettres édifiantes et curieuses, escrites des missions étrangeres par quelques missionaires de la Compagnie de Jésus (30v., Paris, 1707–73; nouv. éd., 26v., Paris, 1780–83), VI.
- Sister Mary Borgias Palm, The Jesuit Missions of the Illinois Country, 1673–1763 (n.p., 1933)
- (in French) J.S. Camille de Rochemonteix, Les Jésuites et la Nouvelle-France au XVIIIe siècle (Paris, 1906)
- Joseph Wallace, The history of Illinois and Louisiana under the French rule (Cincinnati, 1893)
