= Marquette Street Archaeological District =

Archaeological site in Michigan, United States

- U.S. National Register of Historic Places
- U.S. Historic district
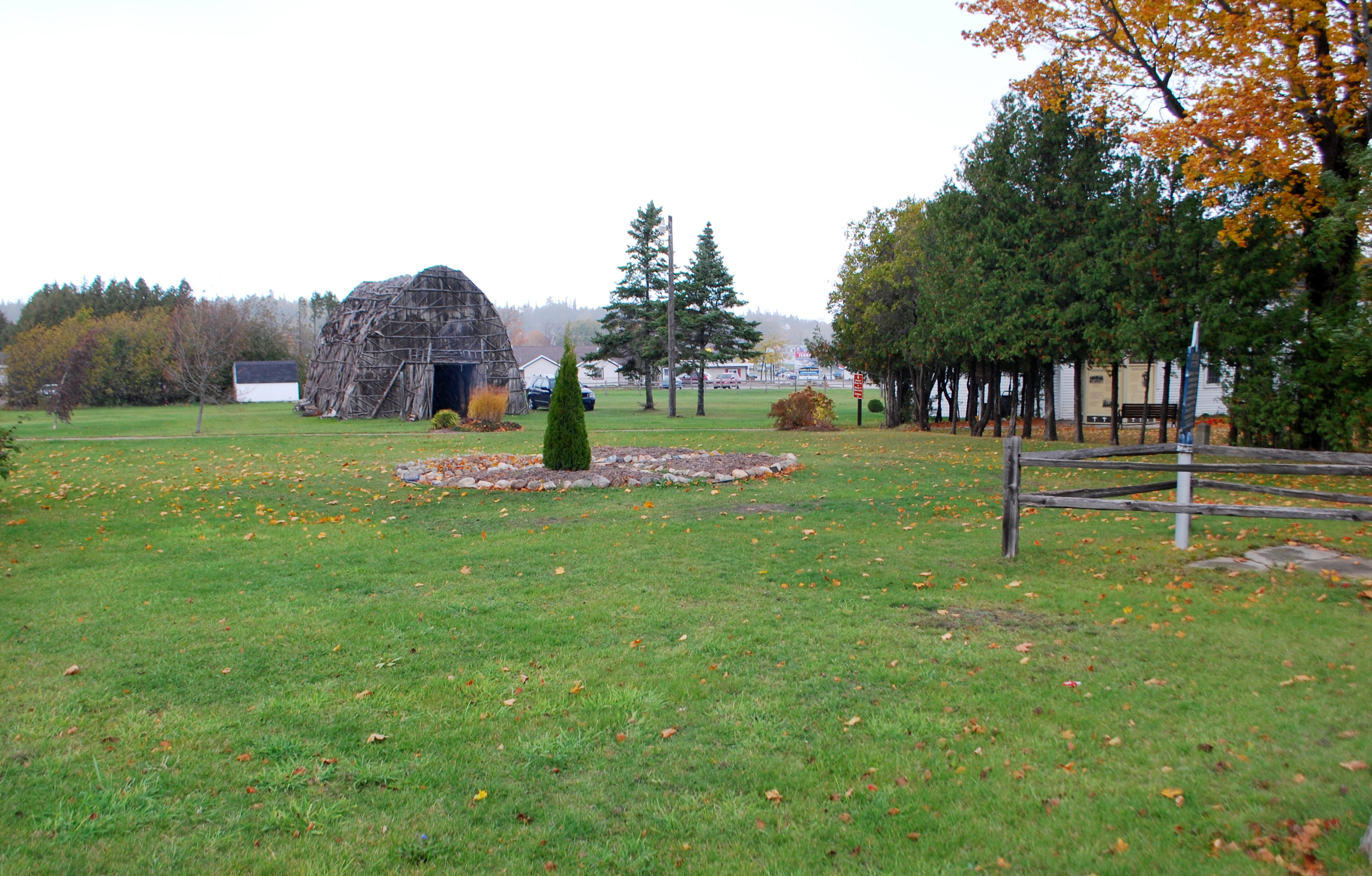
- Region of archaeological district

- Location within Michigan Location within the United States
- Location: Near the St. Ignace Mission, St. Ignace, Michigan
- Coordinates: 45°52′0″N 84°44′0″W
- Area: 6 acres (2.4 ha)
- NRHP reference No.: 82000541
- Added to NRHP: October 29, 1982

The Marquette Street Archaeological District is an archaeological site in St. Ignace, Michigan near the St. Ignace Mission. It covers 6 acres (2.4 ha) and includes one building, a village site, and a cemetery; archaeological designations are 20MK82 and 20MK99. It was listed on the National Register of Historic Places in 1982.

== Early history ==
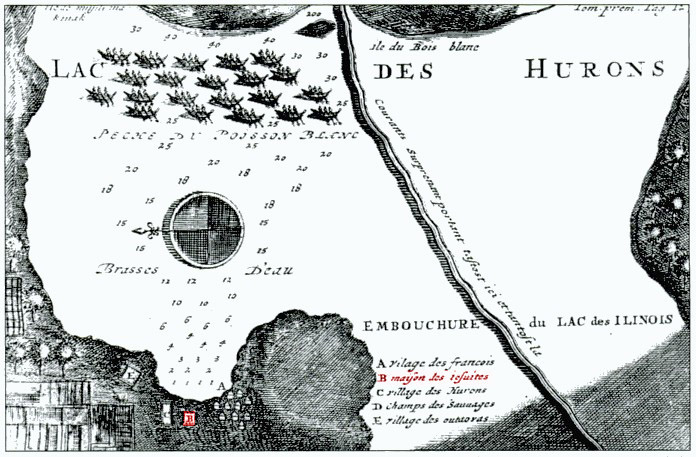
A 1717 map of St. Ignace showing the location of the Jesuit Mission (in red at lower middle-left) on East Moran Bay; the Petun (Huron) village lies just to the north (left).

The Petun people originally lived east of Georgian Bay, but were driven by the Iroquois into what is now Wisconsin. In the 1660s, the Petun were again displaced by the Sioux, and settled in what is now St. Ignace around 1670. By this time, the reduction in numbers of Petun, due to disease and war, was so severe that some experts believe they were no longer culturally viable.

Père Jacques Marquette established his mission near the village a few years later. The village was home to 500-800 people. The Petun remained in this location until 1701, when Antoine de la Mothe Cadillac persuaded them to move south when he founded Detroit.

== Excavations ==
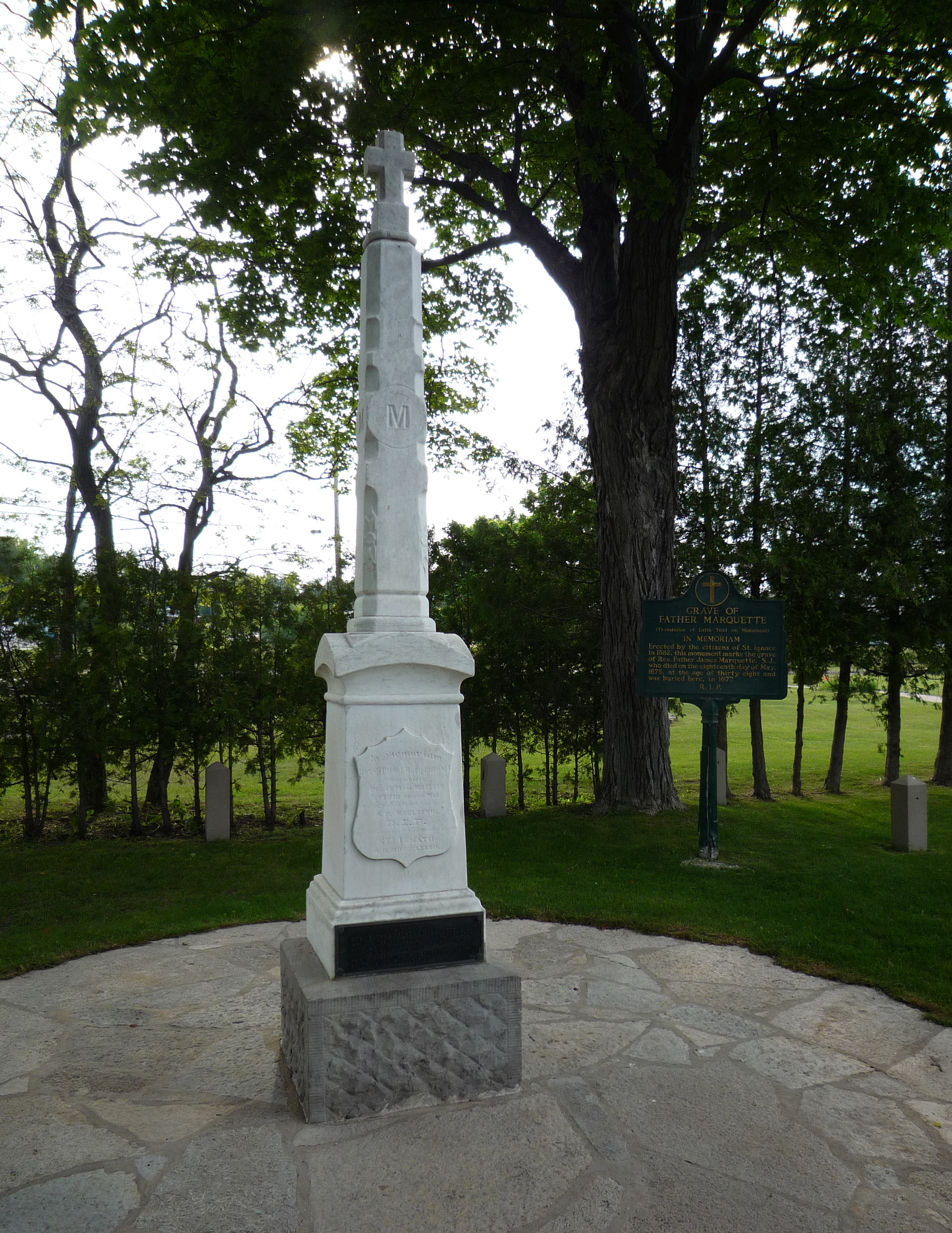
Gravesite monument for Père Jacques Marquette near Archaeological District

The site of the Petun village in St. Ignace was excavated in the 1970s, and again in 1983-86, 1996–97, and 2001. Excavations have shown evidence of Petun longhouses and hearths, and acculturation from exposure to nearby European settlers. In particular, the Petun reused European glass and metal fragments to fashion weapons and ornaments, and incorporated elements of Christian worship into their own rituals. However, the Petun cultural identity remained despite their repeated displacement, reduction in numbers, and exposure to European culture and goods.
