= Round Island (Michigan) =

Island in Mackinac County, Michigan USA

- Location within Michigan

Geography
- Location: Lake Huron near the Straits of Mackinac
- Coordinates: 45°49′47″N 84°36′05″W
- Area: 1.53 km^{2} (0.59 sq mi)

Administration
- United States
- State: Michigan
- County: Mackinac County
- City: Mackinac Island

Demographics
- Population: Uninhabited

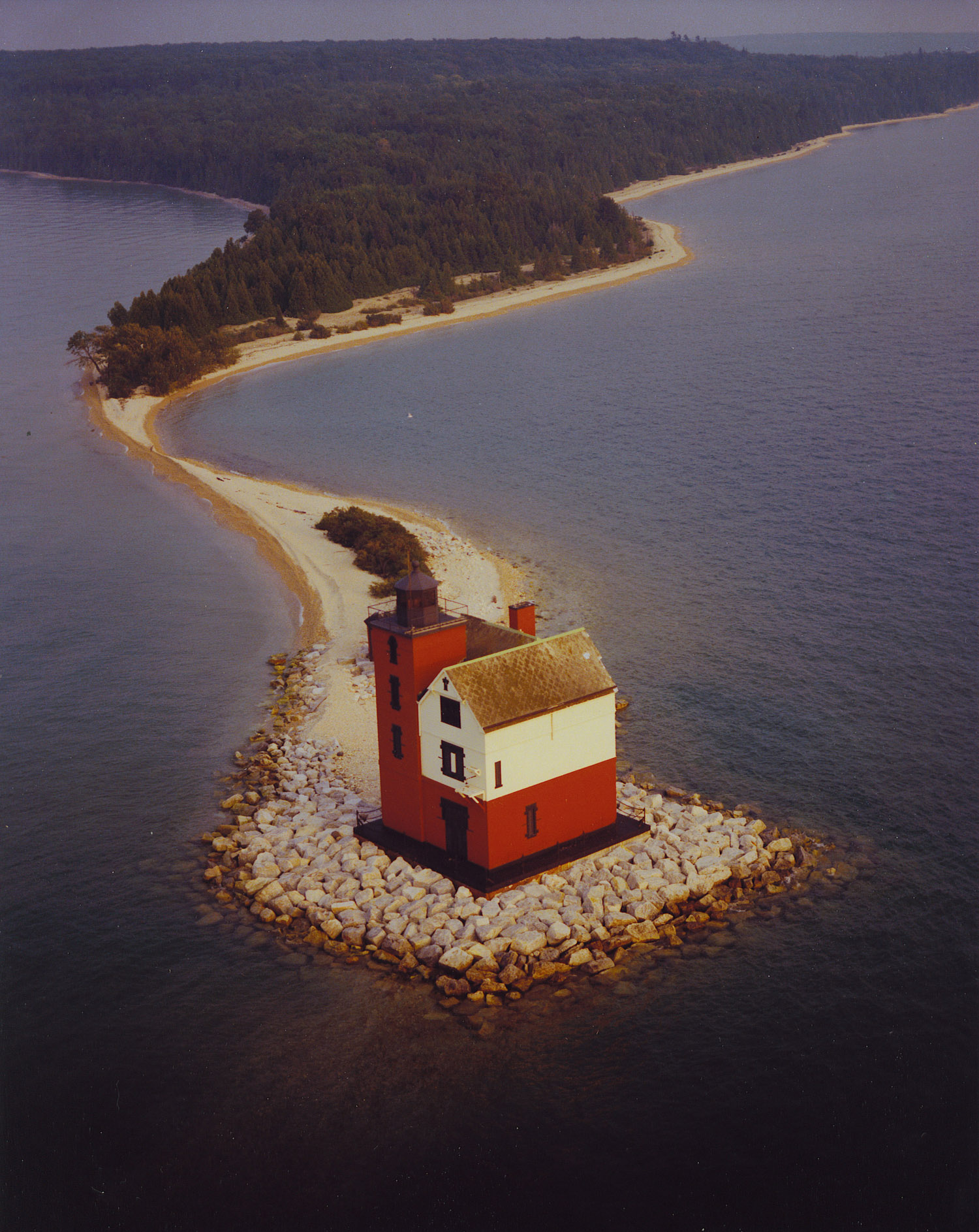
Round Island Lighthouse

Round Island is an uninhabited island in Mackinac County of the U.S. state of Michigan. It is located in the Straits of Mackinac, which connect Lake Michigan and Lake Huron. The Native Americans call the island "Nissawinagong."

The island has an area of 378 acres (153 ha). Almost the entire island comprises the Round Island Wilderness Area within the Hiawatha National Forest. The island is nominally part of the City of Mackinac Island, Michigan, but is in fact overseen by the U.S. Forest Service. Round Island is adjacent to, and to some extent protects the harbor of, nearby Mackinac Island, and the estimated 900,000 tourists who visit Mackinac Island annually by ferryboat pass close by Round Island on their journeys. To Round Island's southeast lies the inhabited island of Bois Blanc.

== Description ==
Ecologically, Round Island contains beach/marshy shore, conifer forest, and hardwood forest. Bordering a shoreline of cobblestones, cobblestones/sand, and sandy beach is a conifer forest that includes northern whitecedar, white spruce, and white pine. On the Island's height is a mature beech-maple forest featuring sugar maple, paper birch, and some American beech, although the beech population was hard-hit by disease in the 21st century.

The sole building on the island (and sole land parcel that is not designated wilderness) is the Round Island Light, a lighthouse constructed in 1895. The ship channel between Mackinac Island and Round Island, lighted by Round Island Light, is called Round Island Channel. Christopher Reeve and Jane Seymour can be seen sitting near the lighthouse in the 1980 movie Somewhere in Time which was filmed primarily on Mackinac Island. The lighthouse is off limits to anyone who may visit the island.

While it is rare for Round Island to see any visitors, there is a small cove on the Island's northeast shore that attracts occasional inhabitants of Mackinac Island who sail to the harbor's sandy beach for a secluded, quiet visit. (The beaches of Mackinac Island are generally rocky.)
