= Round Island Passage Light =

Lighthouse in Michigan, United States

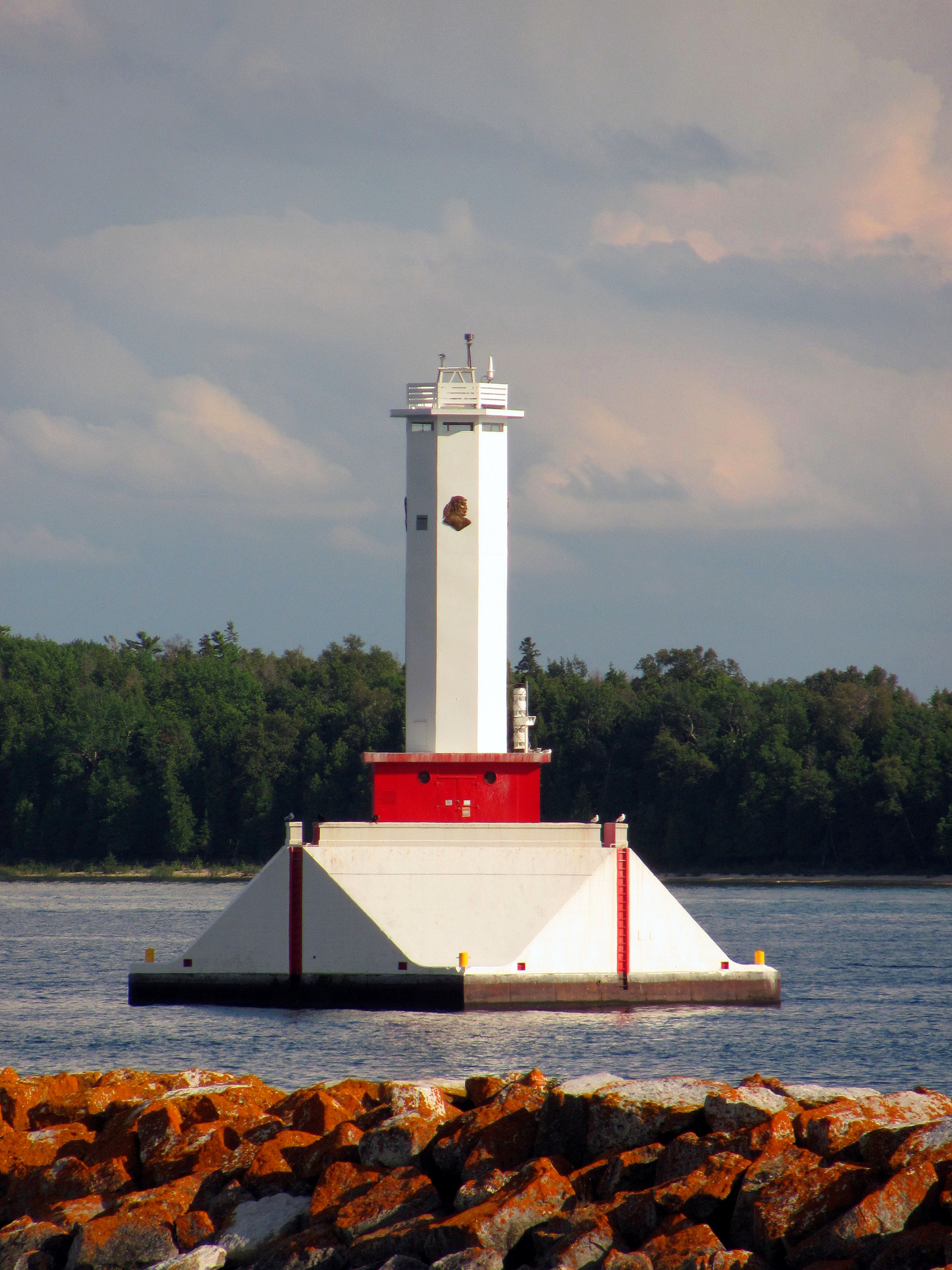
- Location: Mackinac Island, Mackinac County, United States
- Coordinates: 45°50′36″N 84°36′54″W

Tower
- Constructed: 1947
- Construction: reinforced concrete (tower), box crib (foundation)
- Automated: 1973
- Height: 18 m (59 ft)
- Shape: octagon
- Markings: White (tower), Stripe (red)
- Heritage: National Register of Historic Places listed place
- Fog signal: Horn: On request - 1 every 30s
- Racon: X

Light
- First lit: 1948
- Focal height: 22 m (72 ft)
- Lens: Sealed beam (original), 7.5-inch (190 mm) (current)
- Range: 14 nmi (26 km; 16 mi)
- Characteristic: Fl R 4s
- Round Island Passage Light
- U.S. National Register of Historic Places
- Round Island Passage Light is SW of the southern end of the west breakwater guarding Haldimand Bay.
- MPS: Light Stations of the United States MPS
- NRHP reference No.: 13000583
- Added to NRHP: August 7, 2013

Round Island Passage Light is an automated, unmanned lighthouse located in the Round Island Channel in the Straits of Mackinac, Michigan. The channel is a branch of Lake Huron.

== History ==
The Round Island Lighthouse was constructed in 1895 to mark the southern side of the Round Island Channel. In 1936, the United States Coast Guard developed plans to construct another lighthouse, 1000 feet south of Mackinac Island, to mark the northern side of the navigable channel. However, World War II intervened, and construction was delayed. In the interim, a buoy with a radio beacon was moored near the site. The Coast Guard began construction on the Round Island Passage Light in 1947, and finished in 1948. Construction included building a control house at the southern tip on Mackinac Island, and running power cables underwater to the light. The lighthouse was equipped with a beacon light, fog signal, and radiobeacon. The light flashed a green signal from an array of sealed beam lamps mounted at the top of the light tower.

The Passage Light was one of the last lights to be constructed on the Great Lakes. The light was built at the same time that the 1895 lighthouse was deactivated. In 1959, the lighthouse's beacon characteristic was changed from green to a flashing red light, and the radiobeacon distance-finding system was deactivated in 1962. In 1968 the formerly all-white light was given a red-painted base on a white pier. In 1973 the light was automated, and the steel antenna tower was removed in the early 2000s.

In 1996, the Round Island Light was relighted as a private aid to navigation, and as of 2017 both lights currently mark the channel. On August 7, 2013, the light was listed on the National Register of Historic Places. In the same year, the General Services Administration announced that Round Island Passage Lighthouse was not needed by the Coast Guard. The light was sold at auction in 2014 for $65,500.

== Description ==
The Round Island Passage Light is constructed on a timber crib foundation which is 56 feet square. The timber crib has perimeter cells filled with concrete, and internal cells filled with rock. Atop the crib is a concrete superstructure with a 41-foot square reinforced concrete deck. The superstructure is octagonal, with four vertical and four sloping sides.

Atop the tower's concrete deck is a red-painted 20 foot square enclosure, eleven feet high, constructed of steel plates. The enclosure can be entered through a nine-foot wide door on one side. Above the enclosure is a five-story octagonal steel tower, 41-1/2 feet high and 12 feet across. Each side of the tower contains a four-foot bronze relief Indian head, commemorating the fact that Mackinac Island was a sacred spot for Native American tribes. On the interior, ladders reach from each story to higher ones. The light originally had a 47-foot steel antenna atop the tower, but it was removed in the early 2000s.

== See also ==
- National Register of Historic Places listings in Mackinac County, Michigan
