= Michilimackinac =

U.S. historical region in the area of Michigan, Straits of Mackinac

Coordinates: 45.8679°N 84.6285°W

Michilimackinac (/ˌmɪʃələˈmækənɔː/ MISH-ə-lə-MAK-ə-naw) is derived from an Ottawa-Ojibwe name for present-day Mackinac Island and the region around the Straits of Mackinac between Lake Huron and Lake Michigan. Early settlers of North America applied the term to the entire region along Lakes Huron, Michigan, and Superior. Today it is considered to be mostly within the boundaries of Michigan. Michilimackinac was the original name for Mackinac Island and Mackinac County.

== History ==
=== Woodland period ===
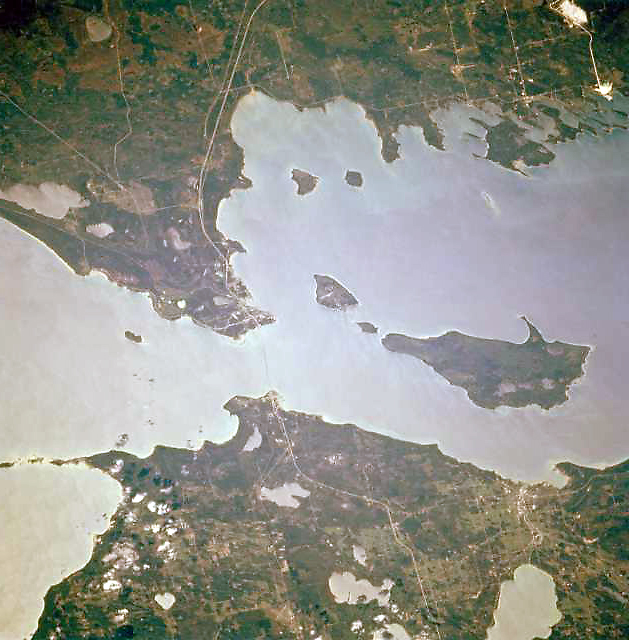
Overhead view of the Straits of Mackinac linking Lakes Michigan (left) and Huron (right)

Pottery first appears during Woodland period in the style of the Laurel complex. The people of the area engaged in long-distance trade, likely as part of the Hopewell tradition.

=== Anishinaabe and the French ===
The Straits of Mackinac linking Lakes Michigan and Huron was a strategic area controlling movement between the two lakes and much of the pays d'en haut. It was controlled by Algonquian Anishinaabe nations including the Ojibwe and the Odawa. The area was known to the Odawa as Michilimackinac, meaning "Big Turtle". For these people, "Michilimackinac is literally the birthplace and centre of the world" and is where the Three Fires Confederacy took place.

The Anishinaabe had good relations with the Iroquoian-speaking Wendat, who were the first group to establish relations with New France after Samuel de Champlain's arrival in 1608. The Anishinaabe used these relations to trade indirectly with the French. The French were the first Europeans to explore the area, beginning in 1612. After the fall of Huronia in the Beaver Wars, the Anishinaabe began to trade directly with the French and started inviting French settlers to Michilimackinac.

In 1654, a large Haudenosaunee force was attacked by the Odawa and Ojibwe as they tried to cross the Straits of Mackinac. In 1658, the Haudenosaunee attacked again but were defeated by the Anishinaabe. The French established trading posts and Jesuit Catholic missions. One of the oldest missions, St. Ignace Mission, was located on the north side of the strait at Point Iroquois near present-day St. Ignace, Michigan. This mission was established in 1671 by the Jesuit Father Jacques Marquette.

In 1683, under pressure from the Odawa, the French established a presence on the north side of the straits at the St. Ignace Mission in an alliance with the Anishinaabe against the Haudenosaunee. Between 1670 and 1700, Michilimackinac flourished and became one of the central sites of the fur trade. French visitors reported vast summer markets taking place along the shorelines each year. Both natives and newcomers flocked to take advantage. Hundreds of Native Americans from around Lakes Michigan and Superior would make the voyage to the straits to meet French traders coming up from the St. Lawrence. In the words of a later French traveler, Michilimackinac became "the landing place and refuge of all the savages who trade their peltries." Consequently, Michilimackinac rapidly became the "general meeting-place for all the French who go to trade with stranger tribes."

In 1715, the French established Fort Michilimackinac on the south side of the strait. The fort became a major trading post, attracting Native Americans from throughout the northern Great Lakes. After Great Britain defeated France in the French and Indian War, their colonial forces took over the fort and territory.

In 1763 Fort Michilimackinac fell to an Ojibwe attack during Pontiac's War. It was reoccupied by the British in September 1764. In 1780, during the American Revolution, British commandant Patrick Sinclair moved the British trading and military post to Mackinac Island, which was held by the British for some time, and abandoned Fort Michilimackinac after the move. After the Americans gained independence in the Revolutionary War, this site became part of a territory of the United States. The fort saw its only military action on 17 July 1812 when Lieutenant Porter Hanks bloodlessly surrendered it to the British during the War of 1812.

== European presence ==
Term start	Term end	Commander Name	Picture	Forts and missions in the Michilimackinac area	Missionaries, explorers, and tribal leaders in the Michilimackinac area	Regional Governor (dates)
1671	1683	New France did not have a post yet.		St. Ignace Mission	Jacques Marquette (1671–1675), Louis Jolliet (1673–1674), Father Henri Nouvel, "superior of the Otawa mission" (1672–1680 with a two-year break in 1678-1679, and again from 1688 to 1695.)	Governor General of New France -- Daniel de Rémy de Courcelle (1665–1672), Louis de Buade de Frontenac (1672–1682), Joseph-Antoine de La Barre (1682–1685)
1683	1690	Olivier Morel de La Durantaye		St. Ignace Mission	Father Henri Nouvel "superior of the Otawa mission"	Joseph-Antoine de La Barre (1682–1685), Jacques-René de Brisay de Denonville, Marquis de Denonville (1685-1689)
1690?	1691?	François de la Forêt (Tonty 2nd in command)		St. Ignace Mission	Father Henri Nouvel "superior of the Otawa mission"	Jacques-René de Brisay de Denonville, Marquis de Denonville (1685-1689)
1691?	1694	Louis de La Porte de Louvigné		Fort de Buade and St. Ignace Mission	Nicolas Perrot (1690–???)	Louis de Buade de Frontenac (second term) (1689–1698)
1694	1696	Antoine de la Mothe Cadillac		Fort de Buade and St. Ignace Mission (abandoned by 1705)	Étienne de Carheil 1686–1702	Louis de Buade de Frontenac (second term) (1689–1698)
1696	1714	(Post abandoned by New France in favor of Detroit)		St. Ignace Mission	Father Étienne de Carheil 1686–1702. Kondiaronk "Le Rat" / Chief of the Hurons. Father Joseph Marest (1700–1714)	Louis-Hector de Callière (1698–1703) Philippe de Rigaud Vaudreuil (1703 to 1725)
1715		Constant le Marchand de Lignery		Fort Michilimackinac		Philippe de Rigaud Vaudreuil (1703–1725)
1722	1725	Constant le Marchand de Lignery		Fort Michilimackinac		Philippe de Rigaud Vaudreuil (1703–1725), Charles le Moyne de Longueuil, Baron de Longueuil (acting governor 1726)
1729	???	Jacques-Charles Renaud Dubuisson		Fort Michilimackinac		Charles de la Boische, Marquis de Beauharnois (1725–1747)
1730	1733	Jacques Testard de Montigny		Fort Michilimackinac		Charles de la Boische, Marquis de Beauharnois (1725–1747)
1738	1742	Pierre Joseph Céloron de Blainville		Fort Michilimackinac		Charles de la Boische, Marquis de Beauharnois (1725–1747)
1744	1744	Monsier de Vivchevet		Fort Michilimackinac		Charles de la Boische, Marquis de Beauharnois (1725–1747)
1745	1745	Louis de la Corne, Chevalier de la Corne		Fort Michilimackinac		Charles de la Boische, Marquis de Beauharnois (1725–1747)
1745	1747	Nicolas-Joseph de Noyelles de Fleurimont		Fort Michilimackinac		Charles de la Boische, Marquis de Beauharnois (1725–1747)
1748	1750	Jacques Legardeur de Saint-Pierre		Fort Michilimackinac		Roland-Michel Barrin de La Galissonière (1747–1749)
1750	1750	Monsieuer Duplessis Faber		Fort Michilimackinac		Jacques-Pierre de Taffanel de la Jonquière, Marquis de la Jonquière (1749–1752)
1753	1753	Louis Liénard de Beaujeu de Villemonde		Fort Michilimackinac		Michel-Ange Duquesne de Menneville (1752–1755)
1754	1754	Monsieur Herbin		Fort Michilimackinac		Michel-Ange Duquesne de Menneville (1752–1755)
