= Round Island Channel =

Coordinates: 45.8409°N 84.6154°W

The Round Island Channel is a navigable Lake Huron waterway located between Mackinac Island and Round Island in the Straits of Mackinac. It forms a key link in the lake freighter route between Lake Superior and Lake Michigan, on which millions of tons of taconite iron ore are shipped annually. The channel also provides access to the harbor of Mackinac Island, Michigan, and is used by commercial ferryboats delivering passengers to the small island city.

== In history ==
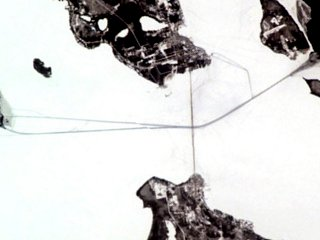
Satellite photograph of icebreaker paths for shipping, including the Round Island Channel on the upper right-hand corner of the image.

The Round Island Channel has been in active use since before the arrival of European explorers. With the construction of Fort Mackinac in 1780–1781, the channel became a link in the logistics chain operated by the British Army to supply the fort.

With the discovery of significant hematite mines in northern Minnesota in the late 1800s, and the construction of steel mills shortly after 1900 along the shores of southern Lake Michigan in and around Gary, Indiana, the Round Island Channel became an essential element in one of the most significant commodity supply pipelines of the Great Lakes.

The Round Island Channel is lit by Round Island Light, an 1895 lighthouse, and by Round Island Passage Light, a 1948 light which has a Racon.

The channel is maintained to a project depth of 30 feet (9.1 meters) in line with U.S.-Canadian agreements governing the operation of Great Lakes navigable waterways and the St. Lawrence Seaway. This depth is sufficient to provide safe water for lake freighters as massive as 1,000 feet (300 m) long. Buoys and the lights delineate the channel today.

== In sports ==
The Round Island Channel forms the ending points of the annual Chicago Yacht Club Race to Mackinac and its counterpart, the Port Huron to Mackinac Race. In both races, sail-powered yachts race from the southern ends of Lake Michigan and Lake Huron, respectively, to the Round Island Channel.
