= Sacred Heart-Gros Cap Church =

- U.S. National Register of Historic Places
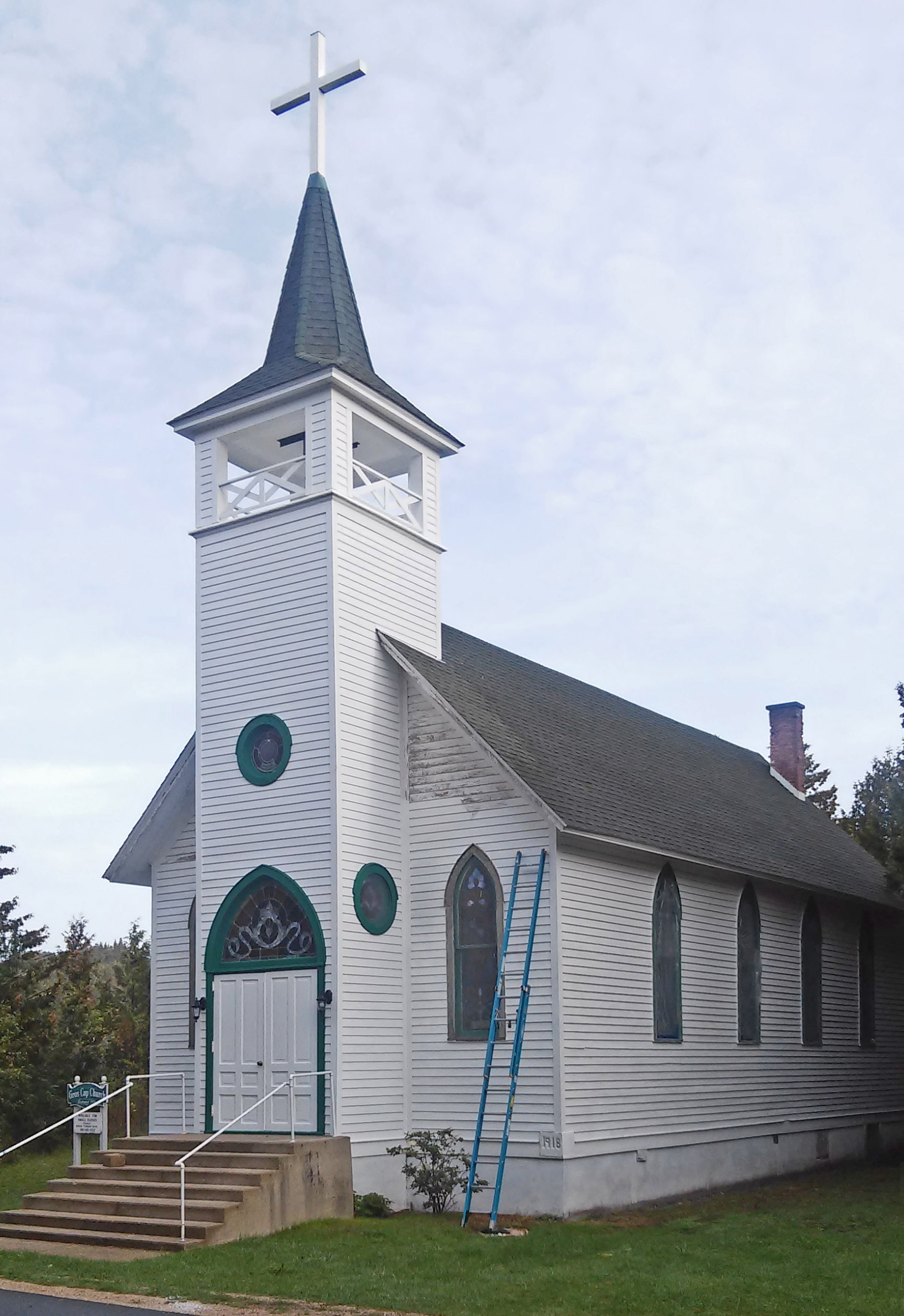

- Location within Michigan Location within the United States
- Interactive map
- Location: N903 Gros Cap Rd. Moran Township, Michigan
- Coordinates: 45°52′25″N 84°49′54″W
- Built: 1918-1919
- NRHP reference No.: 16000217
- Added to NRHP: May 3, 2016

The Sacred Heart-Gros Cap Church is a church located at N903 Gros Cap Road in Moran Township, Michigan. It was listed on the National Register of Historic Places in 2016.

== History ==
The area around what is now the small community of Gros Cap, Michigan was likely uninhabited until about 1840. A small settlement was established around that time, and slowly grew throughout the nineteenth century, populated substantially by fishermen. By 1892 Gros Cap was large enough for a post office. However, Catholic residents of Gros Cap were served by the mission in St. Ignace, reached primarily by water, and occasional visits from the mission's priest who held services in the local township hall.

In 1917, Gros Cap residents met to raise funds for the construction of a church in the settlement. Land was donated, and construction commenced in 1918. Construction was completed in 1919. The church served as a mission of the St. Ignace church, and was attended to by the St. Ignace priest, until 1967 when the church was closed. In 1979, the Diocese of Marquette gave Moran Township the church, on condition the township preserve the church as a historic landmark. The township renovated the building.

== Description ==
The Gros Cap church is a rectangular gabled wood-frame structure covered with clapboard painted white. The front facade is symmetric, with a double-door center entrance in a projecting square tower. The tower has a pointed-arch stained glass window above the doors, and three small circular windows, one in each side of the tower, above. The tower culminates in an eight-sided point with a cross atop. Two pointed-arch lancet windows filled with stained glass flank the tower; eight similar windows line each side of the church. Windows are surrounded by green wood trim. The interior contains a wooden Gothic altar and altarpiece, altar rail, pews, confessional, and rear gallery.
