= Louis de La Porte de Louvigny =

Louis de La Porte de Louvigny (c. 1662–27 August 1725) was a military officer in France and Canada, who fought during the French and Indian wars.

== Early life ==
Louis de La Porte de Louvigny was born in Paris or Le Mans around 1662. He was the son of Jean de La Porte and Françoise Faucrolle (or Foucrelle) and came from the wealthy and noble De La Porte family in Laval, Mayenne. He married Marie Nolan in Quebec on 26 October 1684, which resulted in three daughters and one son. Six other children died in their infancy.

== Military career ==
Louvigny had served as a subordinate officer in the Regiment of Navarre for six years, before coming to New France in 1683. After several expeditions against the Iroquois, Governor De Denonville sent him on a mission to Hudson Bay in 1688. In 1689, Denonville's successor Frontenac ordered De Louvigny to reinforce Michilimackinac with 170 men and relieve its commander, Morel de La Durantaye. De Louvigny would stay in command there until 1694.

De Louvigny became commanding officer of Fort Frontenac on 7 November 1699, but was arrested the following winter for trading in fur with the Iroquois, which had been forbidden by an edict in 1696. However, instead of a court-martial, De Louvigny managed to be tried by the Sovereign Council. The Council sent him back to France, where the king stripped him from his position as major of Trois-Rivières. However, he returned soon after in 1703 as major of Quebec.

After he solved an incident involving several native tribes, De Louvigny was granted a coveted cross in the Order of Saint Louis in 1708. Having become the king's lieutenant in 1716, De Louvigny commanded a successful campaign to the Fox Indian stronghold at Baie-des-Puants. The French then nicknamed the place "Hill of the Dead" (see also: Butte des Morts, Wisconsin) In 1720, he was made commander-in-chief of the Pays d'en Haut.

== Death ==
On a return voyage from France, the Chameau hit a reef near Cape Breton and sank on 27 August 1725. None of the passengers survived, including De Louvigny.
