= Hessel School =

- U.S. National Register of Historic Places
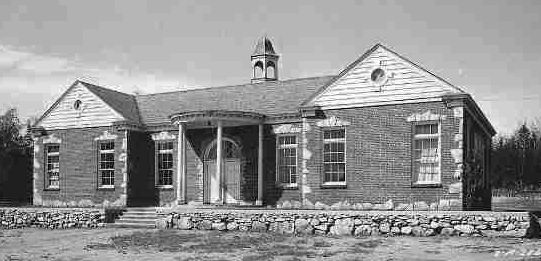
- Hessel School, c. 1940

- Location within Michigan Location within the United States
- Interactive map
- Location: 3206 West Cedar St. Hessel, Michigan
- Coordinates: 46°0′21″N 84°25′48″W
- Built: 1937
- Architect: G. Harold Thompson
- Architectural style: Colonial Revival vernacular
- NRHP reference No.: 100004234
- Added to NRHP: August 5, 2019

The Hessel School is a former school building located at 3206 West Cedar Street in Hessel, Michigan. It is now a community center. It was listed on the National Register of Historic Places in 2019.

== History ==
The area around Hessel was first settled by Europeans in the 1880s. The first school, located just behind the location of the present building, was constructed in 1887. By the 1930s, this school was outdated, and in 1936, a new school was funded through the Works Progress Administration (WPA). The WPA chose architect G. Harold Thompson from Mullett Lake, Michigan to design the new school. Construction began in early 1937, and the new school opened for classes in September 1938, with the auditorium section of the building opened in December. The school served students from grades K-5. After fifth grade, students transferred to the nearby Cedarville School, or, in the case of many Native American children, to the Holy Childhood Indian boarding school in Harbor Springs.

In 1958, the Cedarville School was expanded, and all elementary education was transferred to that location. The Hessel School was closed. The building remained empty until 1964, when the school district sold it to Northern Michigan Publishing Company. The company closed in the late 1960s, after which the building was vacant for a time. In 1972, it was sold to Azor D. Sheffield, who remodeled it into a residence. Azor Sheffield died in 2013, and his daughters inherited the property. They listed it for sale in 2014.

In 2015, the Sheffield family sold the building to the Hessel School House Corporation, an organization of mostly former Hessel School students or their descendants. The group rehabilitated the building, completing work in 2016. The school now serves as a community center, with arts and nature education, markets, and community and private events.

== Description ==
The Hessel School is the one-story reddish brick Colonial Revival elementary school building with irregular native limestone detail. The limestone is used as quoins at all corners, and as lintels over the windows and doors. The building is symmetrical, with the main spaced forming an I-shaped footprint. Two small wings extend from the rear of the building at the center. The building has gable roofs, with a small hexagonal central bell tower. The front of the building rests on a concrete slab, while the rear has a basement underneath. The main facade has a central entry covered with a semicircular portico, supported by two Tuscan columns. The entry is flanked by two six over six double hung windows, with a three-pane transom above. The other windows in the building are similar. At each end of the building, the classroom wings project forward. Each contains two windows near the corners. The gable ends above are white-painted wood clapboard are with cornice returns and circular roof vents.

The interior of the building contains a central auditorium with two classrooms, one on each side. The main central entrance opens into a vestibule, which continues into the central auditorium space. A stage is located at the rear wall of the auditorium. Off the auditorium are doors opening to the classrooms on each side, and to restrooms.
