= Lasanen Site =

Archaeological site in Michigan, United States

- U.S. National Register of Historic Places
- Location within Michigan Location within the United States
- Location: Overlooking East Moran Bay, St. Ignace, Michigan
- Coordinates: 45°52′0″N 84°44′0″W
- Area: less than one acre
- NRHP reference No.: 71000412
- Added to NRHP: May 6, 1971

The Lasanen Site, designated 20MA21, is an archaeological site located in St. Ignace, Michigan. It was listed on the National Register of Historic Places in 1971.

== Description ==
The Lasanen Site is located within the city of St. Ignace, on what was once a beach ridge above the Straits of Mackinac. The site is a burial ground associated with the Haudenosaunee culture. Nineteen small burial pits, located in an area approximately 100 feet (30 m) by 50 feet (15 m), were identified at the site. Five more burial pits were found on adjacent property.

== History ==
The Lasanen Site was discovered in 1966, when a private landowner, Dr. W. C. Lasanen, unearthed human remains while excavating to construct a foundation. Lasanen notified the Mackinac Island State Park Commission, and urgent salvage excavations were undertaken to recover the exposed human burials. Later in 1966, C. E. Cleland from Michigan State University, along with some students, undertook further excavations at the site. These excavations continued into 1967.

The details unearthed at the burials are consistent with those witnessed and described by Antoine Laumet Cadillac in 1694–97, and may be the same.
