= Round Island Light (Straits of Mackinac) =

Lighthouse in Michigan, United States

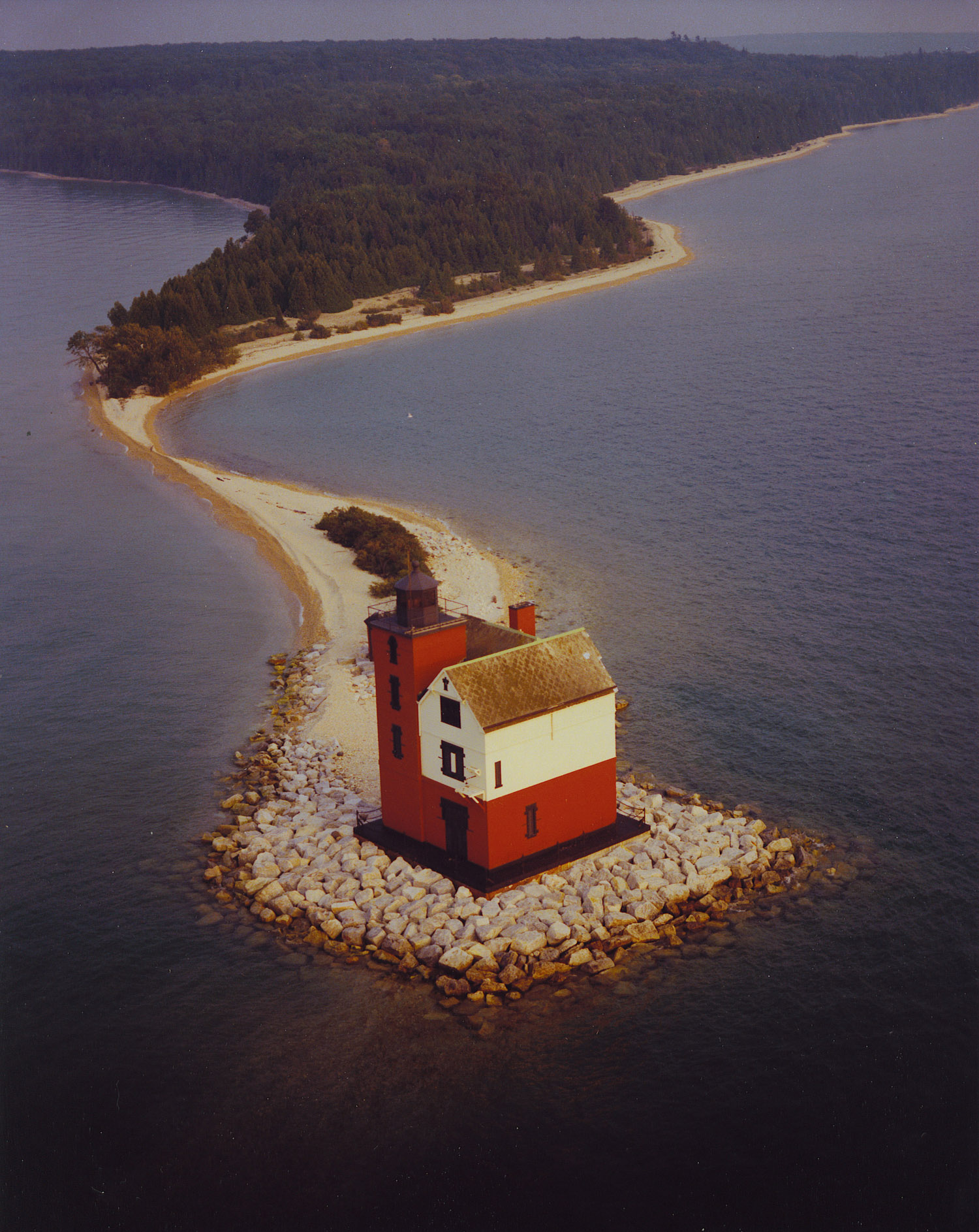
- Location: Mackinac County, Michigan
- Coordinates: 45°50′13.8″N 84°36′59.7″W

Tower
- Constructed: 1895
- Foundation: Concrete pier
- Construction: Brick
- Automated: 1924
- Height: 57 feet (17 m)
- Shape: Square
- Markings: red w/ black lantern, trim & attached house w/ red lower & cream upper
- Heritage: National Register of Historic Places listed place

Light
- First lit: 1895
- Deactivated: 1947
- Focal height: 53 feet (16 m)
- Lens: Fourth Order Fresnel Lens (original), 12-inch (300 mm) Tideland signal ML-300 acrylic optic (current)
- Range: 16 nautical miles; 29 kilometres (18 mi)
- Characteristic: Fl W 10 seconds
- Round Island Lighthouse
- U.S. National Register of Historic Places
- Michigan State Historic Site
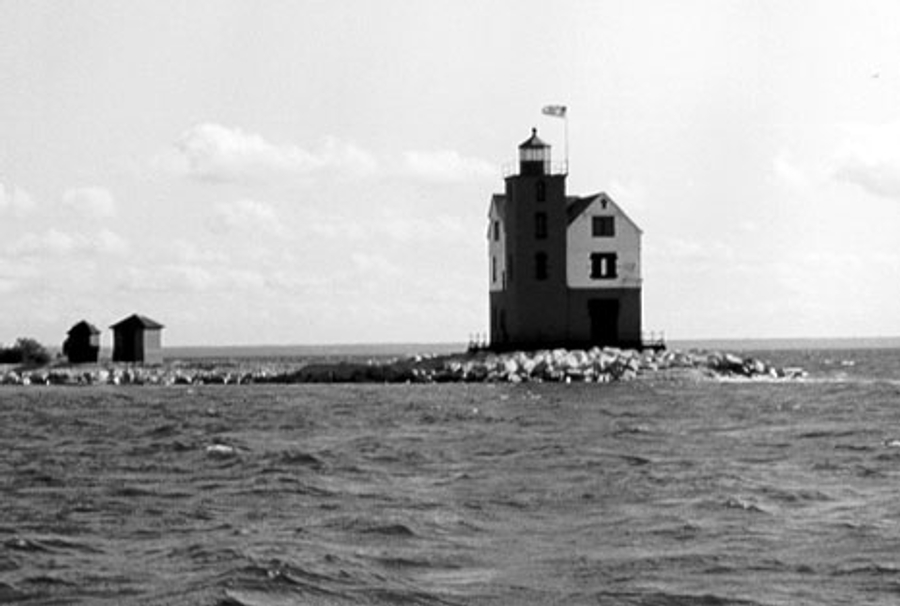
- U.S. Coast Guard archive photo
- Nearest city: Mackinac Island, Michigan
- Area: 0.9 acres (0.36 ha)
- NRHP reference No.: 74000994
- Added to NRHP: August 21, 1974

The Round Island Light, also known as the Old Round Island Point Lighthouse, is a lighthouse located on the west shore of Round Island in the shipping lanes of the Straits of Mackinac, which connect Lake Michigan and Lake Huron. It was deemed necessary because the island is a significant hazard to navigation in the straits, and was seen as an effective complement to the other lights in the area. Because of its color scheme and form — red stone base and wood tower — it has been likened to an old-fashioned schoolhouse. Ferries regularly pass it on their way to (and from) Mackinac Island, and it is a recognizable icon of the upper Great Lakes.

== History ==
This light is a twin of the Two Harbors Light in Minnesota. Located in Coast Guard District 9, the Round Island Light was built of painted brick in 1895; its construction was funded by a predecessor agency of the United States Coast Guard, and the structure was raised by a team led by Mackinac Island mason-carpenter Frank Rounds. The structure served as an active, manned lighthouse and fog signal from 1895 to 1947. It was abandoned in 1947 and replaced by the Round Island Passage Light, an automated light tower located in the adjacent Round Island Channel. Abandoned, the lighthouse fell prey to plunderers and vandals. The structure's deterioration was almost complete in 1972 when a storm caused a corner of the lighthouse structure to collapse.

This event spurred preservation efforts. Round Island Light was listed on the National Register of Historic Places in September 1974, and was added to the list of registered Michigan historic sites in 1978. Emergency work to stabilize the light tower structure was conducted in the 1970s, but the light tower remained gutted and inoperative. Restoration work was conducted in 1995 by the Friends of the Round Island Lighthouse and led by the Great Lakes Lighthouse Keepers Association (GLLKA), aided by Boy Scouts of America Troop 323. The work was partially funded by the state of Michigan, with the help of funds from a special license plate developed by the state to raise donations for lighthouse restoration. In 1973 rip rap was spread around the lighthouse base to help prevent more deterioration. The following year, after it was listed on the National Register of Historic Places, local fundraising efforts collected $12,000 for the project. The Advisory Council on Historic Preservation appropriated $125,000 in 1977 for the project. As a result of the success of this restoration work, the Coast Guard granted permission to relight the Round Island Light. The light was re-lit in 1996.

The original brick outhouse and oil house are still intact.

The Round Island Light is a registered Michigan historic site and is the focus of an official Michigan Historical Marker erected in 1978, Registered Site No. L0107. The text of the marker notes:

The Round Island Lighthouse, seen south of this site, was completed in 1895. Operating under the auspices of the United States Government, this facility was in continuous use for fifty-two years. It was manned by a crew of three until its beacon was replaced by an automated light in 1924. A sole caretaker occupied and operated the station from 1924 to 1947. Following the construction of a new automatic beacon near the breakwater off the south shore of Mackinac Island, the lighthouse was abandoned. The United States Forest Service now supervises the structure which is located in the Hiawatha National Forest. The lighthouse serves as a sentinel for the past, reminding visitors of the often precarious sailing and rich history of the Straits of Mackinac.

Location of the lighthouse on the tip of Round Island, south of Mackinac Island

== Getting there ==
Because Round Island is not accessible to most visitors (but it can be visited), the "Round Island Lighthouse" historical marker is located on Biddle's Point on nearby Mackinac Island, within easy view of the light tower. Photography of the light is possible if using a telephoto lens.

A private boat is the best way to see this light close up. Short of that, Sheplers Ferry Service out of Mackinaw City offers periodic lighthouse cruises in the summer season. Its "Eastbound Tour" includes passes by Round Island Light, Bois Blanc Island and Light, Poe Reef Light and Fourteen Foot Shoal Light. Schedules and rates are available from Shepler's.

Round Island Light is one of over 150 past and present lighthouses in Michigan. Michigan has more lighthouses than any other state. See Lighthouses in the United States.

== Light in popular culture ==
This lighthouse, with Biddle's Point on Mackinac Island, forms the finish line for the annual Chicago Yacht Club Race to Mackinac, run since 1898.

The lighthouse was prominently featured in the 1980 movie Somewhere in Time.

The light's location makes it "somewhat of a wilderness" but it has been depicted in sculptures and even bird houses. Because of its picturesque color and form and its location near Mackinac Island (in the path of passing ferries) and the Mackinac Bridge, it is often the subject of photographs, and drawings. Even needlepoint illustrations have been created. It has long been the ongoing subject of postcards.

A children's book written by Robert A. Lytle and Karen Howell is titled Mackinac Passage: Mystery at Round Island Light.

== See also ==
- Lighthouses in the United States
