= St. Ignace Mission =

Historic church in Michigan, United States

- U.S. National Register of Historic Places
- U.S. National Historic Landmark
- Michigan State Historic Site
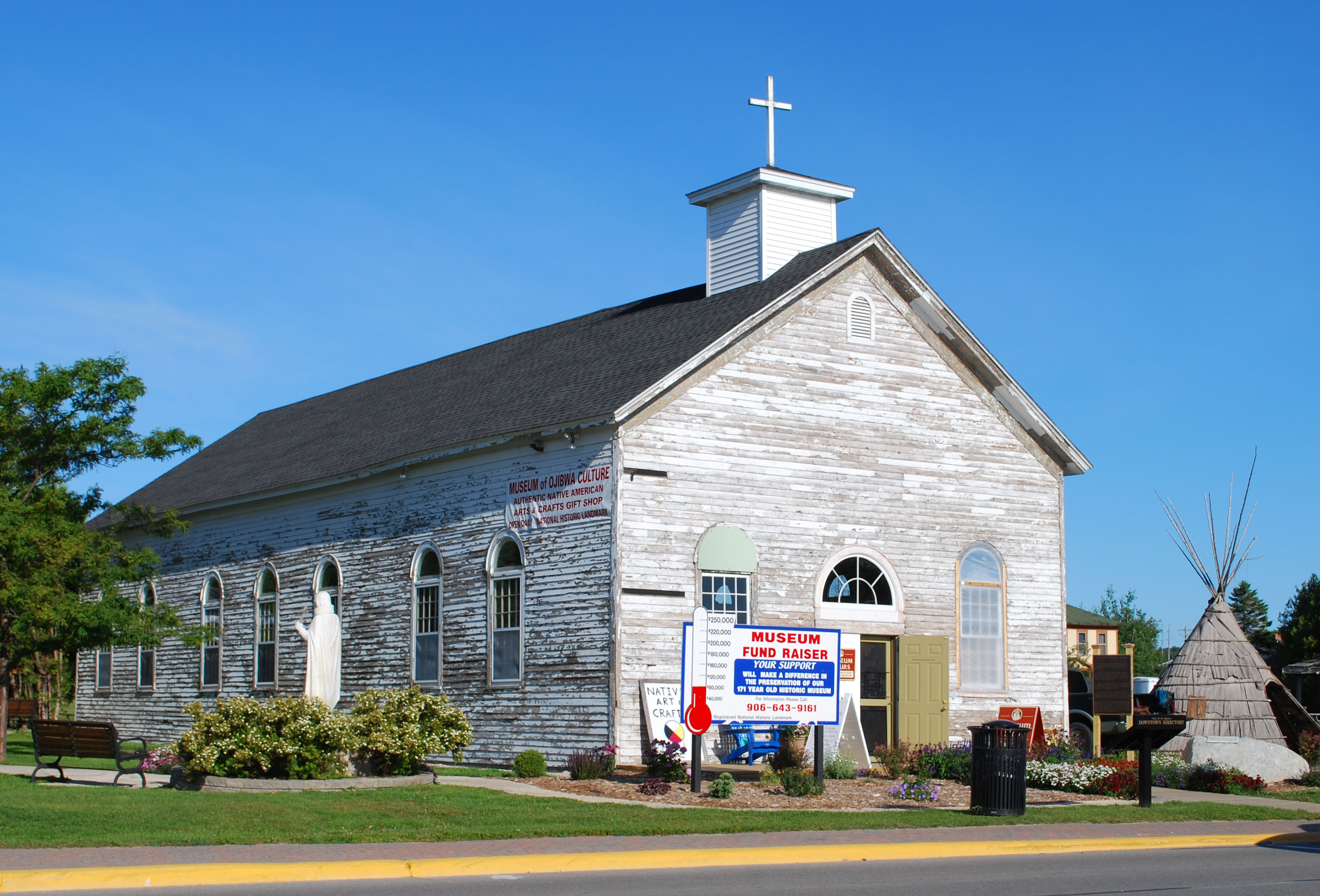
- Mission in 2009
- Interactive map
- Location: State and Marquette Sts., Marquette Park, St. Ignace, Michigan, U.S.
- Coordinates: 45°52′18″N 84°43′55″W
- Built: 1837
- NRHP reference No.: 66000398

Significant dates
- Added to NRHP: October 15, 1966
- Designated NHL: October 9, 1960
- Designated MSHS: August 23, 1956

The St. Ignace Mission (French: Mission Saint-Ignace) is located in a municipal park known as Marquette Mission Park. It was the site of a mission established by Jesuit priest, Father Jacques Marquette, and the site of his grave in 1677. A second mission was established at a different site in 1837, and the chapel was moved here in 1954. The second mission chapel is the oldest Catholic church in Michigan and Wisconsin. The St. Ignace Mission was designated a Michigan State Historic Site in 1956, and was declared a U.S. National Historic Landmarks in 1960, one of the earliest sites recognized. The mission chapel serves as the Museum of Ojibwa Culture.

== History ==
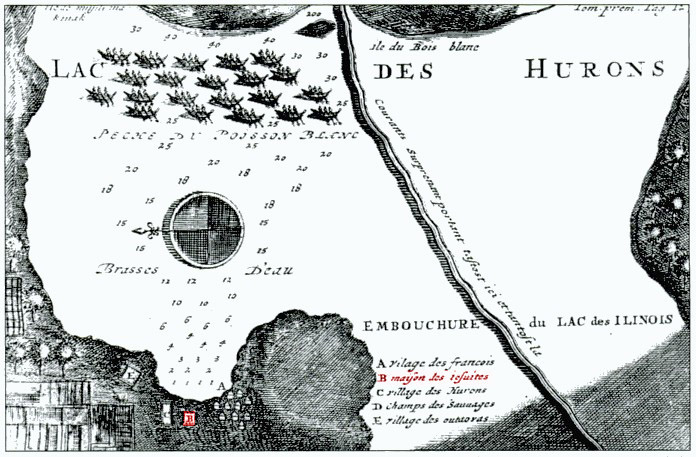
A 1717 map of St. Ignace showing the location of the Jesuit Mission (in red at lower middle-left) on East Moran Bay (north is to the left)

=== Marquette ===
In 1670, Claude Dablon established a Catholic mission on what became known as Mackinac Island. That mission was presumably destroyed, as Jacques Marquette established a French Jesuit mission at the same location in 1671.

However, in the fall of the same year, Marquette moved the mission to a location on the north shore of the Straits of Mackinac at the site of the present mission chapel. Marquette built a small log cabin at this site to serve as a chapel, and ministered to the Native Americans in the area, in particular the Petun. This people had recently settled in the area after clashes with the Haudenosaunee, as well as the French inhabitants of the Straits.

In 1674, Marquette joined Louis Jolliet on an exploration journey to trace the route of the Mississippi River. The party overwintered on the shore of Lake Michigan in what is now Chicago; however, Marquette's health had suffered on the trip, and he died in 1675 while returning to his St. Ignace mission. Marquette had expressed a desire to be buried at the mission. In 1677, his followers exhumed his remains and carried them for reinterment at St. Ignace. There, they were placed in a birch box and buried beneath the chapel.

=== Fate of the first mission ===
After Marquette's death, the mission was taken over by Father Phillip Pierson, and then Father Nouvel. A new chapel was built in approximately 1674, and by 1683 the mission was so successful and prosperous that three priests, Fathers Nicholas Potier, Enjalran, and Pierre Bailloquet, were assigned there. However, the establishment of a French garrison at St. Ignace in 1679 wound up souring relations between the French and the local population. When Antoine Laumet de La Mothe, sieur de Cadillac left the area to found Detroit in 1701, bringing many of the St. Ignace residents with him, the importance of the mission declined dramatically.

The St. Ignace mission remained open until 1705, when it was abandoned and burned by Father Étienne de Carheil. It was reopened in 1712, and operated on the north shore of the Straits until 1741, when it was relocated to the south shore. With the relocation of the mission, the exact location of Marquette's chapel was lost.

=== The second mission ===
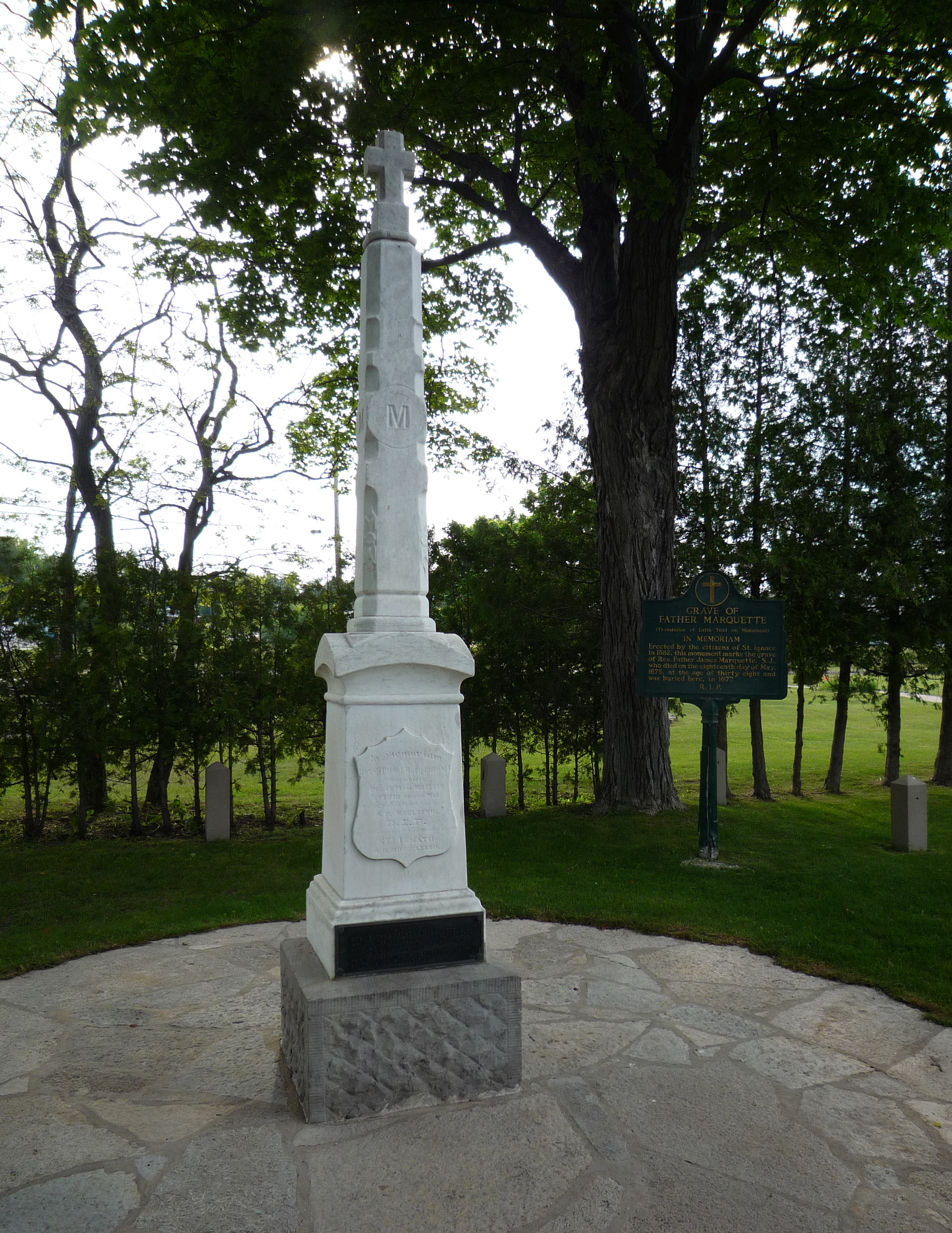
Monument marking Marquette's burial site

The area around the original mission remained nearly empty after the 1741 relocation of the mission. However, in the late 1810s and early 1820s, settlers began to trickle into the area, and by 1836 the Catholic population of the area was enough to support a small congregation.

In 1837, a second mission at St. Ignace was constructed about a mile south of the site of the first mission. Services were first held in the chapel at the end of 1837 and beginning of 1838. Services were initially conducted by priests from Mackinac Island, but in 1855 Rev. S. Carié arrived as the permanent resident clergyman. A series of priests served the congregation over the next 50 years.

In 1877, the site of the first mission was accidentally discovered. Excavations at the site confirmed that it matched the historical description of first mission. A marble statue was erected at the site in the early 20th century, and the area was designated a city park to commemorate Marquette.

In 1882-85, the second mission chapel was lengthened by adding to the front of the building. By 1901, the mission church had become dilapidated. The decision was made to construct a new church, and the congregation raised funds. A cornerstone for the new church was laid in 1904, and the church was completed in 1905. The use of the second mission chapel was discontinued in 1905, when services moved to the newly constructed St. Ignatius Loyola Church.

=== Modern times ===
The second mission chapel remained unused until 1926, when it was purchased and restored by Mrs. Catherine Chambers-Gleason. The church was adapted as a historical museum displaying artifacts from early St. Ignace, and was operated by the Knights of Columbus. In 1954, the chapel was moved from its previous location at State and Portage to the site of the first mission at State and Marquette, where it has remained. More modern archaeological investigations have been carried out at the mission site and the contemporaneous nearby Petun village, particularly in the early 1970s and 1980s.

In the late 1980s, the chapel was converted for use as the Museum of Ojibwa Culture. Exhibits focus on Ojibwa cultural values and subsistence methods, as well as the effects that the migration of Wyandot and Odawa peoples had in the area. The museum is operated by the St. Ignace Downtown Development Authority. The chapel was restored in 2008-2010, including restoration of the windows, replacement of some 5% of the clapboards, and repainting inside and out.

== Description ==
The site of the first Marquette mission is now a municipal park at the northwest corner of State and Marquette streets in St. Ignace. It is located about 300 feet (91 m) from the shore of Lake Huron. The Marquette gravesite is at the southwest corner of the park, and the second mission chapel is located on the park's east side.

The chapel is a simple one-story frame building covered with wooden clapboards and a gabled roof. It originally had a steeple, which has been replaced with a wooden cross. Double doors on the gabled end open into the sanctuary; at the opposite end is the altar, flanked by doors to the outside. The building originally had a small porch and a wing at the northeast corner, likely used as a residence.

Second mission chapel gallery
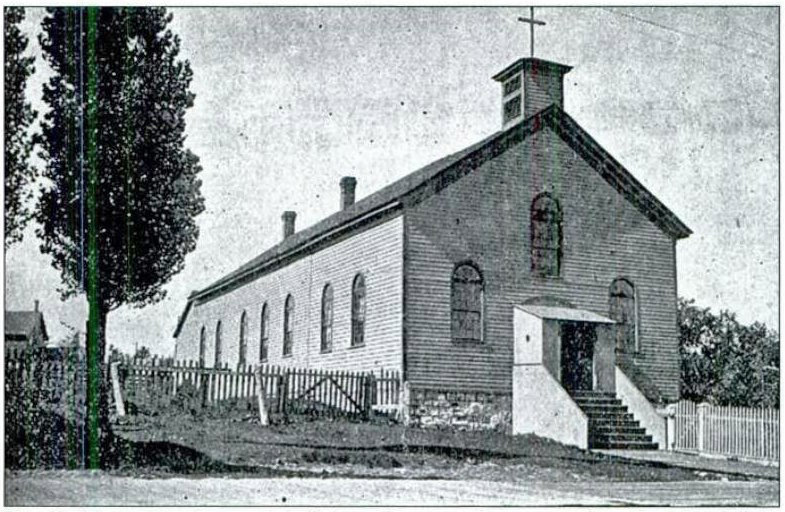
Mission c. 1900

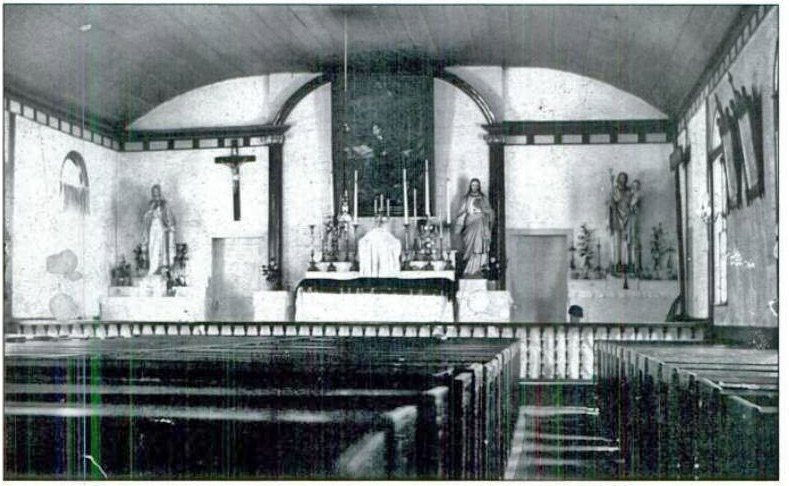
Mission interior c. 1900

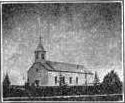
Mission c. 1900

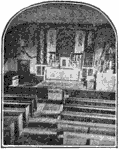
Mission interior c. 1900

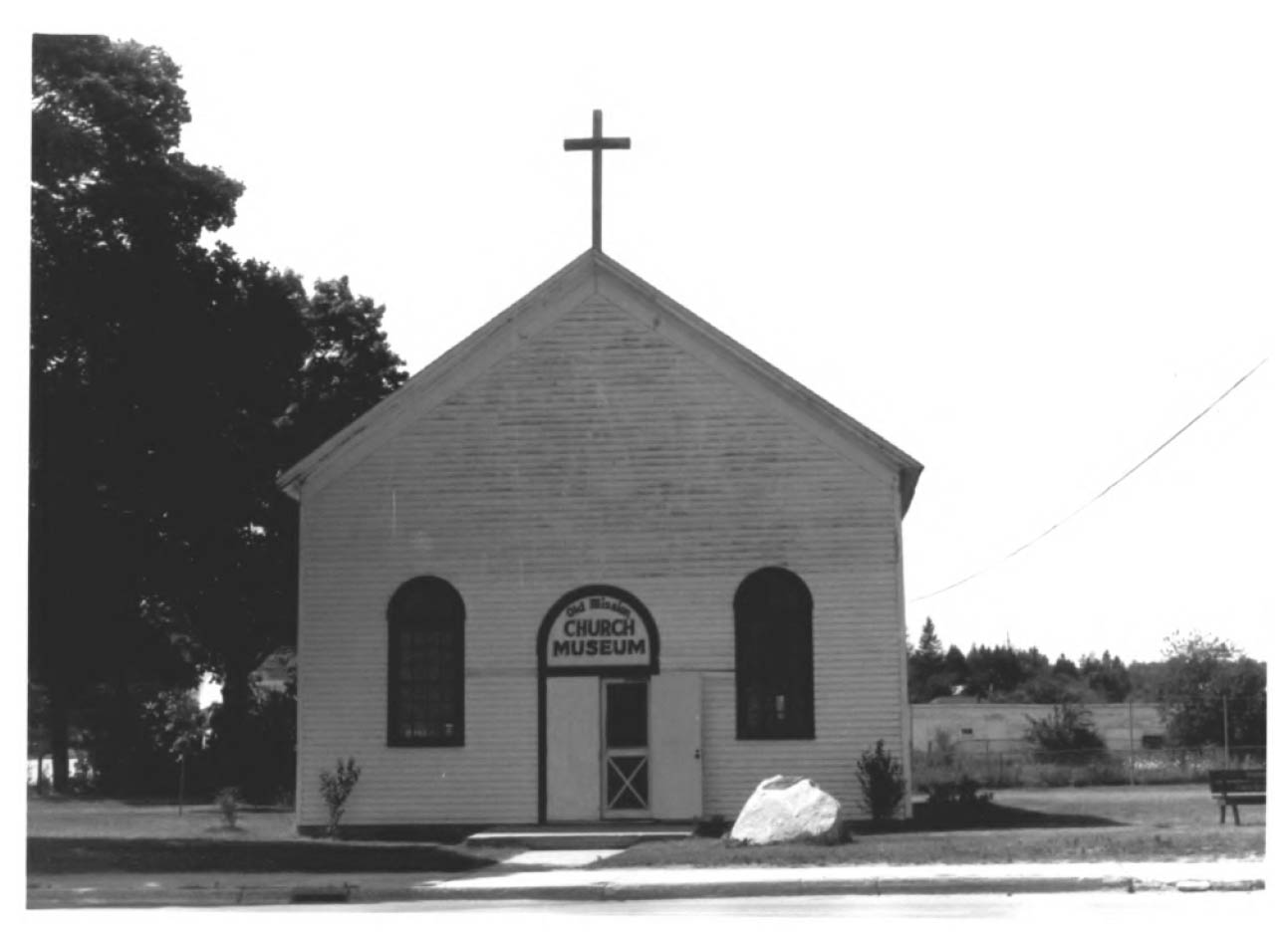
Mission c. 1960

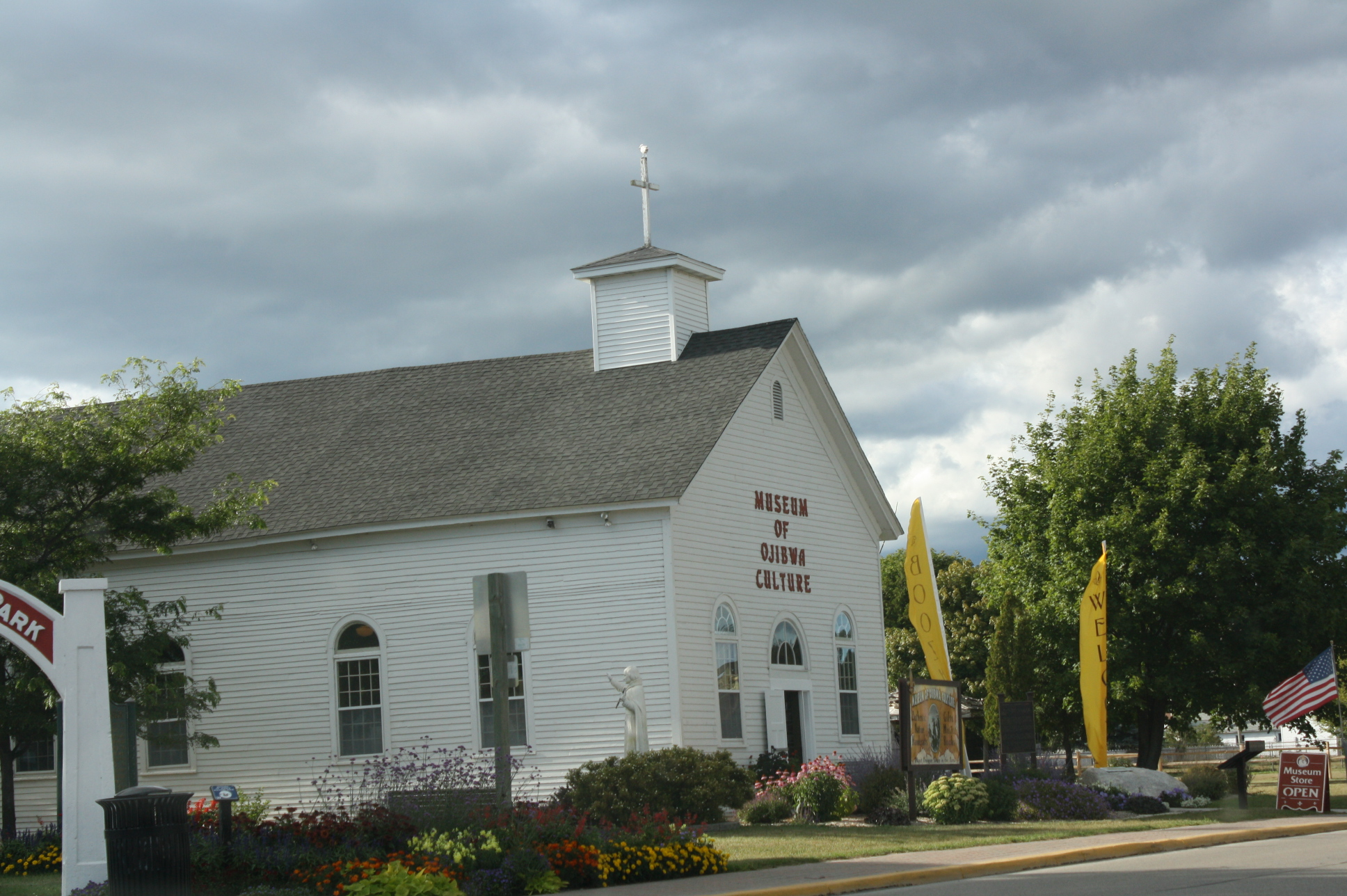
Mission in 2011 after restoration
