= Straits of Mackinac =

Strait connecting Lakes Huron and Michigan in Michigan, US

- Michilimackinac; Mackinac Strait; Strait of Mackinac; Détroit de Mackinac
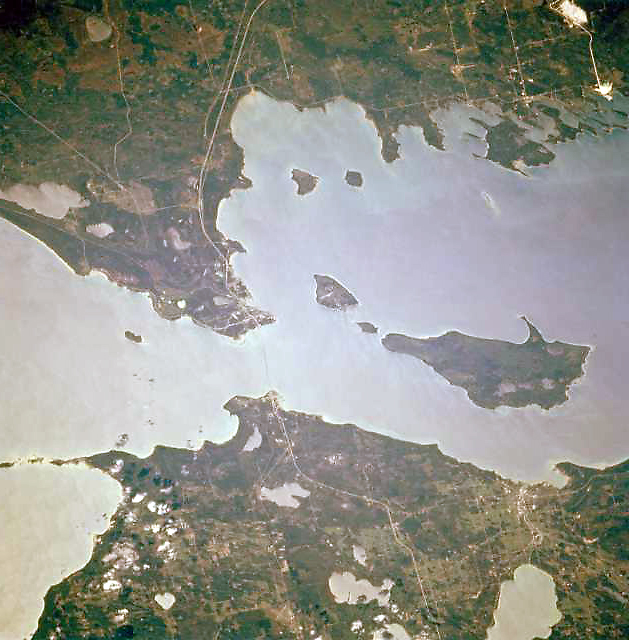
- Overhead view of the Straits of Mackinac linking Lakes Michigan (left) and Huron (right)

- Location within Michigan Location within Great Lakes Location within the United States
- Location: Lake Michigan-Lake Huron
- Coordinates: 45°48′50″N 84°45′00″W
- Type: Strait
- Etymology: Michilimackinac
- Primary inflows: Lake Michigan
- Primary outflows: Lake Huron
- Basin countries: United States
- Max. depth: 295 ft (90 m)

The Straits of Mackinac (/ˈmækənɔː/ MAK-ə-naw; French: Détroit de Mackinac) are the short waterways between the U.S. state of Michigan's Upper and Lower Peninsulas, traversed by the Mackinac Bridge. The main strait is 3 1/2 miles (5.6 kilometers) wide with a maximum depth of 295 feet (49 fathoms; 90 meters), and connects the Great Lakes of Lake Michigan and Lake Huron. Given the large size and configuration of the straits, hydrologically, the two connected lakes are one body of water, studied as Lake Michigan–Huron. Historically, the native Odawa people called the region around the Straits Michilimackinac.

Three islands form the eastern edge of the Straits of Mackinac; two are populated—Bois Blanc Island and Mackinac Island, while the third, Round Island, is uninhabited and a designated wilderness area. The Straits of Mackinac are major shipping lanes, providing passage for raw materials and finished goods and connecting, for instance, the iron mines of Minnesota to the steel mills of Gary, Indiana. Before the railroads reached Chicago from the east, most immigrants arrived in the Midwest and Great Plains by ships on the Great Lakes. The straits are five miles (8 km) wide at their narrowest point, where they are spanned by the Mackinac Bridge. Before the bridge was built, car ferries transported vehicles across the straits. Today passenger-only ferries carry people to Mackinac Island, which does not permit cars. Visitors can take their vehicles on a car ferry to Bois Blanc Island.

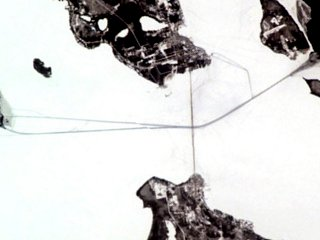
Satellite photograph of icebreaker paths through the ice in the straits. The Mackinac Bridge is the vertical line in the center, connecting the landmass of the Upper Peninsula above to lower Michigan below. The icebreaker paths run right-to-left, connecting the open water of Lake Michigan with the open water of Lake Huron between Mackinac Island and Round Island.

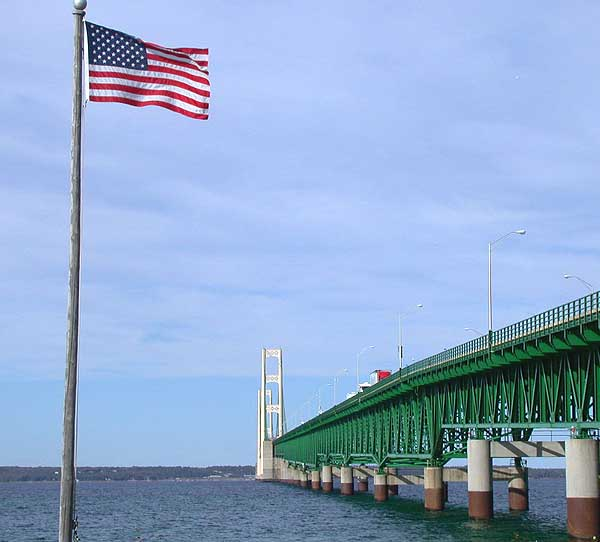
The Straits of Mackinac, spanned by the Mackinac Bridge, seen from the southern shore

The straits are shallow and narrow enough to freeze over in the winter. Navigation is ensured for year-round shipping to the Lower Great Lakes by the use of icebreakers.

The straits were an important Native American and fur trade route. The Straits of Mackinac are named after Mackinac Island. The local Ojibwe Native Americans in the Straits of Mackinac region likened the shape of the island to that of a turtle, so they named the island Mitchimakinak, meaning "Big Turtle". When the British explored the area, they shortened the name to its present form: Mackinac.

Located on the southern side of the straits is the town of Mackinaw City, the site of Fort Michilimackinac, a reconstructed French fort founded in 1715, and on the northern side is St. Ignace, site of a French Catholic mission to the Indians, founded in 1671. The eastern end of the straits was controlled by Fort Mackinac on Mackinac Island, a British colonial and early American military base and fur trade center, founded in 1781.

== History ==
A French Catholic mission to the Indians was founded at St. Ignace in 1671. In 1715, Fort Michilimackinac was built by the French on the south end of the straits' narrows. Michilimackinac was replaced in 1781 by a British fort, Fort Mackinac, on Mackinac Island.

Enbridge Line 5 was built in 1953 as an extension of the 1,150-mile (1,850 km) Interprovincial Pipe Line Company line west of the iconic Mackinac Bridge, bringing oil from Alberta to Lake Superior. On December 12, 2018, Michigan Governor Rick Snyder signed a bill establishing the Mackinac Straits Corridor Authority and appointed its first members.

== Today ==
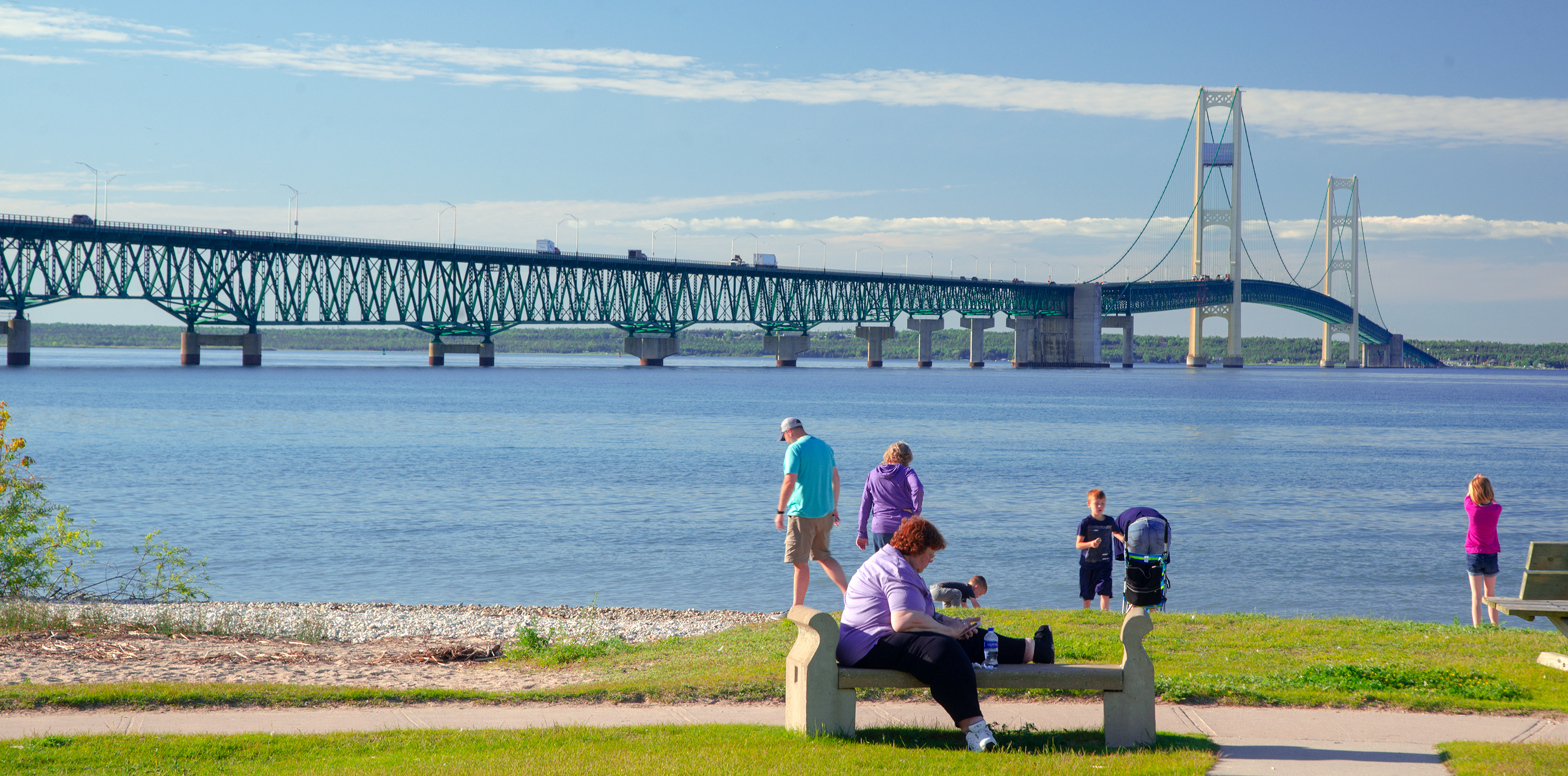
Mackinac Bridge from Mackinaw City

The straits are patrolled by a detachment of the United States Coast Guard based at Graham Point, St. Ignace. A shipping channel through the winter ice is maintained by the Coast Guard's Great Lakes icebreaker, USCGC Mackinaw, based in Cheboygan near the eastern edge of the Straits. This vessel went into service during the 2005/06 ice season.

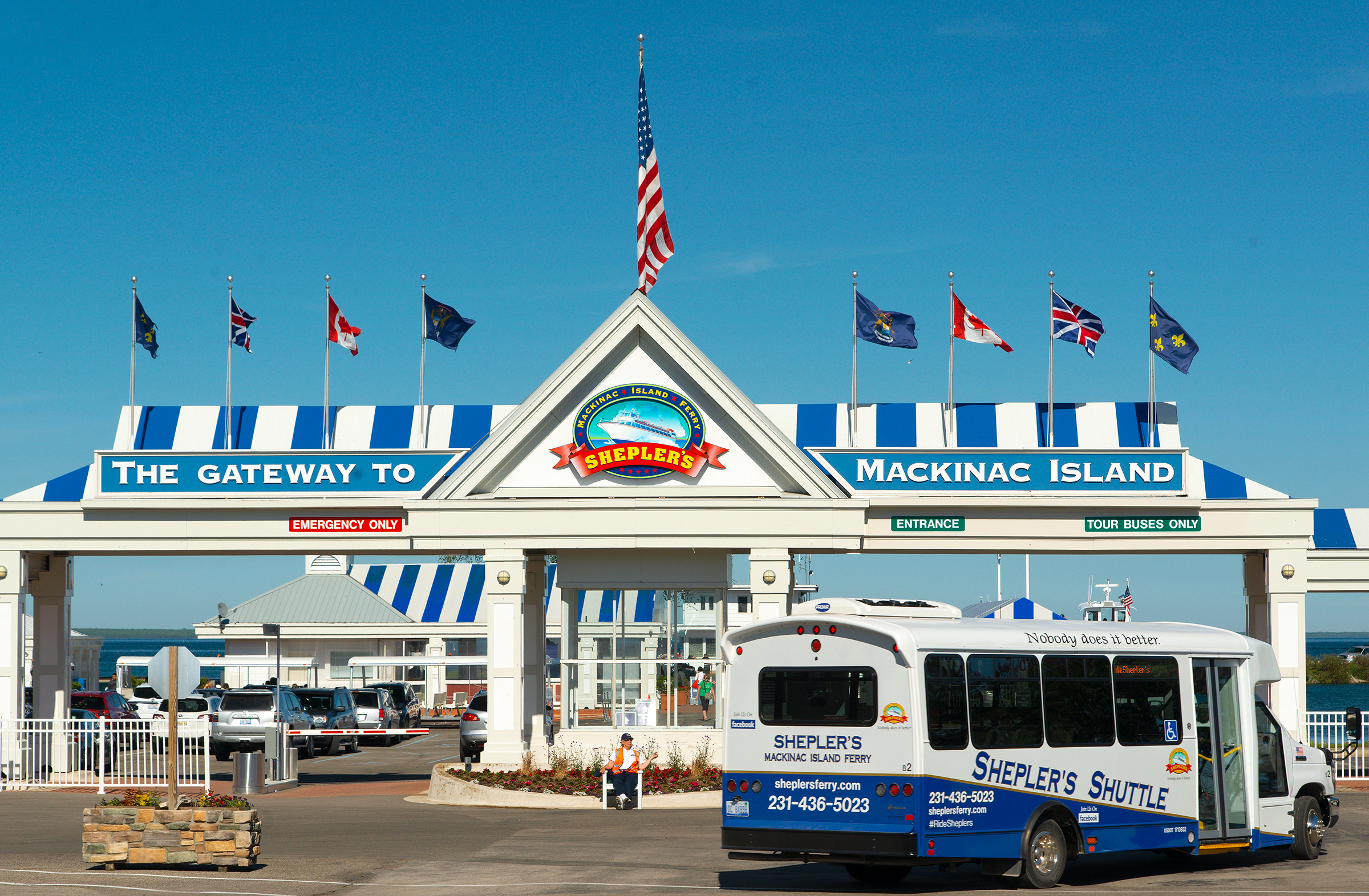
The Shepler's ferry dock in Mackinaw City

Two ferry companies operate out of Mackinaw City and St. Ignace, connecting tourists and commuters to Mackinac Island: Shepler's Ferry and the Arnold Transit Company.

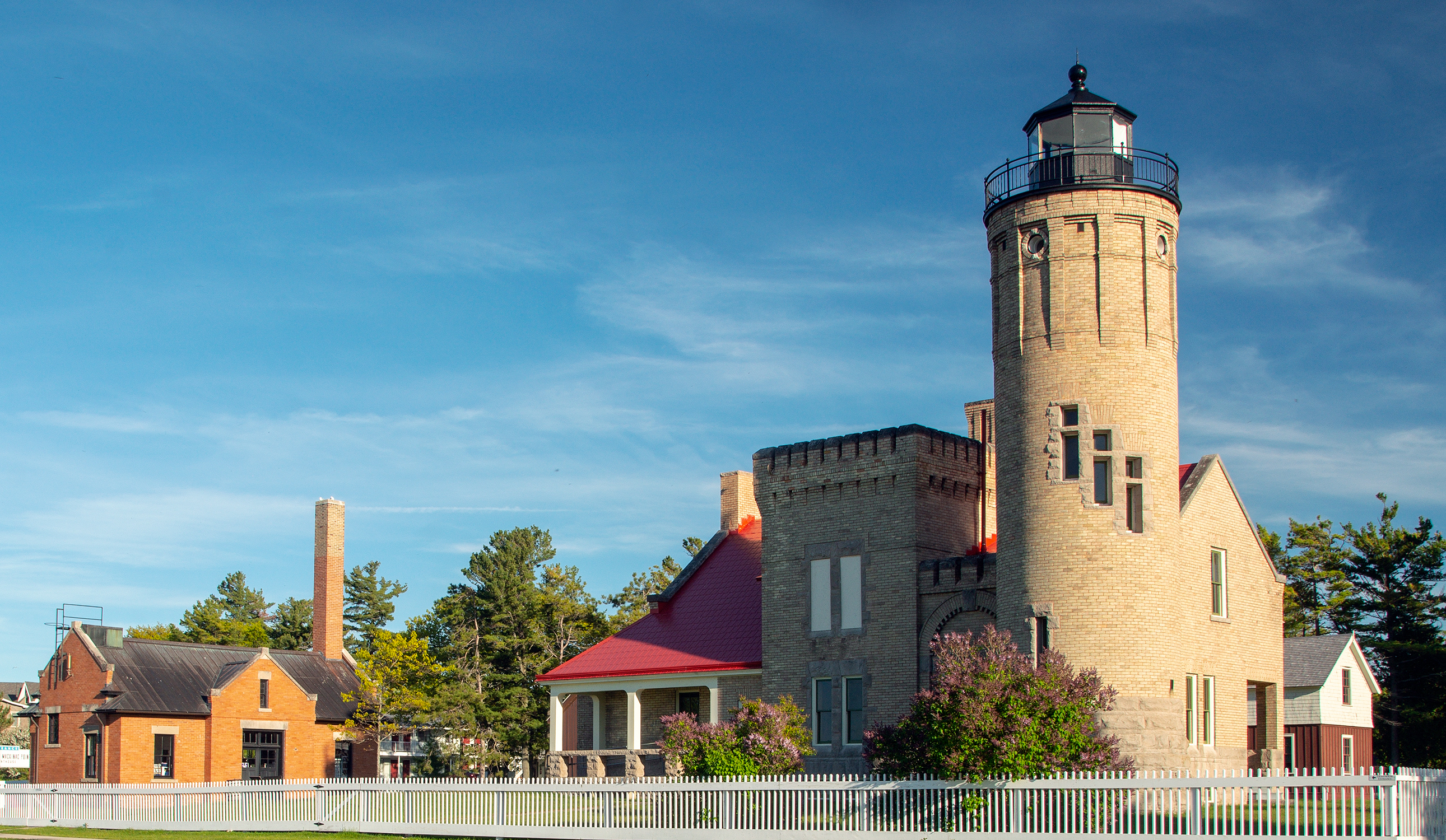
Old Mackinac Point Lighthouse

Most of the Straits have been set aside by the state of Michigan as the Straits of Mackinac Shipwreck Preserve, a riparian public space dedicated to those personnel who were lost aboard the boats and ships that sank in these dangerous shipping lanes.

Lighthouses in the Straits of Mackinac include:

- The McGulpin Point Light, on McGulpin Point, three miles (5 km) west of Fort Michilimackinac.
- The Old Mackinac Point Light, in Mackinaw City, which is open to the public.
- The Round Island Light on Round Island, which is not open to the public but which can be viewed from the Mackinac Island ferry channel.
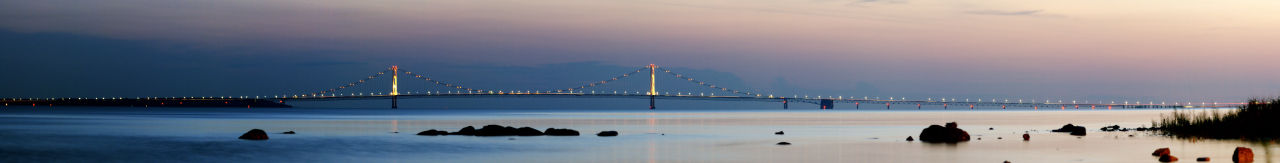
2008 panorama of the Straits from Mackinac Island

== Enbridge pipeline ==
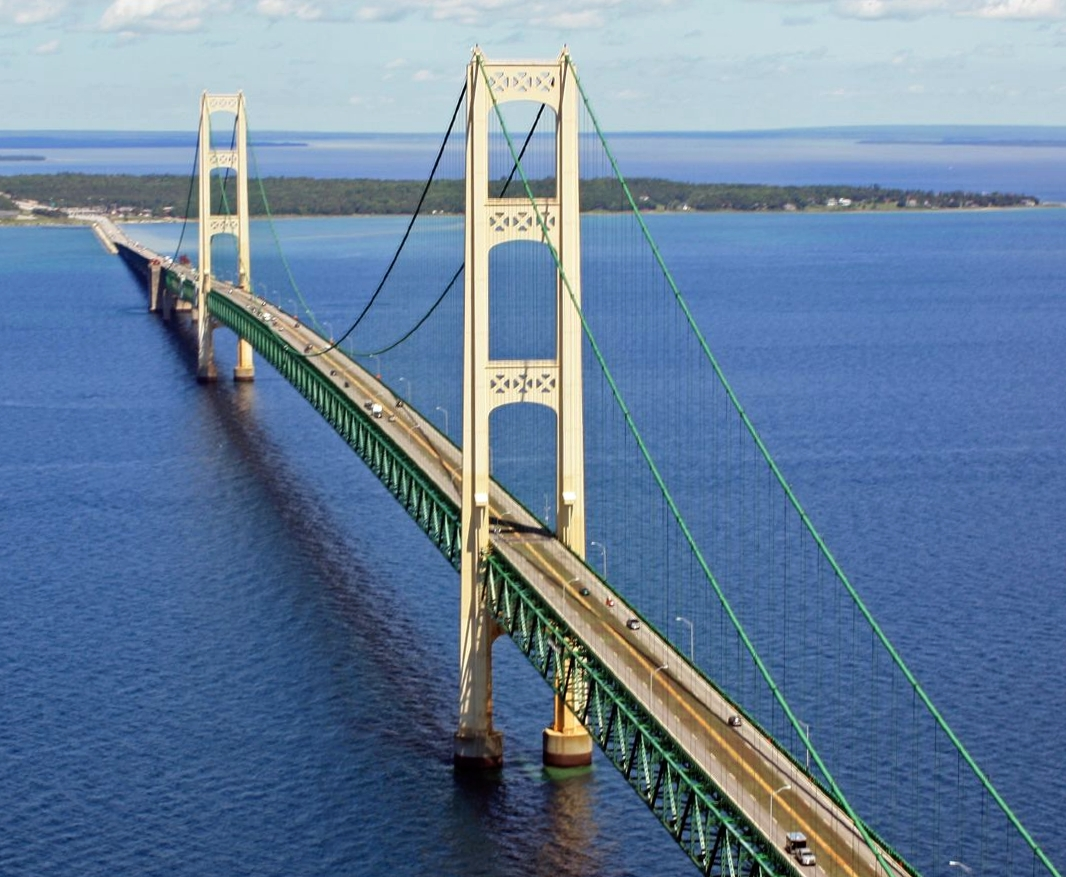
Mackinac Bridge

West of the iconic Mackinac Bridge is Enbridge's pipeline, called Enbridge Line 5, which was built in 1953 as an extension of the 1,150-mile (1,850 km) Interprovincial Pipe Line Company line bringing oil from Alberta to Lake Superior. The 1953 pipeline enters the Straits of Mackinac water on the north shore at St. Ignace, Michigan, and lies along the bottom of the Straits which is nearly 250 feet (76 m) in places. By 2013 Enbridge had increased the "maximum capacity on the lines to 540,000 bbl (86,000 m^{3}) per day". In selling the idea of the pipeline to residents living near the Straits, the pipeline developers claimed, it was "essential to the defense of the United States and the whole North American continent". A University of Michigan study studied the risks of a leak, leading to experts and local governments calling for the shutdown of the pipeline.

In late June 2019, the state of Michigan filed a lawsuit asking the Ingham County Court to compel the decommissioning of the segment of Line 5 that runs under the Straits of Mackinac. A Reuters news report defined Line 5 as "a critical part of Enbridge’s Mainline network, which delivers the bulk of Canadian crude exports to the United States". The basis of the suit is the claim that the pipeline is a public nuisance and violates the Michigan Environmental Protection Act since it may become the source of pollution. The news report adds that "it is unclear if Line 5 could operate without the Straits segment".

== Mackinac Straits Corridor Authority ==
On December 12, 2018, Michigan Governor Rick Snyder signed a bill establishing the Mackinac Straits Corridor Authority, which is charged with overseeing the construction and operation of a tunnel to hold a new Enbridge Line 5 under the lake bed in the straits. Snyder also appointed its first members: Geno Alessandrini of Iron Mountain, Anthony England of Ypsilanti, and Michael Zimmer of Dimondale, who serve six-year terms.

== See also ==
- Huron Lightship
- Straits of Mackinac Shipwreck Preserve
