= William L. Haskin =

U.S. Army brigadier general

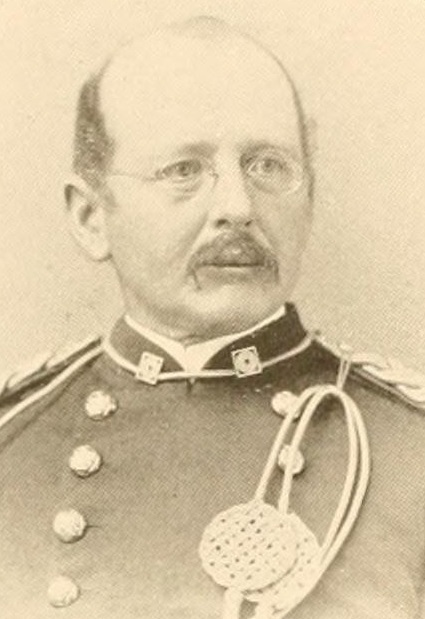
- From 1892's Officers of the Army and Navy Who Served in the Civil War
- Born: May 31, 1841; Hancock Barracks, Maine
- Died: September 24, 1931 (aged 90); New London, Connecticut
- Burial place: Arlington National Cemetery
- Alma mater: Rensselaer Polytechnic Institute
- Spouse: Annie Lydia Davis (m. 1865-1931, his death)
- Children: 4
- Relatives: Joseph A. Haskin (father); Joseph Alfred Gaston (son in law); Marcus P. Miller (brother in law)
- Military career
- Allegiance: Union (American Civil War); United States
- Branch: U.S. Army Field Artillery Branch
- Service years: 1861-1865 (Union Army); 1865-1903 (U.S. Army)
- Rank: Brigadier General
- Units: Union Army; United States Army
- Commands: Battery F, 1st Field Artillery Regiment; Battery H, 1st Field Artillery Regiment; Battery K, 1st Field Artillery Regiment; Fort Columbus, New York; 2nd Battalion, 1st Field Artillery Regiment; Jackson Barracks, Louisiana; Fort Schuyler, New York; Willets Point, New York; 2nd Field Artillery Regiment; Artillery District of New London; Artillery Defenses of Havana; U.S. Forces in Cuba
- Conflicts: American Civil War; Spanish–American War
- Other work: Author

William L. Haskin (May 31, 1841 – September 24, 1931) was a career officer in the United States Army. A Union Army veteran of the American Civil War, Haskin took part in the quashing of the 1866 and 1870 Fenian raids, when Irish nationalists attempted to organize in the United States, then invade the British dominion of Canada. In addition, he took part in the federal government's response to the Great Railroad Strike of 1877.

During the Spanish–American War, Haskin commanded the coastal defenses at Willets Point and Fort Schuyler, New York. After the war, he commanded the Artillery Defenses of Havana, Cuba during the post-war occupation. When the United States Military Government in Cuba ended in 1902, Haskin was appointed to command all U.S. forces remaining on the island. In 1903, the U.S. Congress passed legislation permitting Union Army veterans still on active duty at ranks below brigadier general to be advanced one grade. Haskin was then serving as a colonel, and was promoted to brigadier general. He retired later that year. Haskin died in New London, Connecticut on September 24, 1932. He was buried at Arlington National Cemetery.

== Early life ==
William Lawrence Haskin was born at Hancock Barracks near Houlton, Maine on May 31, 1841, the son of Brigadier General Joseph A. Haskin and Rebecca (Sprague) Haskin. Haskin was raised and educated at Army posts as his family traveled throughout the United States. Haskin's father was originally from Troy, New York and in 1857 Haskin began attendance at Troy's Rensselaer Polytechnic Institute. He graduated in 1861 with a degree in civil engineering.

== Start of career ==
After completing his education, Haskin applied for a commission in the Union Army. He was appointed a second lieutenant of Field Artillery on August 5, 1861, and he was promoted to first lieutenant on the same day. Haskin's initial assignment was with the 1st Field Artillery Regiment.

=== American Civil War ===
Haskin was initially posted to Fort Washington, where he took part in the American Civil War's defense of Washington, D.C. In November 1861 he was assigned to duty at Fort Pickens, Florida, then took part in the occupation of Pensacola, Florida. In July 1862, he was assigned to the Department of the Gulf in Louisiana. He remained in Louisiana until 1864, and took part in the Battle of Fort Bisland (April 1863), a skirmish in Jeanerette, Louisiana (April 1863), and the Siege of Port Hudson (May to July, 1863).

In 1864, Haskin commanded Battery F, 1st Field Artillery during the Siege of Port Hudson. He took part in a skirmish at Marksville, Louisiana on May 15, 1864, and one near Mansura, Louisiana on May 16, 1864. In September 1864, Haskin was assigned to recruiting duty. From February to September 1865, he served as aide-de-camp to his father, who was serving as chief of artillery for the XII Corps during the Campaign of the Carolinas. After the war, Haskin received brevet promotions to captain, effective July 8, 1863 to recognize his valor at Port Hudson and major, effective March 13, 1865 to recognize meritorious service throughout the war.

== Continued career ==
From September 1865 to June 1866, Haskin was assigned to Fort Trumbull, Connecticut, where he served as assistant commissary of subsistence and acting assistant quartermaster. In June 1866, Haskin was part of the Army contingent sent to Malone, New York in response to a planned Fenian raid. The Fenians were Irish nationalists who attempted to further the cause of Irish independence from Great Britain by attacking the British dominion of Canada. In 1866, Fenians attempted to organize and equip themselves at sites along the Canada–United States border prior to crossing into Canada. The U.S. military response prevented the attack by dispersing the Fenians. Haskin was promoted to permanent captain in July 1866.

After the first Fenian raid, Haskin was assigned to Fort Schuyler, New York. In 1870, he returned to Malone to take part in the suppression of the second Fenian raid. In the years that followed, he performed duty at several posts along the Atlantic coast. During the controversy and unrest in several southern states that followed the 1876 United States presidential election, Haskin was assigned to the Army contingents that prevented violence in South Carolina and Florida, two of the states in which the outcome was contested. In 1877, Haskin performed duty in Pittsburgh and Reading, Pennsylvania during the government's response to labor unrest that occurred as part of the Great Railroad Strike of 1877.

In 1879, Haskin authored a book, History of the First United States Artillery. In 1881, Haskin was assigned to the Pacific coast, and he performed artillery duty at several posts in California, and commanded the 1st Artillery's Battery H and Battery K. He was promoted to major on August 11, 1887. In 1888, he was assigned as inspector general and inspector of rifle practice for the Department of California. In 1889, he served on an Army board that conducted reconnaissance of several California ports in order to make recommendations for defending them with coast artillery. From July to September 1889, Haskin commanded a light artillery battalion during a summer training encampment in northern California. He was then posted to Fort Alcatraz, where he remained until returning to duty in the eastern United States.

== Later career ==
In 1890, Haskin was assigned to command the post at Fort Columbus, New York, which was garrisoned by three batteries of the 1st Field Artillery. He was active in the creation of the Military Service Institution of the United States, and was one of the editors of its bimonthly magazine. In the mid-1890s, Haskin commanded 2nd Battalion, 1st Field Artillery Regiment, which included batteries at Fort Wadsworth and Fort Slocum, New York.

In October 1896, Haskin was posted to Jackson Barracks, Louisiana with two batteries of the 1st Field Artillery, and was assigned as commander of the post. In December 1896, a volume Haskin co-authored was published, The Army of the United States, 1789-1896, which he wrote in partnership with Theophilus Francis Rodenbough. He was promoted to lieutenant colonel in June 1897 and assigned to the 2nd Field Artillery Regiment.

=== Spanish–American War ===
After becoming a lieutenant colonel, Haskin was assigned to command Fort Schuyler. During the Spanish–American War, Haskin was assigned to command the coast artillery positions at Fort Schuyler and Willets Point. In October 1899, he was promoted to colonel and assigned to command the 2nd Field Artillery Regiment.

=== United States Military Government in Cuba ===
After assuming command of the 2nd Field Artillery, Haskin was posted to Havana as part of the United States Military Government in Cuba. In late 1900 he was diagnosed with yellow fever, and in early 1901 he was granted a leave of absence. In October 1901, Haskin was assigned to command the Artillery District of New London, with headquarters at Fort Trumbull.

In March 1902, Haskin returned to Cuba as commander of the Artillery Defenses of Havana. When the United States Military Government in Cuba ended in May 1902, Haskin assumed command of all U.S. forces remaining in Cuba. In July 1903, the U.S. Congress passed a law permitting Union Army veterans still on active duty at the rank of colonel or lower to be advanced one grade. Haskin was eligible for promotion under these criteria, and was promoted to brigadier general. He retired on July 31 and returned to the United States.

== Retirement and death ==
In retirement, Haskin resided in New London, Connecticut. He died in New London on September 24, 1931. He was buried at Arlington National Cemetery.

== Family ==
In April 1865, Haskin married Annie Lydia Davis. They were the parents of one daughter and three sons—Lavinia, Joseph, William, and Lawrence. Lavinia Haskin was the wife of Brigadier General Joseph Alfred Gaston. Haskin's sister Katherine was the wife of Brigadier General Marcus P. Miller. His sister Frances was the daughter of Brigadier General Crosby P. Miller.
