= Piscataway Creek =

Piscataway Creek Pascattawaye Creek
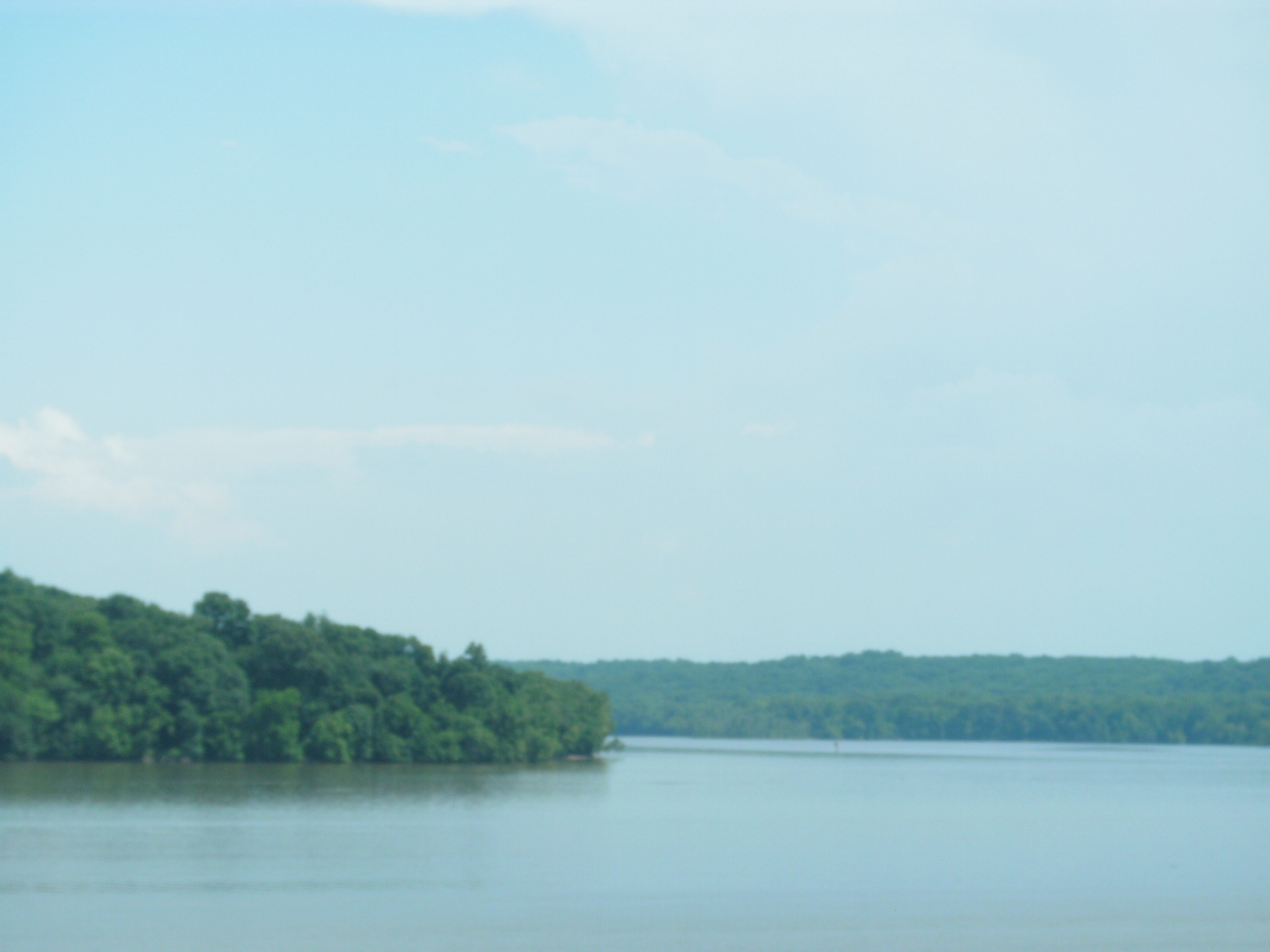
- Mouth of Piscataway Creek, as seen from across the Potomac River

Location
- Country: United States
- State: Maryland
- District: Prince George's County

Physical characteristics
- Source
  - location: Joint Base Andrews Naval Air Facility
  - coordinates: 38°47′37″N 76°52′7″W
  - elevation: 226 ft (69 m)
- Mouth: Potomac River
  - location: Fort Washington Park
  - coordinates: 38°42′37″N 77°2′24″W
  - elevation: 0 ft (0 m)

Basin features
- Tributaries
  - right: Tinkers Creek (Maryland)|Tinkers Creek

Piscataway Creek is an 18.6-mile-long (29.9 km) tributary of the Potomac River in Prince George's County, Maryland. The creek is a tidal arm of the Potomac for its final 2.5 miles (4.0 km), entering the Potomac at Fort Washington Park. Tinkers Creek is a tributary to Piscataway Creek, converging from the north 4.5 miles (7.2 km) upstream of the mouth of the Piscataway. The United States Geological Survey records two variant names for Piscataway Creek: Pascattawaye Creek and Puscattuway Creeke.

The Fort Washington Light was built to provide guidance for mariners entering Piscataway Creek from the Potomac River.

== See also ==
- List of Maryland rivers
