= Military Service Institution of the United States =

The Military Service Institution of the United States was a voluntary professional organization for officers of the United States Army and the National Guard. Established to promote the "Science and Art of War," the institution provided a forum for professional development through correspondence, discussion, and the publication of military studies. In his 1892 annual report, Major-General John Schofield, then Commanding General of the United States Army, praised the organization as a vital means of advancing military education.

== The Institution ==
It was organized on September 28, 1878, in New York City, with the first annual meeting taking place in January 1879. The Act of Incorporation was on June 17, 1884. U.S. Army officers who created the organization believed there was a need for an organization dedicated to their professional development, similar to the Royal United Services Institute of Great Britain.

The design of the Military Service Institution contemplated professional unity and improvement by correspondence, discussion and the reading and publication of essays, the establishment of a military library and museum, and the promotion of the military interests of the United States. The organization's headquarters were located at Fort Columbus (later called Fort Jay) on Governors Island, New York.

The institution did not long survive its founders, becoming defunct by the end of World War I.

== Membership ==
Membership Bowknot Ribbon Badge of the Institution (Colors red, blue, and yellow.)

The following named persons are eligible for full membership upon written application to the Secretary: Ex-officers of the Regular army of good standing and honorable record are eligible to membership by ballot; all officers of the Army and Professors and Cadets of the U. S. M. A. without ballot; officers of the Navy and Marine Corps are also entitled to full membership without ballot, but shall not be entitled to vote nor be eligible to office; all other persons of honorable record and good standing are eligible to Associate Membership upon written application, endorsed (except in case of the officers of the National Guard) by a member or associate member, by ballot of the Executive Council. Officers of the Organized Militia are eligible for Associate Membership upon written application, giving organization, rank and date of appointment.

== The Journal ==
The Journal of the Military Service Institution of the United States, edited by Artillery officers William L. Haskin and James Clark Bush, was a bimonthly magazine devoted to the professional development of all branches of the service. It contained original papers on subjects relating to the conduct of military operations, reprints and translations from the journals of other militaries, commentary on current events and topics of interest, and reviews of books relevant to the study of warfare.

== Library and Museum ==
The Military Service Institution of the United States museum was opened on Governor's Island in New York Harbor in 1884. It contained a collection of 10,000 books and manuscripts of interest; many volumes were from the private libraries of deceased officers and some are exceedingly rare publications.

The Museum contained relics and trophies of all wars and campaigns in which the United States has been engaged, as well as models and specimens of the latest improvements in war material, loaned by and renewed from time to time by the bureaus of the War Department. The Museum was shut down in 1924 due to declining attendance.

== Annual Prizes ==
=== Gold And Silver Medals ===
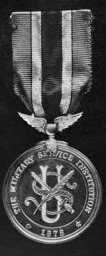
Military Service Institution of the United States Gold Medal.

The institution awarded two primary annual prizes for essays on military topics. The first prize consisted of a gold medal, $100, and life membership in the institution. The second prize included a silver medal, $50, and honorable mention.

For best two essays on topics of current military interest selected by the council: competition open to all eligible to membership; award on recommendation of Board chosen by Council: essays not less than 5,000 nor more than 10,000 words.

A Gold Medal prize was won by John Gibbon in 1881 for his essay on "The Indian question".

=== The Seaman Prize ===
(Founded by Major L. L. Seaman, M.D., LL.B., late Surgeon, U. S. V.)

First Prize. One Hundred Dollars.

Second Prize. Fifty Dollars.

For best two essays on a subject selected by Major Seaman and approved by Council: competition open to all officers and ex-officers of Army, Navy, Marine Corps, Marine Hospital Service, Volunteers or National Guard: in other respects same as Gold Medal prize except that essays are limited to 15,000 words.

=== The Santiago Prize ===
(Founded by the Society of the Army of Santiago de Cuba.)

Prize. Fifty Dollars.

For "best article upon matters tending to increase the efficiency of the individual soldier, squad, company, troop or battery," published in the Journal M. S. I. during a twelvemonth; awarded upon recommendation of Board selected by President N. S. A. S. C.: competition limited to officers of the Army and National Guard below grade of Lieut.-Colonel: essays not less than 1,000 nor more than 5,000 words.

== Short Paper Prizes ==
Essays to be not less than 1,500 nor more than 3,500 words published in the Journal during twelve months.

=== Hancock Prize ===
Fifty Dollars and Certificate of Award.

For best short paper on matters affecting the Line of the Army. To be given for the best original essay or, paper, critical, descriptive, or suggestive on a subject directly affecting the Line, published in the Journal Op The Institution during the twelve months ending May 1 of each year and which has not been contributed in whole or in part to any other association, nor has appeared in print prior to its publication by the Institution, nor has been published in the Journal in any previous year, and excluding essays for which another prize has been awarded.

=== Fry Prize ===
Fifty Dollars.

For best short paper on matters affecting the General Service not covered by Hancock Prize. To be the same as the Hancock Prize and awarded upon the recommendation of a board of three members of the Institution, not line officers or members of the Executive Council, under the same regulations for papers or essays appearing in the Journal during the twelve months ending September 1 of each year on subjects directly affecting the military service and not otherwise provided for

== Charter directors ==
- Winfield Scott Hancock, President
- George W. Getty, Vice-president
- James Barnet Fry, Vice-president
- Stephen W. Benét, Vice-president
- Thomas Leonidas Crittenden, Vice-president
- Wesley Merritt, Vice-president
- Theophilus Francis Rodenbough, Secretary
- Robert Catlin, Assistant Secretary
- George F. Price, Treasurer
- J. Estcourt Sawyer, Vice-Treasurer

== Past Officers ==
=== Presidents ===
- Winfield Scott Hancock (1878–1886)
- John M. Schofield (1887–1897)
- Nelson A. Miles (1898–1900)
- Thomas H. Ruger (1901–)

== Sources ==
- Constitution, by-laws and register: together with memoranda relating to the history and work of the institution, Military Service Institution of the United States, Governor's Island, N.Y.H., Wynkoop Hallenbeck Crawford co., 1906.
- "ARMY OFFICERS UNITING. A MILITARY SERVICE INSTITUTION. FORMATION OF A NEW NATIONAL BODY FOR THE ADVANCEMENT OF MILITARY SCIENCE—WHAT THE ORGANIZATION HOPES TO ACCOMPLISH—ITS OFFICERS AND ITS PLANS—A SIMILAR ENGLISH INSTITUTION". The New York Times. September 29, 1878.
- "Relics of Many Battles; Shown by the Military Service Institution". The New York Times. September 9, 1889.
