= Marcus P. Miller =

U.S. Army general (1835–1906)

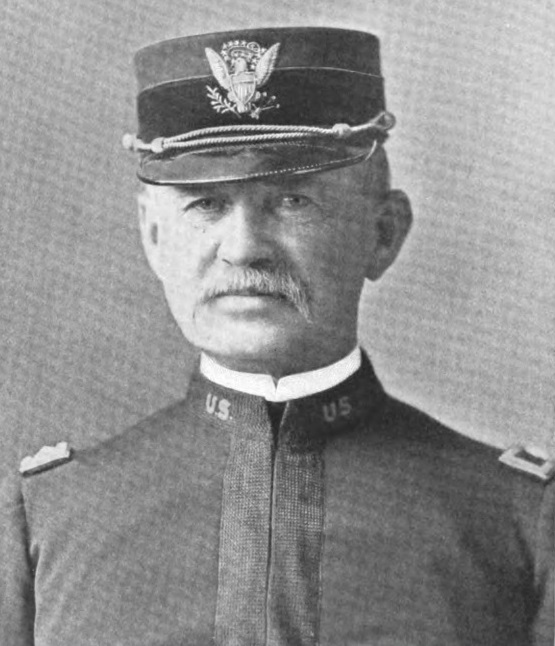
- Munsey's Magazine, April 1899
- Born: March 27, 1835; Stockbridge, Massachusetts, US
- Died: December 11, 1906 (aged 71); Fort Barrancas, Florida, US
- Burial place: Arlington National Cemetery
- Spouse: Katherine Sprague Haskin (m. 1863–1906)
- Children: 5
- Relatives: Joseph A. Haskin (father in law); Colden Ruggles (son in law)
- Military career
- Allegiance: United States
- Branch: United States Army
- Service years: 1858–1899
- Rank: Brigadier General
- Unit: U.S. Army Field Artillery Branch
- Commands: Battery G, 4th Artillery; Fort Columbus; 1st Artillery Regiment; Fort Hamilton; St. Francis Barracks; 3rd Field Artillery Regiment; Fort McDowell; Coast Artillery Defenses of San Francisco Bay; 1st Brigade, Eighth Army Corps; Independent Division, Eighth Army Corps; Military District of Panay, Negros, Cebu, and Leyte
- Conflicts: American Civil War; American Indian Wars; Spanish–American War; Philippine–American War

Marcus Peter Miller (March 27, 1835 – December 11, 1906) was a career officer in the United States Army. A Union Army veteran of the American Civil War and a U.S. Army veteran of the American Indian Wars, Spanish–American War, and Philippine–American War, he served from 1858 to 1899, attained the rank of brigadier general, and was commended for gallantry during several Civil War battles, the Modoc War, Nez Perce War, and the Iloilo campaign of the Philippine–American War.

== Early life ==
Marcus P. Miller was born in Stockbridge, Massachusetts, on March 27, 1835, a son of Marcus L. Miller and Eliza Caroline (Van Bramer) Miller. He was educated in Stockbridge, and graduated from Stockbridge's Williams Academy. He began attendance at the United States Military Academy in 1854. He graduated in 1858, ranked eighth in his class of 28. Miller was appointed a second lieutenant by brevet in the Artillery branch.

== Start of career ==
Miller was assigned to the Artillery School at Fort Monroe, Virginia, from 1858 to 1860. He received his commission as a second lieutenant in September 1859 and was assigned to the 4th Artillery Regiment. In 1860, Miller was in charge of recruits he escorted to their duty stations in Utah Territory. He then served at Fort Crittenden, Utah Territory from 1860 to 1861.

== Civil War ==
In May 1861, Miller was promoted to first lieutenant. From October 1861 to March 1862, he took part in the Defenses of Washington, D.C., as a member of the 4th Artillery. He was the regiment's quartermaster from February to April 1862 and regimental adjutant from April 1862 to March 1864. Miller served in the Peninsula campaign as Ordnance officer of the Army of the Potomac's reserve artillery from March to August 1862. On July 1, 1862, he took part in the Battle of Malvern Hill, for which he received a promotion to brevet captain.

Miller commanded Battery G, 4th Artillery from September to November, 1862 and took part in the Army of the Potomac's Maryland campaign. He was in charge of his battery during the September 17, 1862 Battle of Antietam. Miller continued in command during the Rappahannock campaign of October to November 1862. He was still in command in late 1862 and early 1863, including the Battle of Fredericksburg on December 13, 1862, and Second Battle of Fredericksburg on May 3, 1863.

From May to June, 1863, Miller was assigned to the garrison at Fort Washington, Maryland. He served as mustering officer for recruits in Baltimore, Maryland from June to August 1863, after which he returned to the garrison at Fort Washington, where he remained until March 1864. From March to November 1864, Miller served on an examining board for new officers at the War Department headquarters in Washington, D.C., and Annapolis, Maryland. He was promoted to captain on March 11, 1864.

Miller commanded a battery in Kernstown, Virginia, from November 1864 to February 1865. He took part in General Philip Sheridan's Shenandoah Valley movements from February to April 1865. He then took part in the Appomattox campaign, including the Battle of Dinwiddie Court House on March 31, 1865, and an engagement at Scotts Corner on April 2, 1865. He took part in the April 6, 1865, Battle of Sailor's Creek and the Battle of Appomattox Court House on April 9, 1865. Miller was present at Confederate General Robert E. Lee's surrender.

Miller returned to Washington, D.C., with his regiment at the end of the war. He was promoted to brevet major on March 13, 1865, in recognition of his meritorious service during the campaign from Winchester to Richmond, Virginia. He was promoted to brevet lieutenant colonel on March 31, 1865, in recognition of his gallant conduct at Dinwiddie Court House.

== Post-war ==
After the Civil War, Miller served with his regiment in Washington, D.C., from June 1865 to November 1867. He was on duty at Fort McHenry, Maryland, from November 1867 to March 1870. He was on duty in Charleston, West Virginia, from March to November 1870. From November 1870 to November 1872 Miller was again on duty at Fort McHenry.

== American Indian Wars ==
Miller was on frontier duty at Fort Stevens, Oregon, from November 1872 to June 1877 and took part in the Modoc War of 1872–1873. He was in command of an Artillery battalion during the Nez Perce War from June to October 1877. He served at the Presidio of San Francisco from November 1877 to June 1878. From June to September 1878 he took part in the Bannock War.

Miller was assigned to Fort McDowell, California, from October 1878 to October 1879. From October 1879 to August 1881, Miller was assigned to the Artillery School at Fort Monroe, Virginia. From August 1881 to August 1884, Miller served as an instructor of Artillery tactics at the United States Military Academy. He received promotion to Major in the 5th Artillery Regiment on September 14, 1883.

From September 1884 to November 1886, Miller was assigned to Fort Hamilton, New York, including a leave of absence for illness from June to October 1885. From November 1886 to June 1888, Miller was inspector of rifle practice and acting ordnance officer for the Military Division of the Atlantic. He was commander of the post at Fort Columbus, New York from July to December 1888. From January 1889 to October 1894, Miller was again assigned to the staff of the Artillery School, this time as superintendent of instruction for Field Engineering, Electricity, Mechanical Engineering, and the Art of War.

On February 27, 1890, Miller was promoted to brevet colonel for gallant and meritorious service on April 17, 1873, at Lava Beds, California, during the Modoc War and Clearwater, Idaho, on July 11 and 12, 1877 during the Nez Perce War. He was promoted to lieutenant colonel in the 1st Artillery Regiment on October 10, 1894.

== Spanish–American War ==
Miller commanded the 1st Artillery Regiment and Fort Hamilton, New York from October 1894 to October 1896. He remained in command when the regiment moved to St. Francis Barracks in Saint Augustine, Florida, and also commanded the post. Miller was promoted to colonel on April 30, 1897, and took command of the 3rd Field Artillery Regiment and the post at Fort McDowell, California.

At the start of the Spanish–American War in April 1898, Miller assumed command of all the Coast Artillery forts protecting San Francisco Bay. In addition, he served on wartime boards that considered the retirement and promotion of officers. In May 1898, Miller was promoted to brigadier general of United States Volunteers. From May to July 1898, Miller commanded 1st Brigade, Eighth Army Corps. From July to November 1898, Miller commanded the Eighth Army Corps' Independent Division and the garrison troops at The Presidio of San Francisco.

== Philippine–American War ==
From November to December 1898, Miller commanded the Independent Division of the Eighth Army Corps while en route to the Philippines. Upon arrival, he took part in the Philippine–American War as commander of the 1st Separate Brigade of the Eighth Army Corps. The brigade was immediately ordered to take control of the city of Iloilo on the island of Panay from Spanish troops who were departing after the end of the Spanish–American War.

Filipino insurgents occupied Iloilo after the Spanish departed but before Miller's command arrived. the brigade took over most of the city in February 1899. During this command, Miller passed an information copy of the memo describing the U.S. benevolent assimilation policy for the Philippines to local officials styling themselves as the Federal Government of the Visayas. Miller was unaware that General Elwell Otis had supplied a bowlderized version of the memo to Filipino leader Emilio Aguinaldo in Manila. The unaltered version eventually made its way to Aguinaldo, who compared it to the altered one. The contrast between the two versions made Otis appear to be deceptive, which increased tension between the U.S. occupation government and the Filipinos.

On February 12, the 1st Separate Brigade captured the city's district of Jaro, then successfully defended against three insurgent counterattacks. In February 1899, Miller was promoted to brigadier general in the regular army. In addition to commanding the 1st Separate Brigade, Miller commanded the Military District of Panay, Negros, Cebu, and Leyte. He remained in these posts until reaching the mandatory retirement age of 64 on March 27, 1899.

== Retirement and death ==
In retirement, Miller was a resident of Stockbridge, Massachusetts. He was staying with his son Lawrence at Fort Barrancas, Florida, during the winter of 1906–1907 when he died of heart disease on December 11, 1906. Miller was initially interred at Fort Barrancas, and later reburied at Arlington National Cemetery.

== Family ==
On November 5, 1863, Miller married Katherine Sprague Haskin (1843–1925), the daughter of General Joseph A. Haskin and sister of General William L. Haskin. They were the parents of five children – Rebecca, Marcus, Mary, Lawrence, and Anne. Rebecca Miller resided in Washington, D.C., and was active in civic and legacy organizations, including the National Society of the Colonial Dames of America, Daughters of the American Revolution, and Daughters of the United States Army. Marcus Lyon Miller was a career officer in the United States Navy and attained the rank of captain. Mary Appleton Miller was the wife of General Colden Ruggles. Lawrence was a career Army officer and retired as a colonel. Anne was the wife of Colonel Morris Keene Barroll.

== Legacy ==
Commemorative plaques marking unit locations during the Battle of Antietam include one for Miller and Battery G, 4th Artillery Regiment. The plaque is located on what is now the east side of Branch Avenue in Sharpsburg, Maryland.

Battery Marcus Miller was named for Miller in 1907. One of several Coast Artillery gun emplacements intended to protect San Francisco Bay, the battery was located near what is now the southwest end of the Golden Gate Bridge. Battery Marcus Miller remained in operation until it was dismantled in 1920.
