= Saskadena Six =

Ski area in Vermont, United States

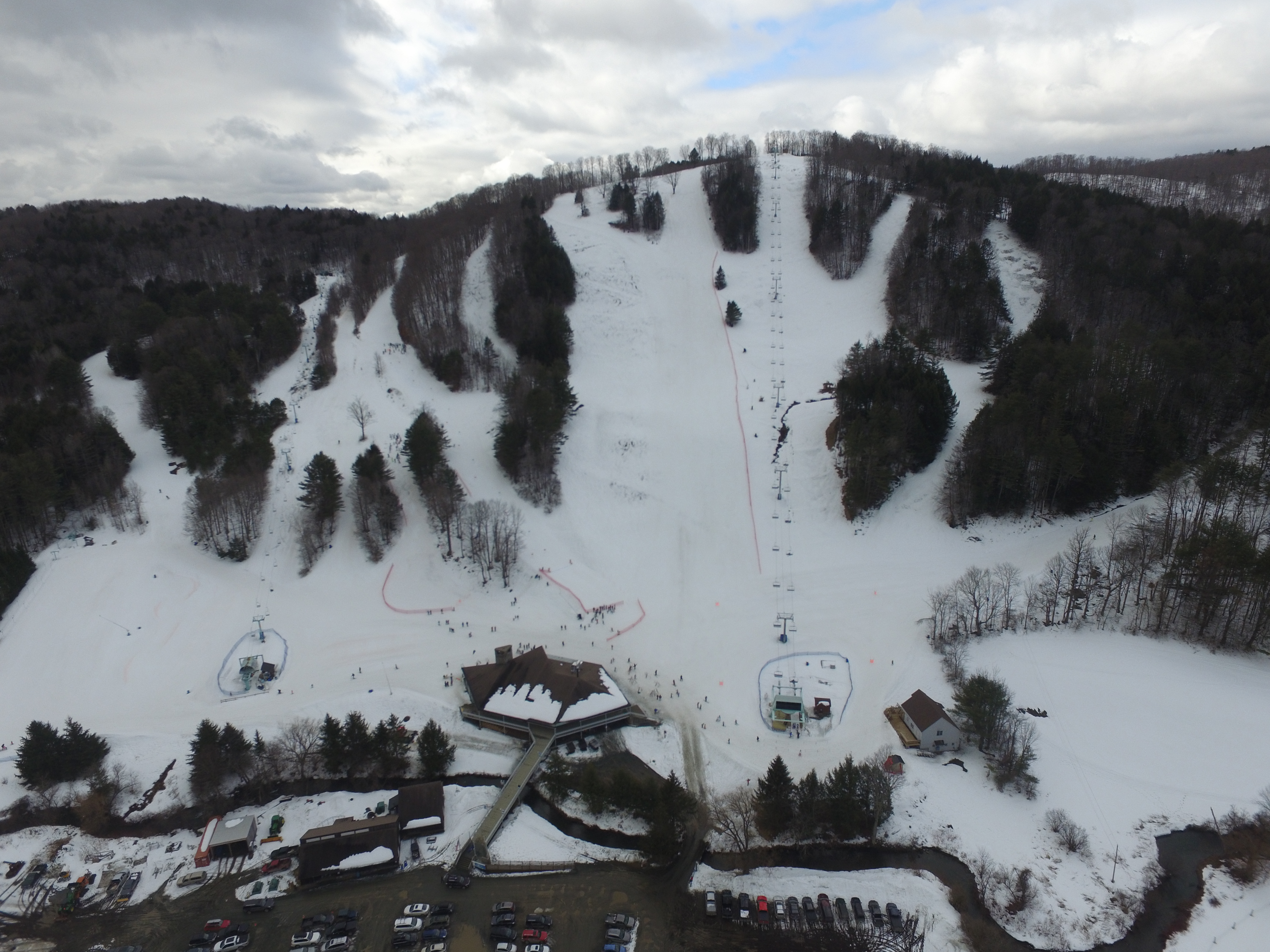
- Interactive map of Saskadena Six
- Location: South Pomfret, Vermont
- Coordinates: 43°39′50″N 72°32′40″W
- Vertical: 650 feet (200 m)
- Top elevation: 1,200 feet (370 m)
- Base elevation: 550 feet (170 m)
- Skiable area: 100 acres (40 ha)
- Trails: 28
- Longest run: 5,280 feet (1,600 m)
- Lift system: 1 quad, 1 double chair, 1 surface carpet
- Lift capacity: 3,000 passengers/hr
- Terrain parks: 1 (Milky Way)
- Snowfall: 110 inches (280 cm)
- Snowmaking: 100%
- Night skiing: No
- Website: saskadenasix.com

Saskadena Six (formerly Suicide Six) is a ski resort in South Pomfret, Vermont. Its claim to historical fame as the earliest ski resort derives from the installation, in January 1934, of an improvised rope tow, the first in the United States, on a hill located on Clinton Gilbert's farm. The rope tow was originally powered with a Ford Model T engine. By the following month, Wallace "Bunny" Bertram (a former ski coach at Dartmouth College who had helped build the original rope lift) took over the operation, and installed a more reliable electric motor. A few years later he moved his operation to a steeper hill nearby, shown on the map as "Hill 6". Bertram once joked that to ski down the nearby Hill No. 6 would be suicide. Two years later the resort was opened using this name and photos of Bertram can be seen in the resort museum in the base lodge. Devotees of ski mountaineering and backcountry skiing mark this as the beginning of the divergence of resort skiing and traditional backcountry skiing.

Suicide Six was the location of the first National Snow Surfing Championships in 1982, considered an important event in the development of snowboarding as a sport, which later would become the U.S. Open Snowboarding Championships.

Bunny Bertram sold the resort to Laurance Rockefeller in 1961 and development continued in conjunction with Rockefeller's nearby Woodstock Inn. In a 2004 article, the Boston Globe described Suicide Six as "steeped in history", and now a "low key" location for "a taste of rural skiing". As of late 2011, when Suicide Six marked its 75th anniversary, the facility included 23 runs and continued to operate as the ski area of the Woodstock Inn. In 2016, the resort celebrated its 81st anniversary, and installed a brand new Leitner-Poma Alpha quad chairlift, over 2,000 feet (600 m) in length to the summit. In 2018, the mountain had developed summer programs, and opened a lift-served mountain bike park, only the 6th such park in the state of Vermont. In 2020, the lift served mountain biking was ceased, but the area is open to the public to park and ride up/down as they please. Maintenance of the MTB trails has been assumed by the Woodstock Area Mountain Bike Association (WAMBA). The continued investment and development into the area as a year-round destination continues to add vibrance and activities to the region in the heart of the Green Mountains.

The resort is host to the longest running ski race in North America, The Fisk Trophy Race. It was first held in 1937 and is a rite of passage for serious eastern ski racers. Notable past winners include Bode Miller, Chip Knight, Jimmy Cochran, Shane McConkey, and many other Olympians, US Ski Team members, and NCAA Champions.

In 2022, the ski area announced that they would be retiring the Suicide Six name citing the "increasing awareness surrounding mental health" and "growing concerns about the insensitive nature of the historical name". The new name Saskadena (pronounced sahs-kah-deena) means 'standing mountain' in the Abenaki language and was selected in consultation with Don Stevens "to honor the original inhabitants of the land and the mountain’s multi-generational legacy and values of community, inclusion, adventure, discovery, and fun".
