= North Pomfret, Vermont =

- Unincorporated community
- Location within Vermont Location within the United States
- Coordinates: 43°43′22″N 72°28′47″W
- Country: United States
- State: Vermont
- County: Windsor
- Town: Pomfret
- Elevation: 883 ft (269 m)
- Time zone: UTC-5 (Eastern (EST))
  - Summer (DST): UTC-4 (EDT)
- ZIP code: 05053
- Area code: 802
- GNIS feature ID: 1458752

North Pomfret (also Snows Store) is an unincorporated community within the town of Pomfret in Windsor County, Vermont, United States. Its ZIP code is 05053.

== Notable people ==
- Scott Milne, politician
- Dana Stone, journalist
- Ron Galotti, media executive
