= Joseph Alfred Gaston =

United States Army brigadier general

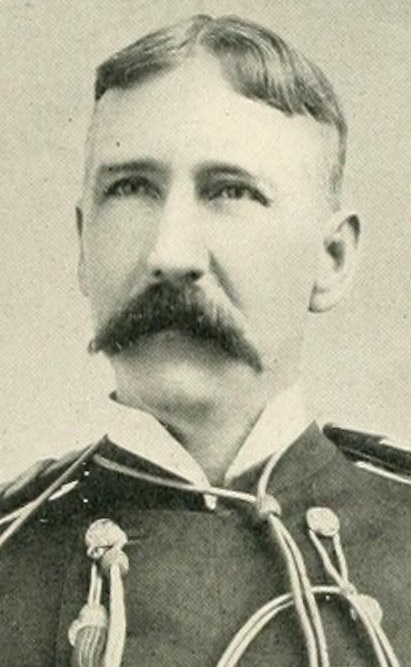
- From 1899's A Military Album, Containing Over One Thousand Portraits of Commissioned Officers Who Served In the Spanish-American War
- Born: September 2, 1856; Honey Brook, Pennsylvania, US
- Died: March 31, 1937 (aged 80); Washington, D.C., US
- Burial place: Arlington National Cemetery, Virginia, US
- Spouse: Lavinia Haskin (m. 1903-1937, his death)
- Military career
- Allegiance: United States
- Branch: United States Army
- Service years: 1881–1920
- Rank: Brigadier General
- Service number: 0-13494
- Unit: Cavalry Branch
- Commands: United States Army Cavalry School; 6th Cavalry Regiment; 165th Depot Brigade; 19th Division; 90th Division; 74th Infantry Brigade; 37th Division; 11th Infantry Brigade; 11th Division; Camp Meade, Maryland
- Conflicts: American Indian Wars; Spanish–American War; Pancho Villa Expedition; World War I

Brigadier General Joseph Alfred Gaston (September 2, 1856 – March 31, 1937) was a United States Army officer in the late 19th and early 20th centuries. He served in the Spanish–American War, among other incidents and conflicts.

== Early life ==
Gaston was born on September 2, 1856, in Honey Brook, Pennsylvania. He attended Wyoming Seminary and Pennsylvania's Commercial College. Afterward, he entered the United States Military Academy, graduating 16th of 53 in 1881 and being commissioned into the 8th Cavalry Regiment.

== Career ==
From 1881 to 1891, Gaston served on frontier duty, which mainly involved military actions against the Apache and Sioux. He participated in the Spanish–American War, serving in Cuba from 1899 to 1902, and he later went to the Philippines. Gaston commanded permanent relief camps after the 1906 San Francisco earthquake. He graduated from the United States Army War College in 1912, and between November 1913 and April 1914, after traveling again to the Philippines between 1908 and 1910, he commanded the Cavalry School at Fort Riley. Gaston later commanded the 6th Cavalry Regiment and served at the border with Mexico and on the Pancho Villa Expedition in that capacity.

Gaston was promoted to the rank of brigadier general on August 5, 1917, and assumed command over the 165th Depot Brigade at Fort Travis in Texas. He commanded the 19th Division, then the 90th Division from November 23 to December 27, 1917. He commanded the 74th Infantry Brigade, a unit of the 37th Division. From January to March 1918, he commanded the 11th Infantry Brigade, a unit of the 6th Division. He was commander of the 37th Division from April 25 to May 8, 1918. He commanded Camp Meade, Maryland, from June 1918 to February 5, 1919. In August 1918, he commanded the 11th Division.

After reverting to his permanent rank of colonel, Gaston did recruiting duty in Philadelphia. He retired from the Army on September 2, 1920, having reached the mandatory retirement age of 64. Congress restored Gaston's brigadier general rank in June 1930.

== Death and legacy ==
He died on March 31, 1937, at his residence in Washington, D.C. He is buried at Arlington National Cemetery.

== Personal life ==
Gaston married Lavinia Haskin (1866–1944), the daughter of Brigadier General William L. Haskin, on May 16, 1903.
