= John Throop =

American judge (1733–1802)

John Throop (September 11, 1733 – January 25, 1802) was a political and military leader of the Vermont Republic and the state of Vermont. Among the offices he held, Throop served as a justice of the Vermont Supreme Court from 1778 to 1780.

== Early life ==
John Throop was born in North Woodstock, Colony of Connecticut, on September 11, 1733, the son of Rev. Amos Throop and Frances (Davis) Throop. He was educated in Woodstock and in the early 1770s Throop relocated to Pomfret, Vermont.

== Military service ==
Throop commanded a company of militia with the rank of captain, and took part in the American Revolution, including several scouting parties and patrols dispatched to provide early warning if British Army soldiers attacked Vermont from Canada.

== Political career ==
After becoming a resident of Pomfret, Throop held several offices, to include: justice of the peace (beginning in 1773); town clerk (1778-1789); delegate to the 1777 constitutional convention; member of the Vermont House of Representatives (1778, 1787-1788); member of the Governor's Council (1779-1786); justice of the Vermont Supreme Court (1778-1780); judge of the Vermont Court of Confiscation which seized and resold the property of Tories (1779); and probate judge for Windsor County (1783-1792).

== Death ==
Throop died in Pomfret on January 25, 1802.

== Family ==
On December 17, 1755 he married Frances Dana (1735-1813), known as Fanny. They were the parents of four sons: Nathaniel, Benjamin, Samuel, and John Winchester.

== Sources ==
=== Books ===
- Child, Hamilton (1881). Gazetteer and Business Directory of Windsor County, Vt., for 1883-84. Vol. 1. Syracuse, NY: Syracuse Journal.
- Dana, Elizabeth Ellery; Dana, Henry Wadsworth Longfellow (1956). The Dana Family in America. Boston, MA: Wright & Potter Printing Company.
- Goodrich, John E. (1904). The State of Vermont: Rolls of the Soldiers in the Revolutionary War, 1775 to 1783. Rutland, VT: The Tuttle Company. p. 704.
- Walton, Eliakim Persons (1874). Records of the Governor and Council of the State of Vermont. Vol. II. Montpelier, VT: J & J. M. Poland.

=== Magazines ===
- Dwight, Meletiah Everett (January 1, 1905). "The Throope Family and the Scrope Tradition". The New York Genealogical and Biographical Record. New York, NY: New York Genealogical and Biographical Society.
