= Pomfret, Vermont =

- Town
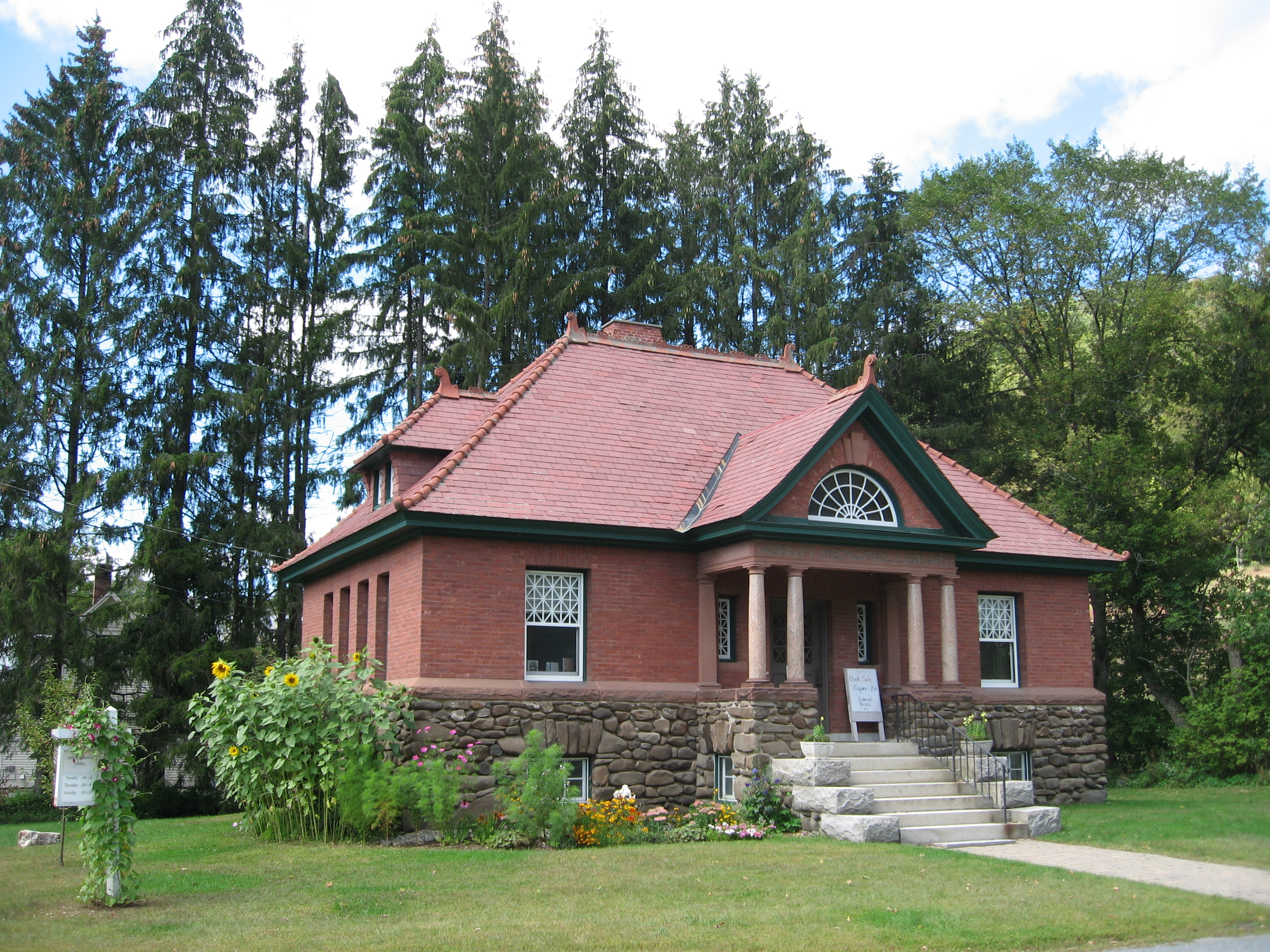
- Abbott Memorial Library in South Pomfret

- Location in Windsor County and the state of Vermont.
- Coordinates: 43°43′10″N 72°30′13″W
- Country: United States
- State: Vermont
- County: Windsor
- Communities: Pomfret; North Pomfret; South Pomfret; Hewitts Corners; Millbrook

Area
  - Total: 39.5 sq mi (102.2 km^{2})
  - Land: 39.4 sq mi (102.0 km^{2})
  - Water: 0.077 sq mi (0.2 km^{2})
- Elevation: 1,453 ft (443 m)

Population (2020)
  - Total: 916
  - Density: 23.3/sq mi (8.98/km^{2})
- Time zone: UTC-5 (Eastern (EST))
  - Summer (DST): UTC-4 (EDT)
- ZIP Codes: 05053 (North Pomfret); 05067 (South Pomfret); 05068 (South Royalton); 05084 (West Hartford); 05091 (Woodstock)
- Area code: 802
- FIPS code: 50-56350
- GNIS feature ID: 1462177
- Website: pomfretvt.us

Pomfret is a town in Windsor County, Vermont, United States. The population was 916 at the 2020 census.

== History ==
The town was named after the Earl of Pomfret. Pomfret was chartered in 1761 by Benning Wentworth, who was the governor of New Hampshire. The first settler (1770) was Bartholomew Durkee, who came from Pomfret, Connecticut. Pomfret was called "New Pomfret" at first because most of the people who settled there came from the town in Connecticut.

One of the earliest ski tows in the United States was established at South Pomfret in 1934, and became known as Suicide Six. Now called Saskadena Six, it has developed into a small ski resort with a moderate-size lodge, a quad chairlift installed in 2017, and large snowmaking capabilities.

In 1976, then-cardinal Karol Wojtyla visited North Pomfret during the summer for a vacation. He later became Pope John Paul II and was canonized a saint.

== Geography ==
According to the United States Census Bureau, the town has a total area of 39.5 square miles (102.2 km^{2}), of which 39.4 square miles (102.0 km^{2}) is land and 0.1 square mile (0.2 km^{2}) (0.15%) is water. The Ottauquechee River flows along a portion of the southern boundary of the town. The Pomfret town hall is located in the center of town, on the watershed divide between the White River (North Pomfret) and the Ottauquechee River (South Pomfret). The Appalachian Trail crosses the town from southwest to northeast.

== Demographics ==
Historical population
Census	Pop.	Note	%±
1790	710		—
1800	1,106		55.8%
1810	1,433		29.6%
1820	1,635		14.1%
1830	1,867		14.2%
1840	1,774		−5.0%
1850	1,546		−12.9%
1860	1,376		−11.0%
1870	1,251		−9.1%
1880	1,139		−9.0%
1890	865		−24.1%
1900	777		−10.2%
1910	703		−9.5%
1920	732		4.1%
1930	728		−0.5%
1940	686		−5.8%
1950	586		−14.6%
1960	600		2.4%
1970	620		3.3%
1980	856		38.1%
1990	874		2.1%
2000	997		14.1%
2010	904		−9.3%
2020	916		1.3%
U.S. Decennial Census

As of the census of 2000, there were 997 people, 404 households, and 288 families residing in the town. The population density was 25.3 people per square mile (9.8/km^{2}). There were 544 housing units at an average density of 13.8 per square mile (5.3/km^{2}). The racial makeup of the town was 98.09% White, 0.10% African American, 0.50% Asian, 0.40% Pacific Islander, and 0.90% from two or more races. Hispanic or Latino of any race were 1.40% of the population.

There were 404 households, out of which 33.2% had children under the age of 18 living with them, 60.9% were married couples living together, 6.9% had a female householder with no husband present, and 28.7% were non-families. 22.0% of all households were made up of individuals, and 7.4% had someone living alone who was 65 years of age or older. The average household size was 2.47 and the average family size was 2.89.

In the town, the population was spread out, with 26.3% under the age of 18, 3.9% from 18 to 24, 24.5% from 25 to 44, 31.3% from 45 to 64, and 14.0% who were 65 years of age or older. The median age was 42 years. For every 100 females, there were 95.9 males. For every 100 females age 18 and over, there were 95.0 males.

The median income for a household in the town was $51,800, and the median income for a family was $56,250. Males had a median income of $31,063 versus $26,354 for females. The per capita income for the town was $27,922. About 3.4% of families and 4.8% of the population were below the poverty line, including 5.3% of those under age 18 and 5.9% of those age 65 or over.

== Notable people ==
- Elmer B. Adams, United States federal judge
- William Arkin, political commentator, activist and journalist
- Judah Dana, U.S. senator from Maine
- Rush Hawkins, Union general in the American Civil War
- Luke S. Johnson, leader in the Latter Day Saint movement
- Lyman E. Johnson, leader in the Latter Day Saint movement
- Crosby P. Miller, US Army brigadier general
- Scott Milne, businessman and 2014 Republican gubernatorial candidate
- Joe Perry, guitarist for Aerosmith
- John C. Sherburne, Chief Justice of the Vermont Supreme Court
- Dana Stone, Vietnam War journalist and photographer
- John Throop, early resident of Pomfret, militia officer, and judge
- Phineas White, United States Representative
