= Crosby P. Miller =

US Army brigadier general (1843–1927)

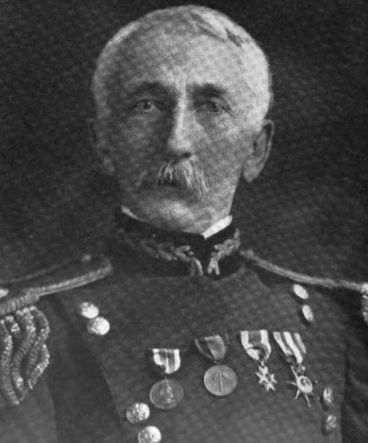
- From 1929's Annual Report of the United States Military Academy Association of Graduates
- Born: October 20, 1843; Pomfret, Vermont, US
- Died: March 30, 1927 (aged 83); Richmond, Virginia, US
- Burial place: West Point Cemetery
- Education: United States Military Academy
- Spouse: Frances Laura Haskin (m. 1874–1927)
- Children: 1
- Relatives: Joseph Abel Haskin (father-in-law); William L. Haskin (brother-in-law)
- Military career
- Allegiance: Union (American Civil War); United States
- Service: Union Army (Civil War); United States Army (United States)
- Service years: 1862‒1863 (Union); 1867‒1906 (Army)
- Rank: Brigadier General
- Units: U.S. Army Field Artillery Branch; United States Army Quartermaster Corps
- Commands: Chief of Construction, Fort Sheridan; Constructing Bureau, Office of the Quartermaster General of the U.S. Army; Chief Quartermaster of United States Volunteers; Bureau of Regular Supplies and Wagon Transportation, Office of the Quartermaster General of the U.S. Army; Chief Quartermaster, Eighth Army Corps and the Division of the Philippines; Chief Quartermaster, San Francisco Quartermaster Depot; Chief Quartermaster, Department of California
- Wars: American Civil War; American Indian Wars; Spanish–American War; Philippine–American War
- Other work: Constructing Officer, U.S. Soldiers' Home

Crosby P. Miller (20 October 1843 ‒ 30 March 1927) was a career officer in the United States Army. A veteran of the American Civil War, American Indian Wars, Spanish–American War, and Philippine–American War, he served from 1862 to 1863 and 1867 to 1906, and attained the rank of brigadier general. Assigned primarily to the Quartermaster Corps, Miller specialized in construction and transportation, including development of the cantonment at Fort Sheridan, Illinois.

== Early life ==
Crosby Parke Miller (Note: Miller's middle name is spelled in various records as "Parke", "Park", and "Parker".) was born in Pomfret, Vermont on 20 October 1843, a son of Crosby Miller and Orpha (Hewitt) Miller. He was raised and educated in Pomfret, then attended the private school run by Hosea Doten. In September 1862, he enlisted in the Union Army for the American Civil War and joined the 16th Vermont Infantry Regiment. He served until March 1863, and attained the rank of corporal.

Miller was discharged from the 16th Vermont Infantry so he could accept appointment to the United States Military Academy at West Point. He attended from July 1863 to June 1867, and graduated ranked 18th of 63. He received his commission as a second lieutenant of Field Artillery.

== Start of career ==
Miller was initially assigned to the 4th Artillery Regiment, with which he served at Fort Whipple, Virginia until October 1867. He was then assigned to coast artillery duty at Fort McHenry, Maryland, where he remained until March 1870. Miller was promoted to first lieutenant in December 1869. He was assigned to American Indian Wars duty at Fort Riley, Kansas from March 1870 to April 1871, including extended field duty for scouting missions from June to September 1870.

Miller served again at Fort McHenry from May 1871 to November 1872. He was then posted to coast artillery at the Presidio of San Francisco, California from November 1872 to April 1873. From May 1873 to May 1874, Miller was a student at Fort Monroe, Virginia's Artillery School for Practice, after which he returned to duty at the Presidio of San Francisco. In January 1875, his battery was moved to Fort Alcatraz in San Francisco Bay. In July 1875, Miller was assigned as quartermaster officer of the United States Military Academy, where he served until July 1880. He was on extended leave from July to November 1880, after which he resumed his quartermaster duties at West Point.

== Continued career ==
In November 1881, Miller returned to coast artillery defense of San Francisco Bay, this time at Point San Jose. From November 1881 to June 1885, Miller was assigned to coast artillery duty at Fort Preble, Maine. From July to December 1885, he was assigned as professor of military science at the University of Vermont. He was then assigned as adjutant of the Artillery School, where he remained until March 1887. Miller was next assigned as quartermaster of the 4th Artillery Regiment at Fort Adams, Rhode Island. In November 1887, Miller was promoted to captain.

Miller was assigned to duty at Fort Totten, New York from December 1887 to July 1888. In August 1888, Miller was assigned to oversee construction of the buildings at Fort Sheridan, Illinois, where he served until January 1890. He was then appointed to head the Constructing Bureau in the office of the Quartermaster General of the United States Army, where he served until January 1898. Miller was assigned as Fort Monroe's quartermaster in January 1898, and in February he received promotion to major.

With the outbreak of the Spanish–American War in April 1898, the army rapidly expanded, and Miller was assigned to the staff of the army's quartermaster general. In May, Miller was promoted to lieutenant colonel of United States Volunteers and assigned as chief quartermaster of volunteers. In July 1898, Miller resigned his commission in the volunteers and was appointed to command the quartermaster general's Bureau of Regular Supplies and Wagon Transportation with the temporary rank of colonel. In March 1899, Miller resigned from the United States Volunteers and returned to his permanent rank of major.

== Later career ==
From July 1899 to July 1901, Miller served during the Philippine–American War as chief quartermaster of the Eighth Army Corps and the Division of the Philippines. He was then assigned as chief quartermaster of the San Francisco Quartermaster Depot where he served until May 19, 1903. While at the depot, he also served as chief quartermaster of the Department California from December 1902 to May 1903. In October 1902, Miller was promoted to permanent lieutenant colonel. From May 1903 to March 1906, Miller was assigned to quartermaster duty on the general staff of the United States Department of War.

Miller was scheduled to leave the army upon reaching the mandatory retirement age of 64 in March 1907, which meant that if promoted to colonel in 1906, he would not meet the minimum requirement for time in grade to retire at that rank. Three other Civil War veterans still on active duty faced the same circumstance. The U.S. Congress had recently passed legislation permitting Civil War veterans on active duty as colonels to retire as brigadier generals. To ensure that Miller and the other three lieutenant colonels received they same consideration, they were promoted to brigadier general, after which they immediately retired. Under these provisions, Miller was promoted on 30 March and retired on 31 March, about a year before he would have reached the mandatory retirement age.

== Retirement and death ==
From June 1907 to April 1912, Miller served as constructing officer of the U.S. Soldiers' Home in Washington, D.C. In retirement, Miller was a resident of Burlington, Vermont and spent winters with his son in Richmond, Virginia. He frequently golfed in Burlington with Stephen Perry Jocelyn, also a Civil War veteran and retired brigadier general.

Miller died in Richmond on 30 March 1927. He was buried at West Point Cemetery.

=== Family ===
In April 1874, Miller married Frances Laura Haskin, the daughter of Joseph Abel Haskin and sister of William L. Haskin. They were the parents of a son, Crosby Miller, a bridge engineer for the Chesapeake and Ohio Railway.

== Dates of promotion ==
The effective dates of Miller's promotions were:

=== Union Army ===
- Private to Corporal, 4 September 1862 to 12 March 1863

=== Army ===
- Second Lieutenant, 17 June 1867
- First Lieutenant, 1 December 1869
- Captain, 21 November 1887
- Major, 4 February 1898
- Lieutenant Colonel (United States Volunteers), 9 May 1898
- Colonel (United States Volunteers), 12 July 1898
- Major, 3 March 1899
- Lieutenant Colonel, 2 October 1902
- Brigadier General, 30 March 1906
- Brigadier General (Retired), 31 March 1906
