= Fort Washington Light =

Lighthouse in Maryland, United States

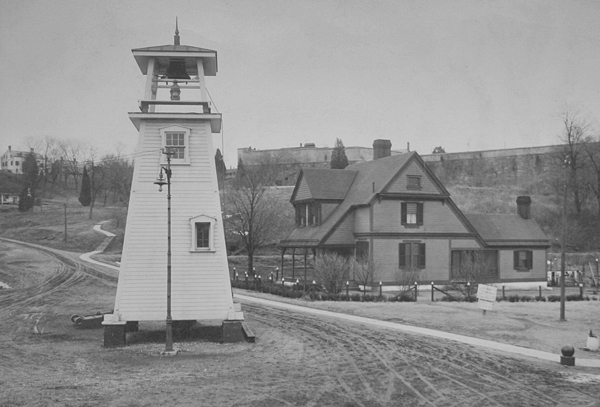
- Circa 1913 Wooden Fort Washington Light (USCG photo) with 1857 Cast Iron Light Pole in front
- Location: Fort Washington Park, Prince George's County, United States
- Coordinates: 38°42′43″N 77°02′13″W

Tower
- Constructed: 1882
- Construction: wood (housing)
- Automated: 1954
- Height: 8.5 m (28 ft)
- Shape: pyramid

Light
- First lit: 1901
- Focal height: 28 ft (8.5 m)
- Lens: sixth order Fresnel lens
- Range: 8 nmi (15 km; 9.2 mi)
- Characteristic: Fl R 6s

Fort Washington Light is a lighthouse located on the banks of the Potomac River on the grounds of its namesake fort. There has been a lighthouse on the location since 1857; the current light was converted from a fog bell tower in 1901.

== History ==
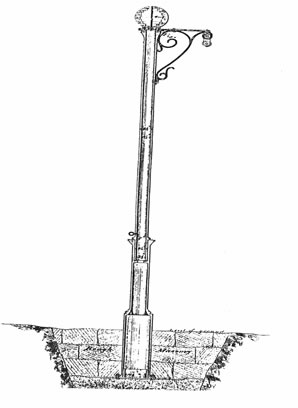
1857 Cast Iron Light Pole at Fort Washington - emplaced near the shore

Fort Washington projects into the Potomac River where the river turns north, and in 1856 Jefferson Davis, in his capacity of Secretary of War, authorized the construction of a lighthouse on the fort property, to be maintained by post personnel. Minimal funds were appropriated, and a temporary cast iron tower was constructed the following year. Almost immediately this light was found inadequate and in 1870 a 16-foot (4.9 m) replacement tower was constructed in Baltimore and erected on a site closer to the water. This tower had a sixth-order Fresnel lens.

In 1882 a wooden fog bell tower was erected, and in the following years a keeper's house and various other structures sprang up around the old tower, largely obscuring it. In 1900 a request was made to build a third, taller tower, and as a temporary expedient, a light was added to the fog bell tower, sitting on a platform attached near the top. The replacement light tower was never built, and the converted fog bell tower continues in service. Over the years the 1870 tower, the keeper's house, and the surrounding buildings were all demolished. The tower is readily visible to visitors to the park in which it stands, though it is closed to public access.

== Gallery ==
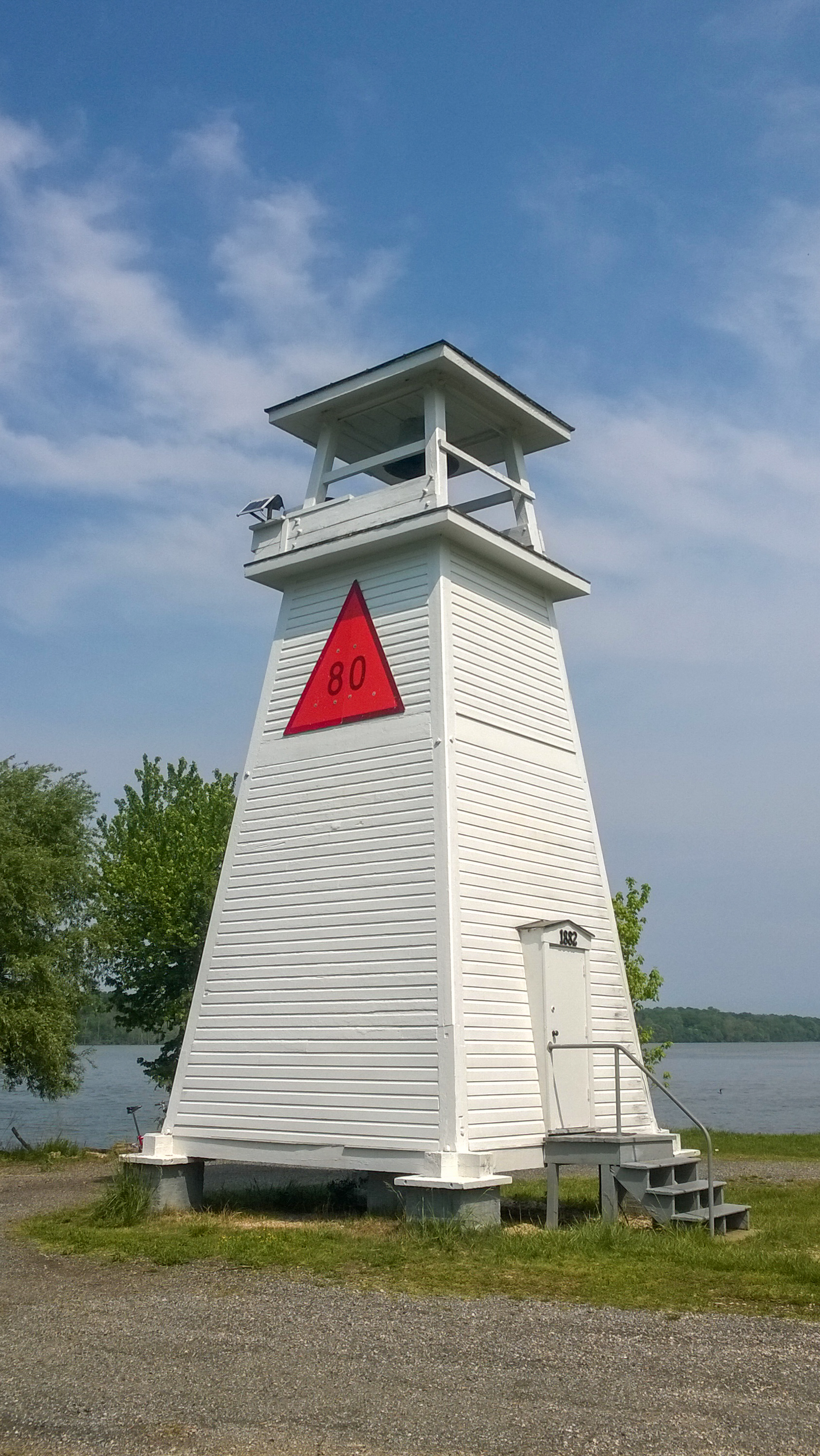
