= Theophilus Francis Rodenbough =

United States Army general

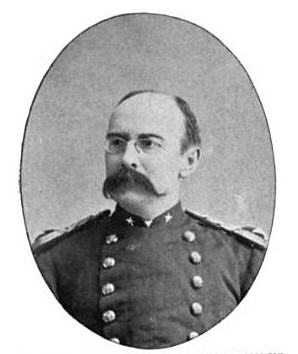
- Born: November 5, 1838; Easton, Pennsylvania, US
- Died: December 19, 1912 (aged 74); Easton, Pennsylvania, US
- Burial place: Easton Cemetery; Easton, Pennsylvania
- Military career
- Allegiance: United States of America; Union
- Branch: United States Army; Union Army
- Service years: 1861 - 1870
- Rank: Brigadier General
- Unit: (United States) 2nd U.S. Cavalry Regiment
- Commands: 19th Pennsylvania Cavalry Regiment; 42nd U.S. Infantry Regiment
- Conflicts: American Civil War: Battle of Trevilian Station; Gettysburg campaign; Battle of Opequon
- Awards: Medal of Honor
- Other work: author

Theophilus Francis Rodenbough (November 5, 1838 – December 19, 1912) was born in Easton, Pennsylvania and was a Union Army officer during the American Civil War. He received America's highest military decoration the Medal of Honor for his actions at the Battle of Trevilian Station. After his retirement from the U.S. Army in 1870, he wrote several books about military history.

== Biography ==
On March 27, 1861, shortly before the outbreak of the American Civil War, Rodenbough was appointed a second lieutenant in the 2nd U.S. Dragoons. He was promoted to 1st lieutenant on May 14, 1861. On August 3, 1861, Rodenbough was transferred to the 2d U.S. Cavalry Regiment as the 2nd US Dragoons were renamed the 2nd US Cavalry. He was promoted to captain, U.S. Army, July 17, 1862. Rodenbough was captured at the Battle of Second Bull Run on August 31, 1862, and exchanged on September 20, 1862. He served in the campaigns of the Army of the Potomac, and as a Regular Army captain commanded the 2nd U.S. Cavalry during the Gettysburg campaign.

=== Gettysburg Campaign ===
A monument dedicated to the regulars of the United States Army who fought at Gettysburg includes Rodenbough. The Gettysburg campaign was a series of engagements before and after the Battle of Gettysburg. To better understand Rodenbough's role within the military organization, the following brief is provided. For more details, see Gettysburg Union order of battle.

- The Army of the Potomac was initially under Major General Joseph Hooker then under Major General George G. Meade on June 28, 1863.
- The Cavalry Corps was commanded by Major General Alfred Pleasonton, with divisions commanded by Brigadier Generals John Buford, David McM. Gregg, and H. Judson Kilpatrick.

Division	Brigade	Regiments and Others
First Division: BG John Buford (2,748)
First Division: BG John Buford (2,748)	Reserve Brigade: BG Wesley Merritt	6th Pennsylvania Cavalry: Maj James H. Haseltine; 1st U.S. Cavalry: Capt Richard S. C. Lord; 2nd U.S. Cavalry: Capt Theophilus F. Rodenbough; 5th U.S. Cavalry: Capt Julius W. Mason; 6th U.S. Cavalry: Maj Samuel H. Starr, Lt Louis H. Carpenter, Lt Nicholas Nolan, Capt Ira W. Claflin

=== Medal of Honor ===
Rodenbough received the Medal of Honor for his efforts in the June 11, 1864 Battle of Trevilian Station, Virginia, where he was wounded. Rodebough lost his right arm in the Battle of Opequon, or Third Battle of Winchester, Virginia, on September 19, 1864. He briefly served as colonel of the 18th Pennsylvania Volunteer Cavalry Regiment between April 29, 1865, and October 31, 1865.

=== Post Civil War ===
Rodenbough was mustered out of the volunteer force on October 31, 1865. On January 13, 1866, President Andrew Johnson nominated Rodenbough for appointment to the brevet grade of brigadier general of volunteers, to rank from March 13, 1865, and the U.S. Senate confirmed the appointment on March 12, 1866. On July 28, 1866, Rodenbough was promoted to major, USA, and assigned to the 42nd U.S. Infantry Regiment. On July 18, 1868, President Johnson nominated Rodenbough for appointment to the brevet grade of brigadier general, U.S. Army (regular army), to rank from March 13, 1865, and the U.S. Senate confirmed the appointment on July 18, 1868. Rodenbough was unassigned after March 15, 1869.

== Retirement ==
Rodenbough retired in 1870 as a colonel. Afterwards, he was occupied as an author and as an employee of the Soldiers' Home in Washington, D.C., and in New York State. He was a companion of the New York Commandery of the Military Order of the Loyal Legion of the United States.

He was the author of:

- From Everglade to Cañon with the Second Dragoons (1875)
- Afghanistan and the Anglo-Russian Dispute (1885)
- Uncle Sam's Medal of Honor (1886)
- Sabre and Bayonet (1897)

Together with William L. Haskin he was the editor of The Army of the United States (1896)

On April 23, 1904, Rodenbough was appointed brigadier general, USA, on the retired list. Theophilus Francis Rodenbough is interred at Easton Cemetery in Easton, Pennsylvania. He died in December 1912 at age 74

== Medal of Honor citation ==

Rank and Organization:

Captain, 2d U.S. Cavalry. Place and date: At Trevlhan Station, Va., June 11, 1864. Entered service at: Pennsylvania. Born: November 5, 1838, Easton, Pa. Date of issue: September 21, 1893.

Citation:

Handled the regiment with great skill and valor, was severely wounded.

== See also ==
- List of Medal of Honor recipients
- List of American Civil War Medal of Honor recipients: Q–S
