= Fort Washington Park =

Historic fort and military reservation in Fort Washington, Maryland, US

- IUCN category III (natural monument or feature)
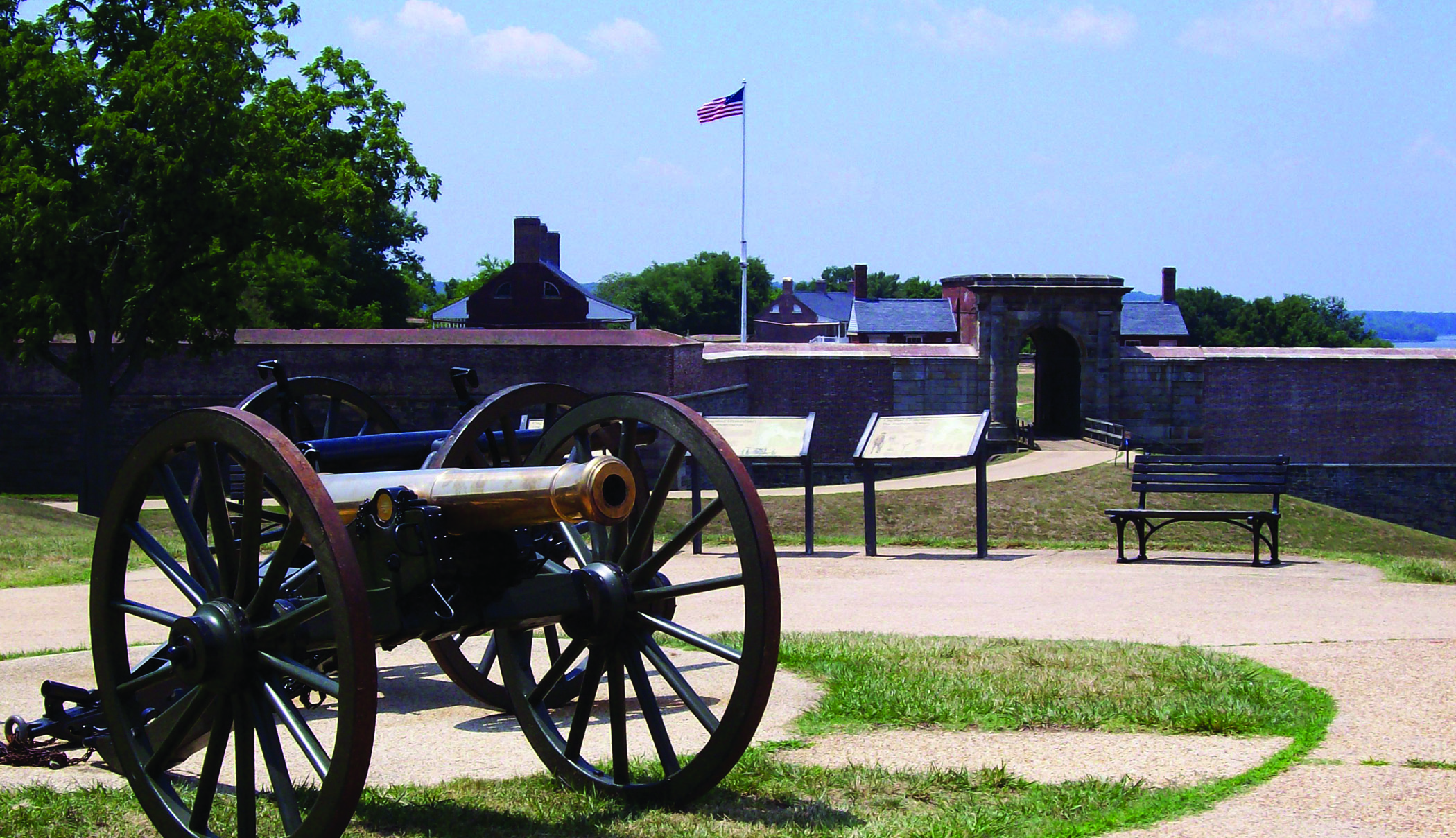
- Cannon outside Fort Washington, Maryland

- Location within Maryland Location within the United States
- Location: Prince George's County, Maryland, U.S.
- Nearest city: Fort Washington, Maryland, U.S.
- Coordinates: 38°42′39″N 77°01′59″W
- Area: 341 acres (138 ha)
- Visitors: 406,917 (in 2022)
- Governing body: National Park Service
- Website: Fort Washington Park
- Fort Washington
- U.S. National Register of Historic Places
- U.S. Historic district
- Nearest city: Fort Washington, Maryland
- Area: 341 acres (138 ha)
- Built: 1808
- Built by: T.W. Maurice under Walker Keith Armistead
- Architectural style: Second & Third Period
- NRHP reference No.: 66000965
- Added to NRHP: October 15, 1966

Fort Washington, located near the community of Fort Washington, Maryland, was for many decades the only defensive fort protecting Washington, D.C. The original fort, overlooking the Potomac River, was completed in 1809, and was begun as Fort Warburton, but renamed in 1808. During the War of 1812, the fort was destroyed by its own garrison during a British advance.

The current historic fort—maintained by the National Park Service—was initially constructed in 1824. It is a stone structure with a good cannon shot down the Potomac River. The fort was extensively remodeled in the 1840s and 1890s. The Fort was turned over to the U.S. Department of the Interior in 1946 after its last military personnel departed.

The expansive grounds of the present Fort Washington Park, with its extensive hiking/bicycle paths and river view, are a scenic venue for picnicking, fishing, and outdoor recreation. Historical re-enactments are held periodically at the Fort, and there is a small museum. In 2006, repairs were done to shore up the crumbling outer wall, in preparation for the 200th anniversary.

The Fort Washington Light, located below the fort, was established in 1857. The current tower, standing 28 feet tall, was constructed in 1882.

== History ==
=== Native American, colonial, and early independence eras ===
Native Americans of the Piscataway tribe had long lived in the area where Piscataway Creek meets the Potomac River in southern Maryland and understood the defensive value of the promontory above the river there.

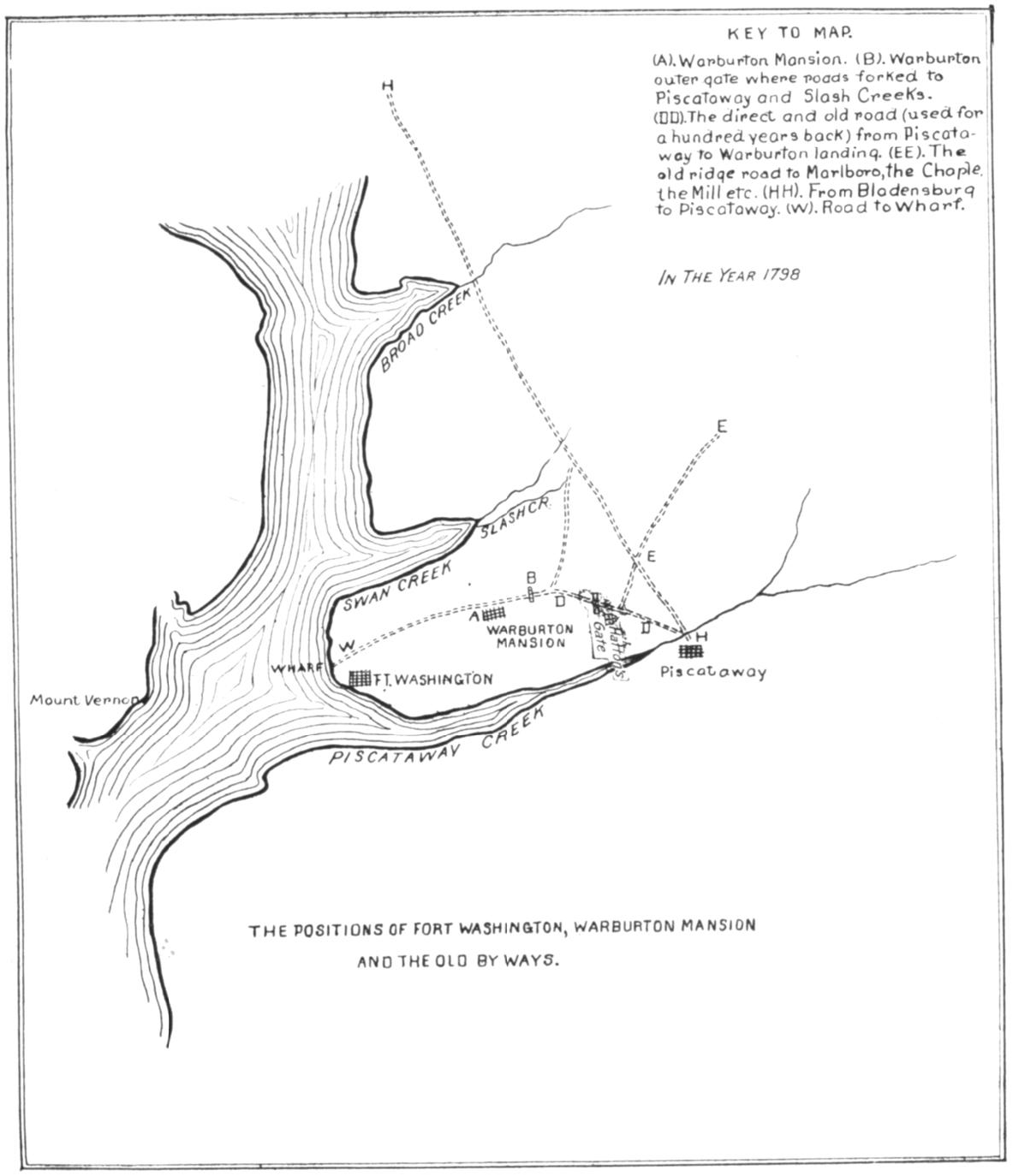
Fort Washington, Warburton Mansion and the Old By Ways in 1798

When Governor Leonard Calvert first explored the area in 1634, he "found the surrounding heights covered with Indians, to the number of about five hundred, in hostile array." After securing peace with the Piscataway, in 1645 an act for the defense of the province established a garrison of 100 men at the same site at the mouth of Piscataway creek.

In 1661, Edward Digges, former Colonial Governor of Virginia established The Manor of Warburton on 1200 acres bounded by Piscataway Creek, the Potomac River and Swan Creek. His heirs continued to live on the property throughout the Colonial period. When George Washington built Mount Vernon, it was almost directly across the river from Warburton Manor. Washington would often visit with the Digges family, or pass through Warburton after crossing the river on his way to Upper Marlboro or Annapolis, Maryland.

Through these visits, and from his vantage point at Mount Vernon, Washington became familiar with the Warburton location and came to understand its defensive advantages on the Potomac River. In 1794, as president, he directed Secretary of War Henry Knox to construct a fortification on the site, with a budget not to exceed $3,000. The money authorized was instead spent trying to construct a fort at Jones Point, on the Virginia side of the river. In 1798 Washington again urged that a fort be built at Digges Point, but no work was done. Finally, in 1805, when Congress was contemplating a second coastal fortification system, the Secretary of War directed Lieutenant Colonel Jonathan Williams to evaluate Digges Point for a "circular battery, say of twelve cannon."

=== 1804–1814 ===
Captain George Bomford was assigned to the work and the plans of Fort Madison at Annapolis were used for the Potomac fort. It was soon discovered that the four acres purchased from Thomas Digges was too small. Colonel Williams directed Captain Bomford to lay out the work again but on a reduced scale. The barracks was shifted to one side and one wing shortened to accommodate the new design. Work commenced on April 14, 1808, and was completed on December 1, 1809. It was anticipated that 120 artillerymen would be assigned to the post as a wartime garrison and gunboats from the Navy Yard would support the fort. Captain Bomford described the fort as "an enclosed work of masonry comprehending a semi elliptical face with a circular flank on the side next to the Potomac." There were also quarters for two companies and a total of 15 cannon. On the bluff above the fort, a masonry tower could house one company and six additional cannons. Later, Captain Bomford reported "Fort Washington was really an attempt to adopt a standardized plan to an unsuitable site. It violated a fundamental rule in the art of fortifications—the fort must suit its site."

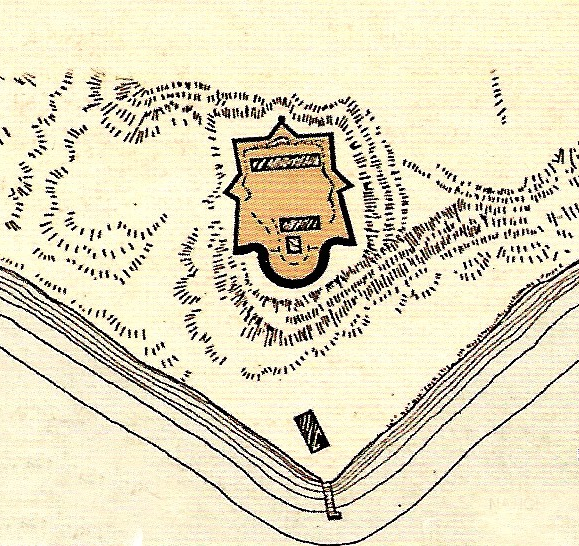
Drawing of Fort Warburton (later Washington) as constructed in 1809

When completed, it was the only fortification on the Potomac River. Perpendicular earthen walls stood 14 feet above the bottom of the ditch that surrounded the river side of the fort. A tower facing the river contained six cannon. Although it mounted twelve or fifteen guns (later increased) which commanded the river below its position, the American Brigadier General William H. Winder, commanding the military district around Washington, feared that a determined naval force could nevertheless blast its way past the fort. It would then have Washington at its mercy. A survey the previous year also noted that the fort blockhouse was only able to resist musket fire, and could be destroyed by a cannon as small as a twelve-pounder. Its garrison consisted of 49 men under Captain Samuel T. Dyson, of the United States Army's Corps of Artillery, and elements of the U.S. 9th and 12th Infantry Regiments.

On June 18, 1812, the United States declared war on the United Kingdom. At the time, Britain was also at war with France and, with their fleet thus engaged, there was very little British naval activity along or against the American coasts. A British squadron did make an attempt to ascend the Potomac in July 1813, but turned back after meeting some resistance from militia and encountering treacherous shoals. As concern for the security of Washington rose, Major Pierre L'Enfant was sent to evaluate the fort and reported "the whole original design was bad and it is impossible to make a perfect work of it by any alterations." The Secretary of the Navy ordered an additional water battery of 9 guns to be built and manned by seamen under Lieutenant Decius Wadsworth. At this time, the name "Fort Washington" was gaining popularity but official correspondence often indicated Warburton, Digges Point, the Fort at Warburton, Fort Warburton and Fort Washington above the date line.

=== Destruction ===
In April, 1814, Napoleon abdicated and was exiled. This freed the British army and navy to focus on the conflict with the United States. In early August, part of a naval squadron under Captain James A. Gordon began ascending the Potomac River from the Chesapeake Bay. The Secretary of War, General John Armstrong, Jr., did not see any military value to Washington. He believed that the British movement toward the Capital was a ruse and insisted that their destination was actually Baltimore, so no effort was made to strengthen the Washington defenses.

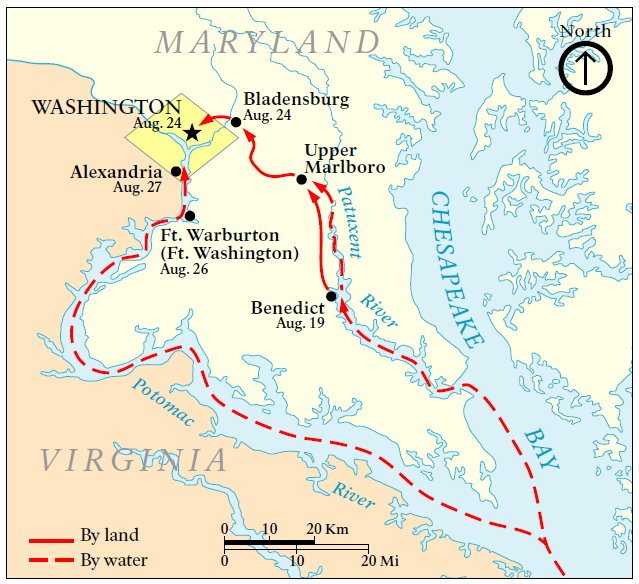
British Advance on Washington, August, 1814

When the British Army did land near Washington, General Armstrong finally took measures to protect the Capital. On August 22, 1814, Brigadier General Robert Young was ordered to move his 600 militia to the Washington-Piscataway road to defend the approach to the fort now being called Fort Washington. Commander of the Washington defenses, General William Winder, sent orders to Captain Dyson "to advance a guard up to the main road upon all the roads leading to the fort, and in the event of his being taken in the rear of the fort by the enemy, to blow up the fort and retire across the river." Thomas Tingey, Commander of the Navy Yard, proposed placing Marines at Fort Washington but was refused by General Winder who did not consider Fort Washington tenable.

On August 24, the British defeated the American army defending Washington at Bladensburg and captured and occupied the city. While British troops occupied Washington, there were only 56 men at Fort Warburton. The fort had 26 guns ranging from 50-pounder Columbiads to 6-pounder field pieces and over 3,000 pounds of cannon powder.

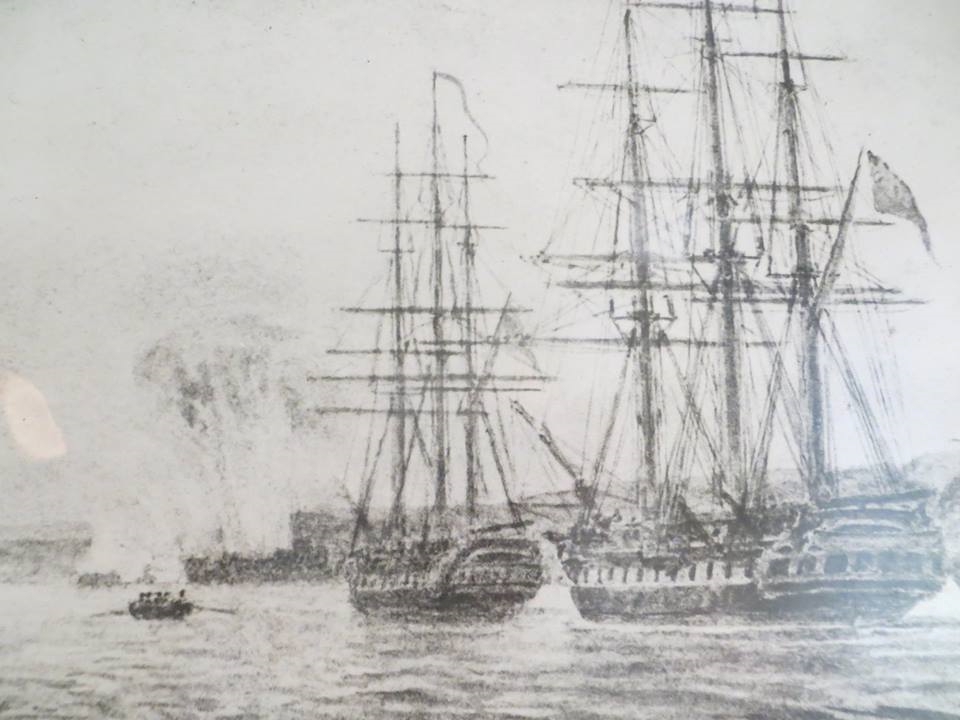
"Attack on Fort Washington on Potomac, 17 August 1814." Watercolor by Irwin John David Bevan

Only nine guns were capable of firing down river (many of the other cannons lacked implements). On the 27th, the British fleet of 10 ships approached the fort. Captain Gordon's report states that "A little before sunset the squadron anchored just out of gunshot; the bomb vessels at once took up their position to cover the frigates in the projected attack at daylight next morning and began throwing shells until about 7:00pm. The garrison, to our great surprise, retreated from the fort; and a short time afterward Fort Washington was blown up." The next morning the fleet paused in front of the fort, completed the destruction, then sailed to and captured the city of Alexandria, Virginia, just a few miles upriver.

Captain Dyson was subsequently relieved of his command and ordered to his home in Alexandria. A court martial found him guilty of abandoning his post and destroying government property. He was dismissed from the service, but received no other punishment. The Secretary of War, General Armstrong, was forced to retire and abandon his ambition to become president because of his failure to protect the Capital.

=== Post-destruction to 1860 ===
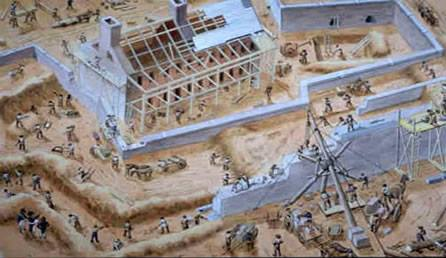
Artist's rendering of the construction of the second Fort Washington

Within less than a month of its demolition, Fort Washington began to be rebuilt. The project was directed by James Monroe, acting secretary of war, who again hired Pierre Charles L'Enfant. As work progressed, however, the threat diminished. Concern about the defenses of Washington had lessened considerably by the time news arrived that a peace treaty had been signed in Ghent, Belgium, on December 24, 1814, and that American troops had handily defeated the British at the Battle of New Orleans, January 8, 1815.

Even before the Treaty of Ghent, Monroe had begun to rein in L'Enfant. In November 1814 he questioned L'Enfant's removal of some of the old fort and asked for greater economy. L'Enfant was told to submit reports on the work in progress and to prepare detailed plans of the new fort for the War Department. Believing he had been insulted, L' Enfant refused to comply. On July 18, 1815, work was halted and two months later, on September 15, L'Enfant was dismissed. He was replaced by Lt. Col. Walker Armistead of the U.S. Army Corps of Engineers, who, within a few weeks, presented the first detailed plans of the proposed work.

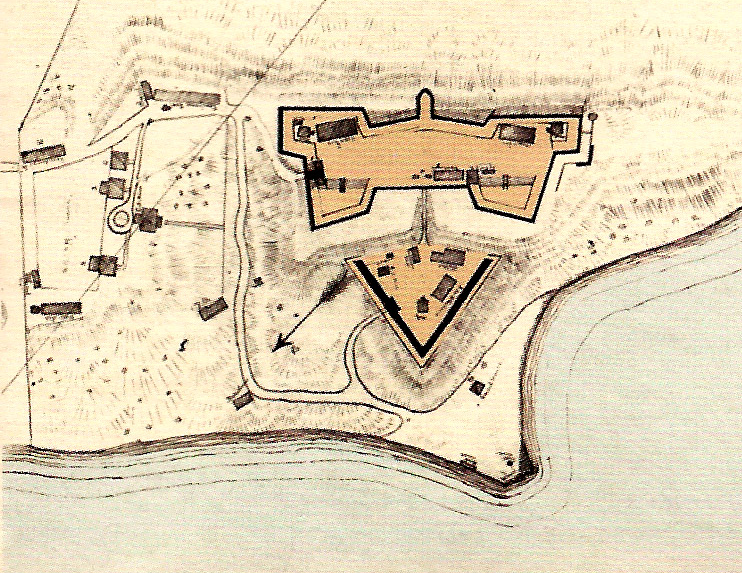
Drawing of Second Fort Washington when completed in 1824

Construction of the new brick fort progressed steadily under the direction of Armistead's assistant, Capt. T.W. Maurice. On October 2, 1824, the fort was declared finished, though as yet unarmed. It had cost $426,000.

In the 1840s the fort underwent an extensive remodeling program to bring it up to the standards of the third generation of coastal fortifications. Work crews constructed 88 permanent gun platforms (though the first guns were not emplaced until 1846), increased the height of the east wall, rebuilt the drawbridge, strengthened the powder magazines, and added a caponier to protect the approaches from Piscataway Creek.

Growing shortages in the number of personnel after the Mexican War stretched the resources of the U.S. Army. At Fort Washington, as at many other posts, the garrison was withdrawn leaving only a skeleton maintenance staff. In fact, between 1853 and 1861, only one soldier, Ordnance Sergeant Joseph Cameron, was stationed full-time at the fort.

=== 1861 to 1865 ===
As sectional differences increased and the country moved closer to the horror of civil war, Fort Washington found itself in a precarious position: near the Nation's Capital, across the river from the most populous slave state, and itself in a slave state with a large secessionist following. By February 1861, after South Carolina and six other states had declared their independence from the United States, the possibility loomed that Virginia would also secede, making the fort's geographic position critical. Other observers saw a threat from the southern sympathizers residing in Prince George's County, Maryland, where the fort was located.

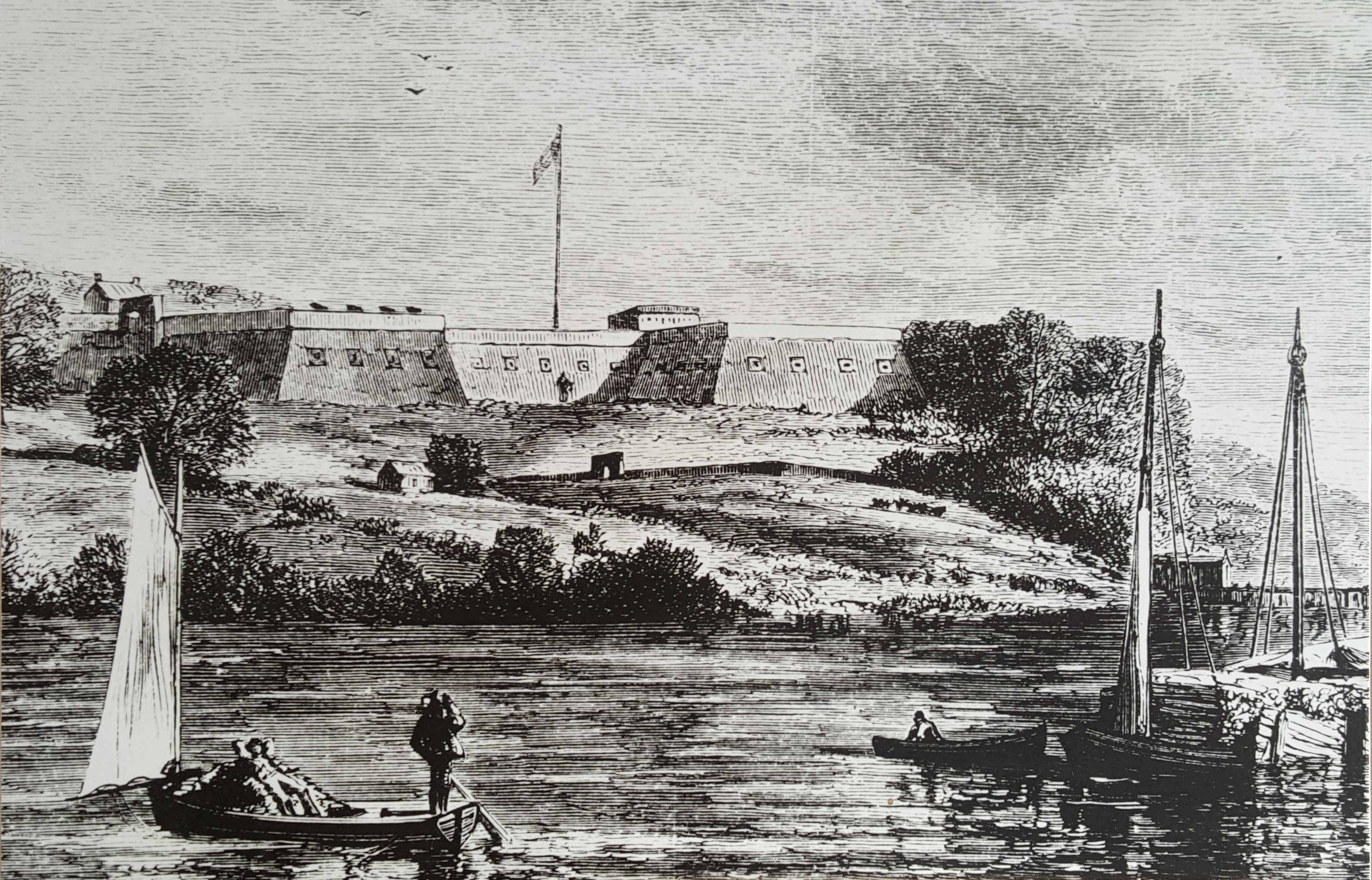
Drawing of Fort Washington as it appeared during the Civil War

On January 1, 1861, Secretary of the Navy Isaac Toucey issued an order for the defense of the capital. The task of putting the defenses in order fell to an Army engineer officer, Lt. George Washington Custis Lee, son of Col. Robert E. Lee. By early May 1861 both Lees would resign their commissions in the U.S. Army and offer their services to their home state, Virginia.

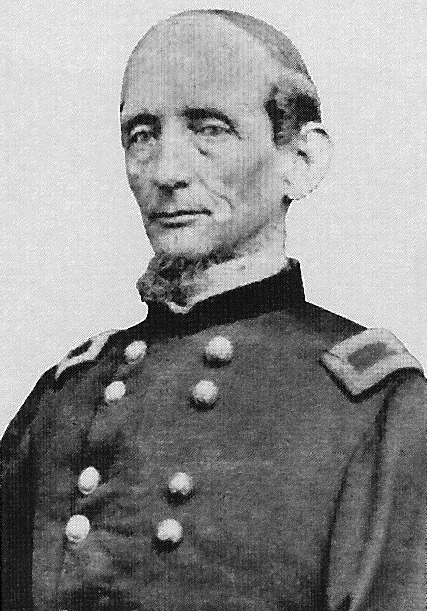
Capt. Joseph A. Haskin, shown as a brigadier general, commander of Fort Washington during the Civil War

On January 5, 1861, Ordnance Sergeant Joseph Cameron asked for troops to be sent to Fort Washington. The next day, Captain Algernon S. Taylor and 40 U.S. Marines arrived from the Navy Yard to hold the fort until trained artillery units could be sent. Taylor feared that the 40 Marines were not enough and asked for reinforcements. On January 26, 1861, a company of U.S. Army recruits relieved the Marines. On April 15, the day after Fort Sumter surrendered in Charleston harbor, the War Department sent Company D of the 1st U.S. Artillery to Fort Washington. It was commanded by Capt. Joseph A. Haskin, who had arrived in Washington from Baton Rouge, La., where he had been forced to surrender the federal arsenal and barracks to local secessionists earlier in the year.

For a time Fort Washington was the only defense for the national capital, and it was vitally important, for it controlled movement on the river. Quickly, however, Maj. Gen. John G. Barnard of the Corps of Engineers directed the building of a string of 68 enclosed earthen forts and batteries to protect all approaches to Washington. By the end of the war, 20 miles of rifle pits and more than 30 miles of military roads encircled the city. Ultimately, the fort did not see any action during the war, as it was not a factor in any land campaign and the Confederate Navy never attempted to raid the city from the Potomac River.

=== 1872 to 1889 ===
At the end of the Civil War, federal officials took a close look at the nation's coastal defense system. They found that U.S. coastal waters were vulnerable to ships carrying 12-inch guns and of less than 24-foot draft. In short, the U.S. coastline was vulnerable to the world's major naval powers—Great Britain, France, Russia, Germany, Denmark, Argentina, Brazil, Chile, and Austria-Hungary.

In 1872 the U.S. Army Corps of Engineers began to prepare new defenses. Between 1873 and 1875, four 15-inch Rodman guns and a magazine were partially constructed. Work ceased in 1875 when money was no longer available. In 1887, President Cleveland found a treasury surplus. Two years earlier, a Board of Engineers, presided over by Secretary of War William C. Endicott, recommended a new system of seacoast defense that employed heavy steel breech-loading rifled guns, large mortars, rapid fire guns and underwater mines. The entire plan called for the installation of the new defenses at 27 sites along our coast and rivers.

Work did not begin on the new system until Benjamin Harrison became president in 1889. The Fifty-first Congress found a solution to the treasury surplus that had plagued Cleveland during the last two years of his Administration. New public buildings, river improvements and even a pension for the Civil War veterans, that had been promised but not delivered, were among the spending bills introduced and passed by the Congress. Some of the surplus money, $1,221,000 in 1890 and $750,000 in 1891 was appropriated for coast defenses.

The Endicott Board's recommendation for the defense of Washington was thirteen 10 and 12-inch guns and 150 submarine mines. They were to be placed at Fort Washington, Maryland and Sheridan Point (later Fort Hunt), Virginia at an estimated cost of 1.3 million dollars.

=== 1890 to 1898 ===
On January 11, 1890, a Board of Engineers was ordered to investigate and submit a project for the defense of Washington. They recommended that most of the defenses be constructed at Fort Washington. Part of their plan was for an underground mine control room to be built on the north end of the fort. Work on the new defenses began with the Mining Casemate, an underground room for firing electrically detonated mines. The following year ground was broken for Battery Decatur, named after Commodore Stephen Decatur, naval hero of the Barbary Wars and War of 1812 and a native of Maryland, but was suspended to await final design of the 10-inch disappearing carriage. Construction resumed in 1896 and the guns were mounted in early 1897. Work at Battery Emory, named for Major General William H. Emory, commenced in 1897.

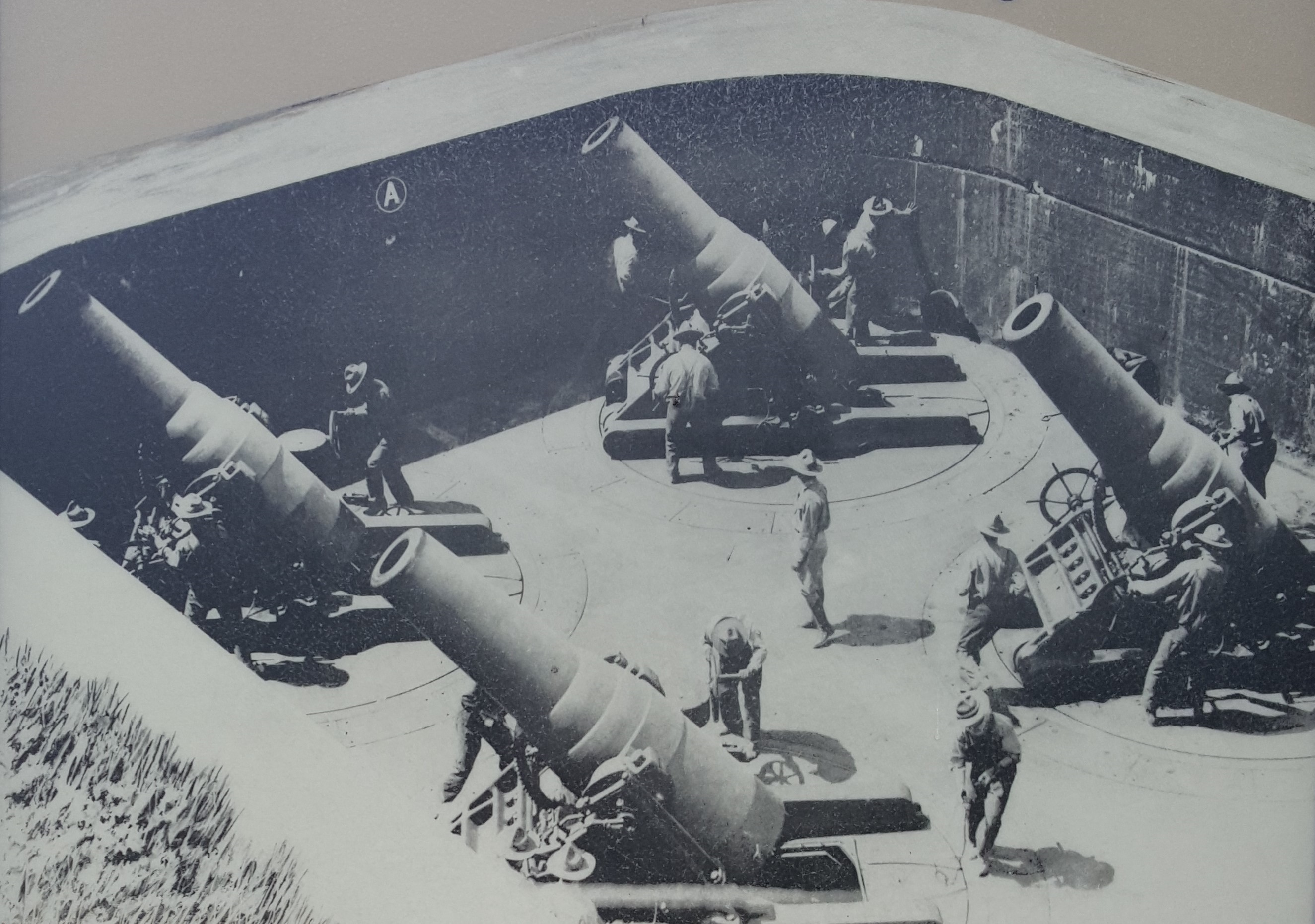
12-inch Mortars at Battery Meigs

Battery Humphreys was started in 1898 and named for Major General Andrew A. Humphreys. The 12-inch mortar battery, designed to direct vertical fire at the thin decks of modern warships, was named for Major General Montgomery C. Meigs and started in 1898. It originally had eight 12-inch mortars but later two mortars were removed from each pit. The three rapid-fire batteries at Fort Washington mounted two guns each: Battery White was started in 1898, Smith in 1899 and James Many in 1902. Lieutenant Colonel Peter C. Haines, president of the Engineer Board planning the defense of Washington described the purpose of the works in a letter of June 26, 1891: "The defensive works at Fort Washington are designed to prevent a hostile fleet from reaching positions within bombarding distance of the Capitol and the Washington Navy Yard. It is scarcely within the range of possibilities that any other than a naval attack would be made on this position. The defenses are therefore designed to resist such attack only."

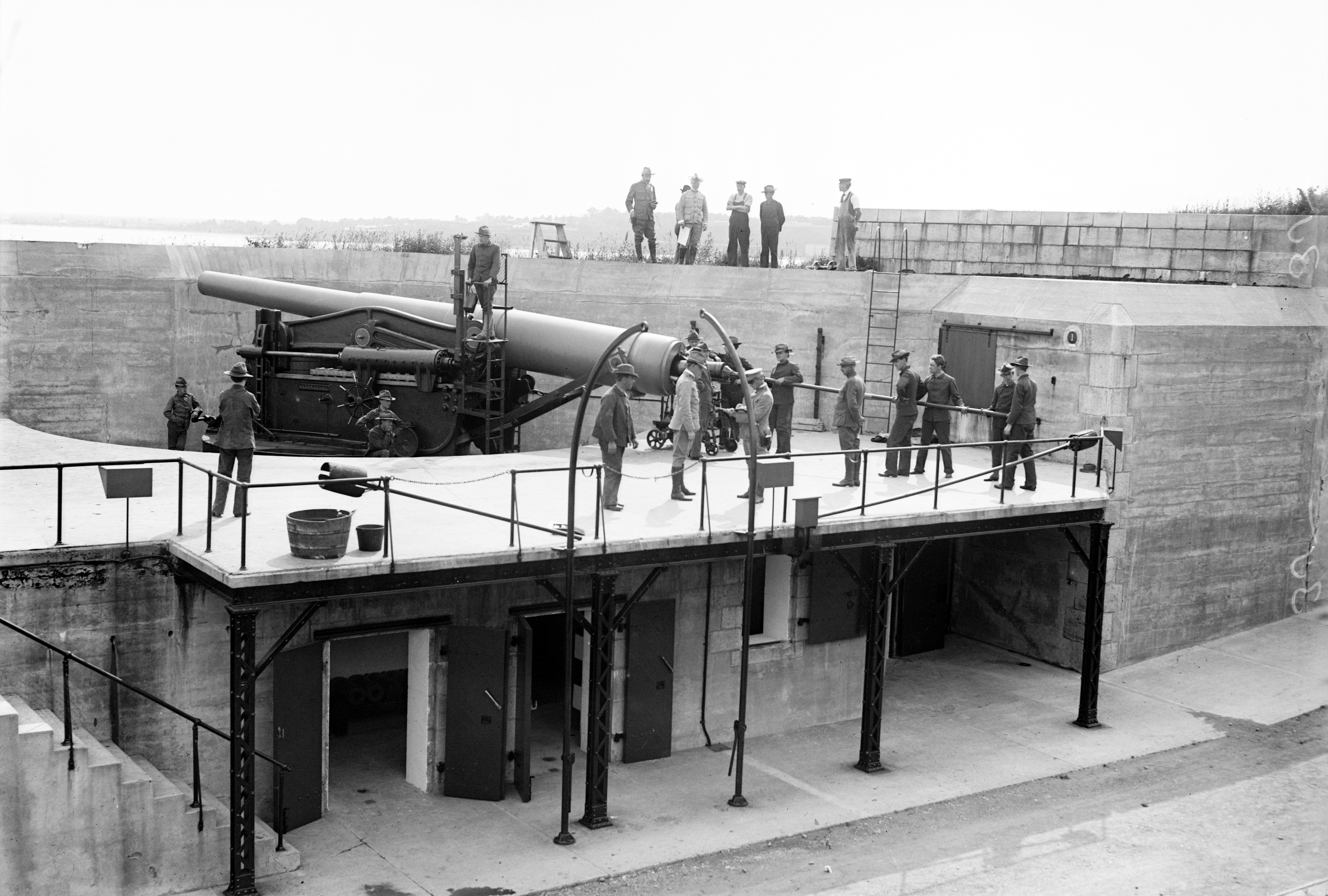
10-inch M1895 gun at Fort Hamilton, NY, representative of the guns emplaced at Battery Decatur.

In April 1898 the USS Maine exploded in Havana harbor and the United States became engaged in the Spanish–American War. Up to this time, work on the entire coastal defense system had been slow and only a few of the gun batteries were completed. Work began immediately, so that any possible attack by Spanish warships could be met. Two of the 15-inch Rodman cannon in the ravelin were dismounted and a concrete battery was built for rapid-fire guns. Electricity and telephones were installed in the batteries, and the 10-inch gun planned for firing at the experimental battery was placed on a barbette carriage near Battery Humphreys. A minefield was also laid down in the Potomac, the only time this has ever been done.

The first military unit to serve the new guns at Fort Washington was Company A, 4th U.S. Artillery who were assigned to Battery Decatur on July 21, 1897. In 1901, Company A was re-designated 37th Company, Coast Artillery Corps and remained at the post until 1904. Other units stationed at Fort Washington included the 44th, 104th and 116th Companies of Coast Artillery.

=== 1898 to 1940 ===
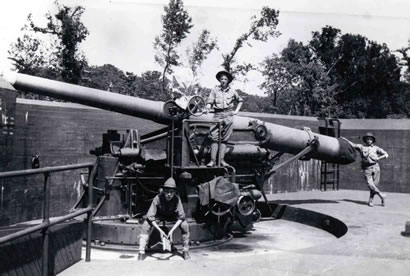
6-inch M1897 Gun crew in the 1920s

On July 3, 1898, the U.S. Navy destroyed the Spanish fleet at Santiago, Cuba, and for all practical purposes the Spanish–American War was over. The mines were removed from the Potomac River, and later that year the 10-inch gun mounted near Battery Humphreys was moved to a new mount to test a wood and iron parapet that had been built shortly before the outbreak of war. In June 1899, what became known as the Alger test was conducted by firing one of these guns into a parapet designed by the secretary of war. The results of the test concluded that concrete provided a more effective barrier against rifled artillery than any other design then available to engineers.

In July 1899 Batteries Decatur, Emory, Humphreys, and White were officially turned over to the artillery commander of the fort, which became part of the Coast Defenses of the Potomac. Although in the hands of the artillery since their construction, they had been the property of the engineers. During World War I, the guns of Battery Decatur were removed and shipped to Fort Monroe, Va., where they were then shipped to Europe for use in France.

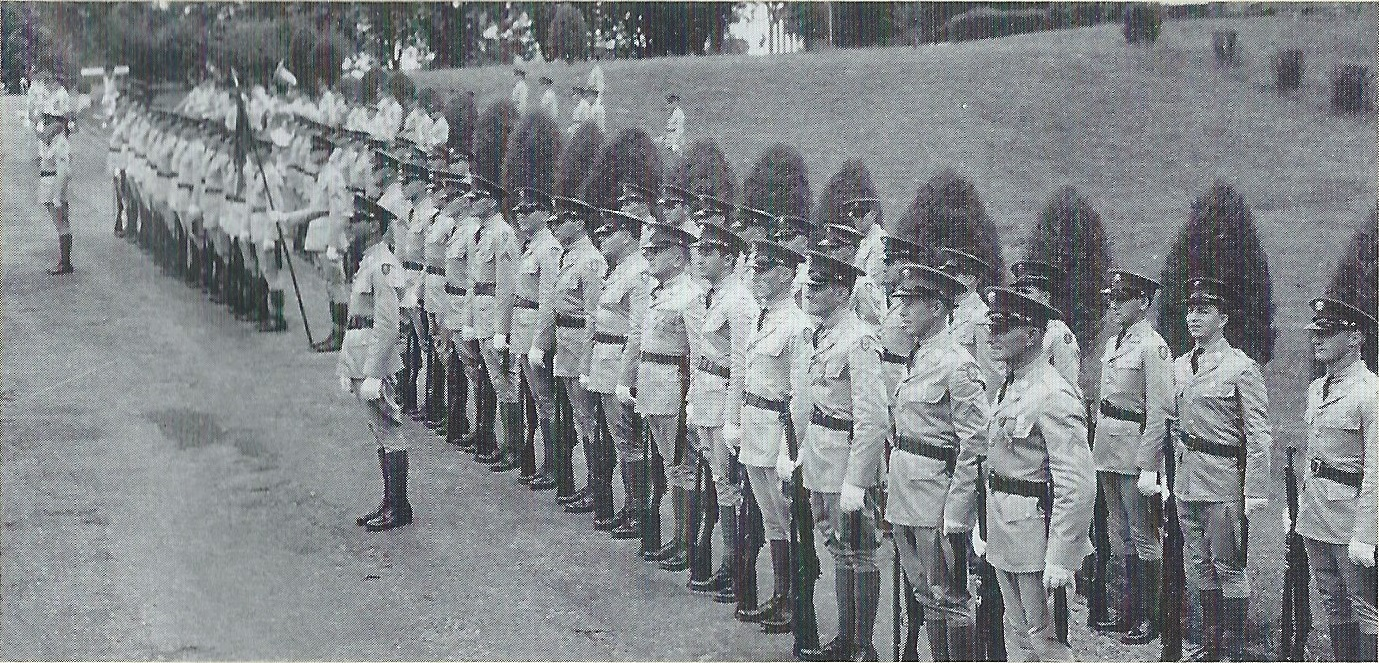
A 1935 honor guard awaits the arrival of the assistant secretary of war

Fort Washington was garrisoned by the 260th Coast Artillery Regiment of the District of Columbia National Guard Coast Artillery, and a number of military units were organized at the post, including the 8th Provisional Artillery Battalion, then sent to France where they became the 53rd Artillery (Railway), Coast Artillery Corps. In 1924 the coast defense commands were renamed "harbor defense commands". After World War I several harbor defense commands were disarmed, and this included Fort Washington by 1929.

On May 29, 1930, Fort Washington Park was established by Congress as a terminal of a proposed but never built section of the George Washington Memorial Parkway. However, the transfer of the fort from military to civilian use did not physically happen until 1939. From June 1922 to June 1939, the 3rd Battalion 12th Infantry occupied Fort Washington. The fort's primary function was as a city garrison for Washington. Its soldiers participated in a variety of state occasions—parades, ceremonies, and funerals—throughout these years. In 1939 the 3rd Battalion moved to Fort Myer near Arlington Cemetery. That same year the fort was transferred to the Department of the Interior and a Civilian Conservation Corps barracks was built. Also in 1939, the site was proposed for use as a terminal point for a bridge across the Potomac from Virginia and a parkway to be built northward along the shore.

=== 1941 to present ===
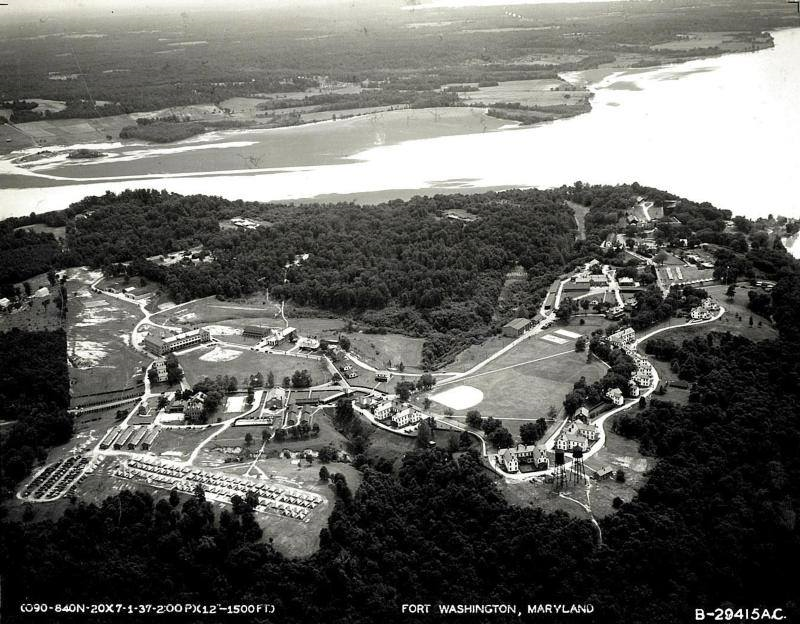
Aerial photo of the facilities at Fort Washington in 1937

After the attack on Pearl Harbor, December 7, 1941, the nation quickly turned from peacetime activities to meeting the demands of wartime. Already-existing facilities were pressed into service, and Fort Washington was returned to the Department of War for use during World War II. During this period, further expansion of the post took place with the construction of additional buildings to house students and to provide support services for training military personnel.

The Adjutant General School moved to the fort in January 1942. It trained Army officers in administration and personnel classification duties. The school turned out 300 trained officers every 60 days. Part of the Adjutant General's School was an Officer Candidate School that graduated 25 men in the first class and thereafter turned out 20 new officers every three months.

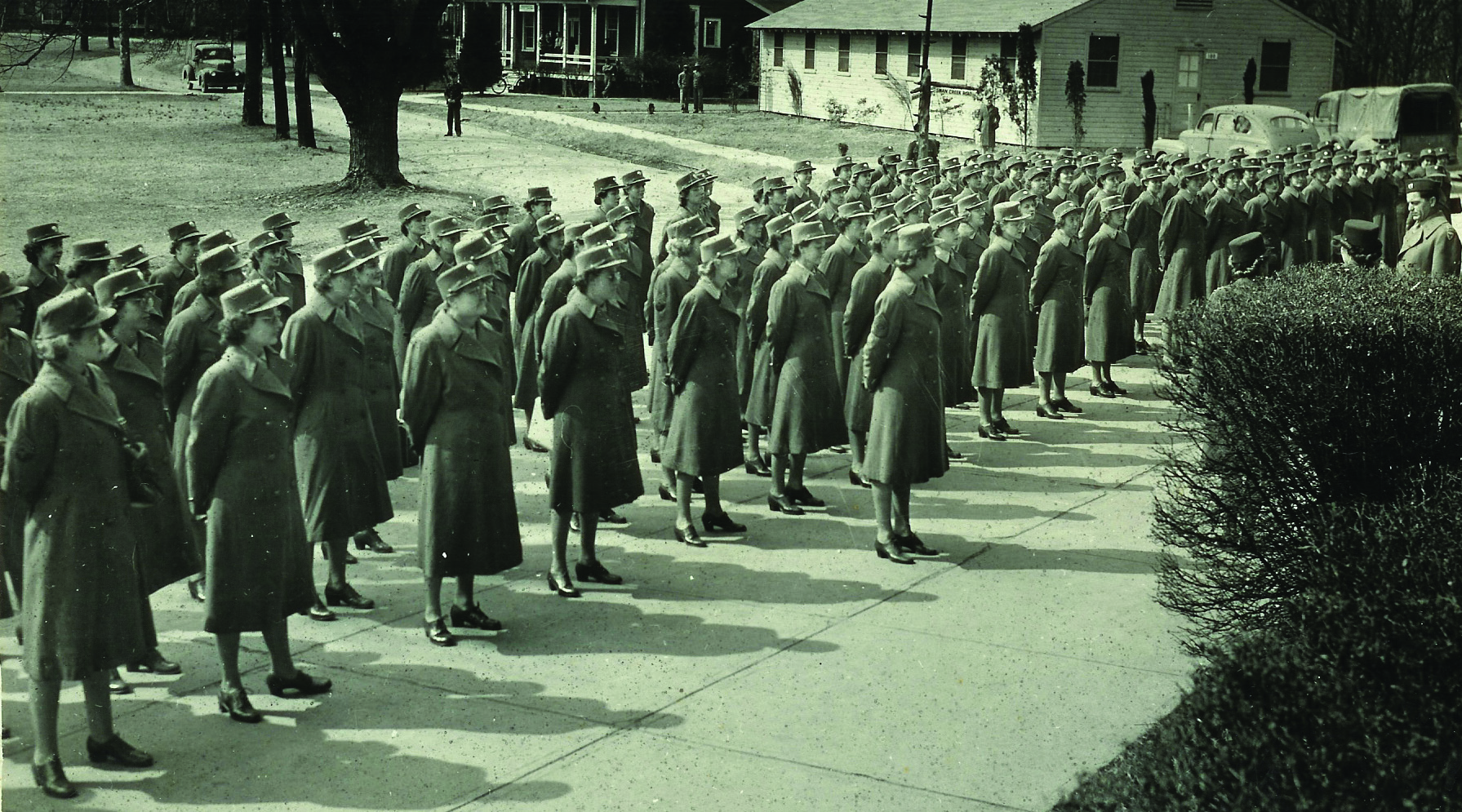
67th WAAC Detachment at Fort Washington

On March 3, 1943, the 67th WAAC Detachment reported to Fort Washington and became part of the Adjutant General's School's Service Company. They were assigned administrative, communications and transportation functions to replace men who were needed overseas. Most of Fort Washington's women received their basic training at Daytona Beach, Florida, but a few had been trained at other centers. The workdays were long, usually 12 to 16 hours, and every Friday there was a dress parade after work. Saturday mornings began with a formal parade and inspection, but service at Fort Washington was not all work, there was some time for rest and relaxation. The base swimming pool was a popular activity during the summer and a military bus ran from the front gate to Washington. There was a dance at the club every Friday evening.

Toward the end of the war, the Veterans Administration used part of the area and other buildings as public housing. In 1946 the fort once again reverted to the Department of the Interior. Many of the buildings from the interwar period were removed. Since that time it has been a public park commemorating the long history of coastal fortifications and serving as a recreational area for history buffs, naturalists, and other park visitors.

== Modern use ==
The visitor center, located in the yellow house on the hill in front of the fort, contains exhibits describing Fort Washington as the guardian of the nation's capital. An audiovisual program also offers materials on the fort. There is a 3-mile trail that follows the perimeter of the park boundary. Birdwatchers frequent the park, and fishing is available along the Potomac River.

Fort Washington Is open year-round. The park grounds are open from 8 am to sunset. The historic fort and the visitor center are open from 9 am to 4 pm during winter months and 9 am to 5 pm during the summer months. Alcohol is prohibited in the park. Dogs are allowed but must be on a 6-foot leash and under the control of owner. One Sunday a month from April to October the park has Civil War artillery demonstrations.

Photos of Fort Washington, MD
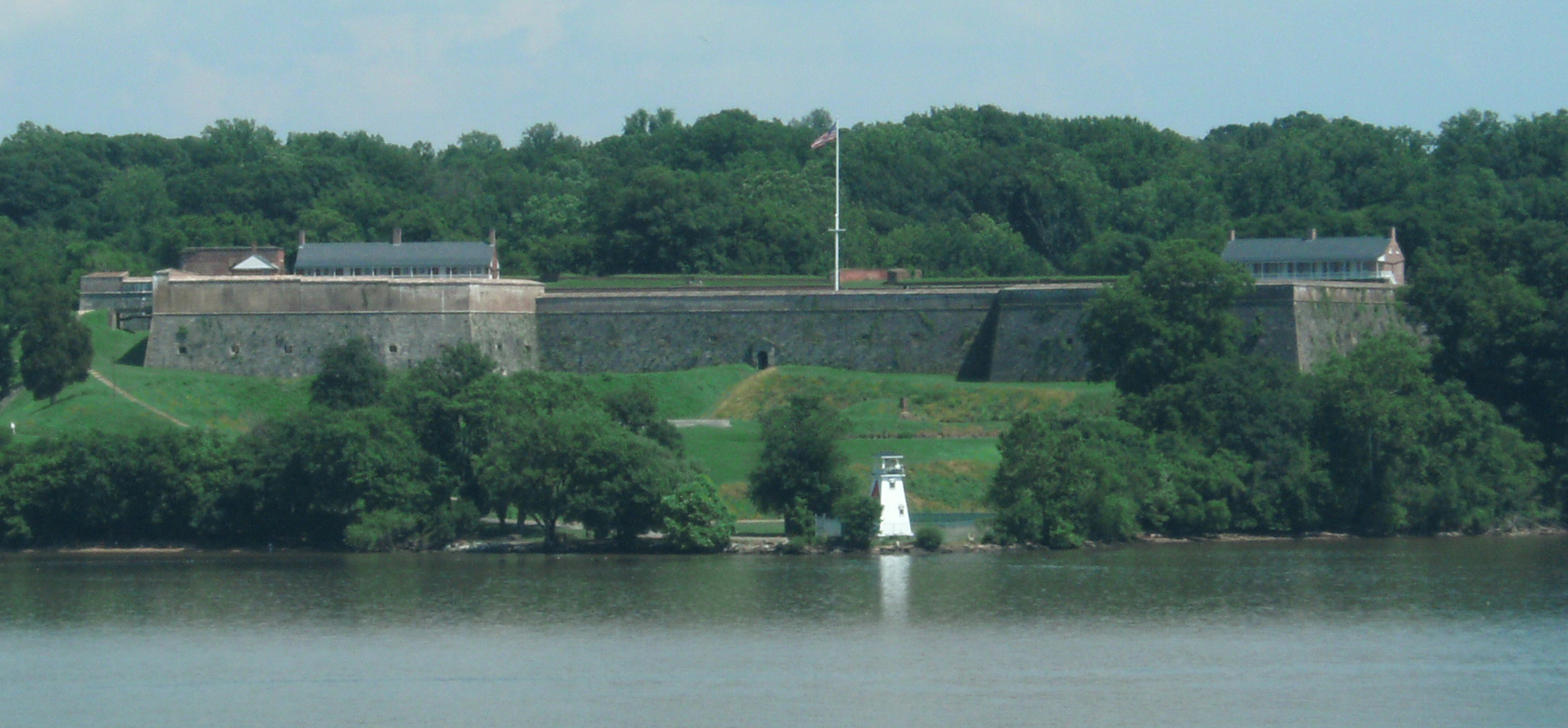
Fort Washington, seen from across the Potomac River.

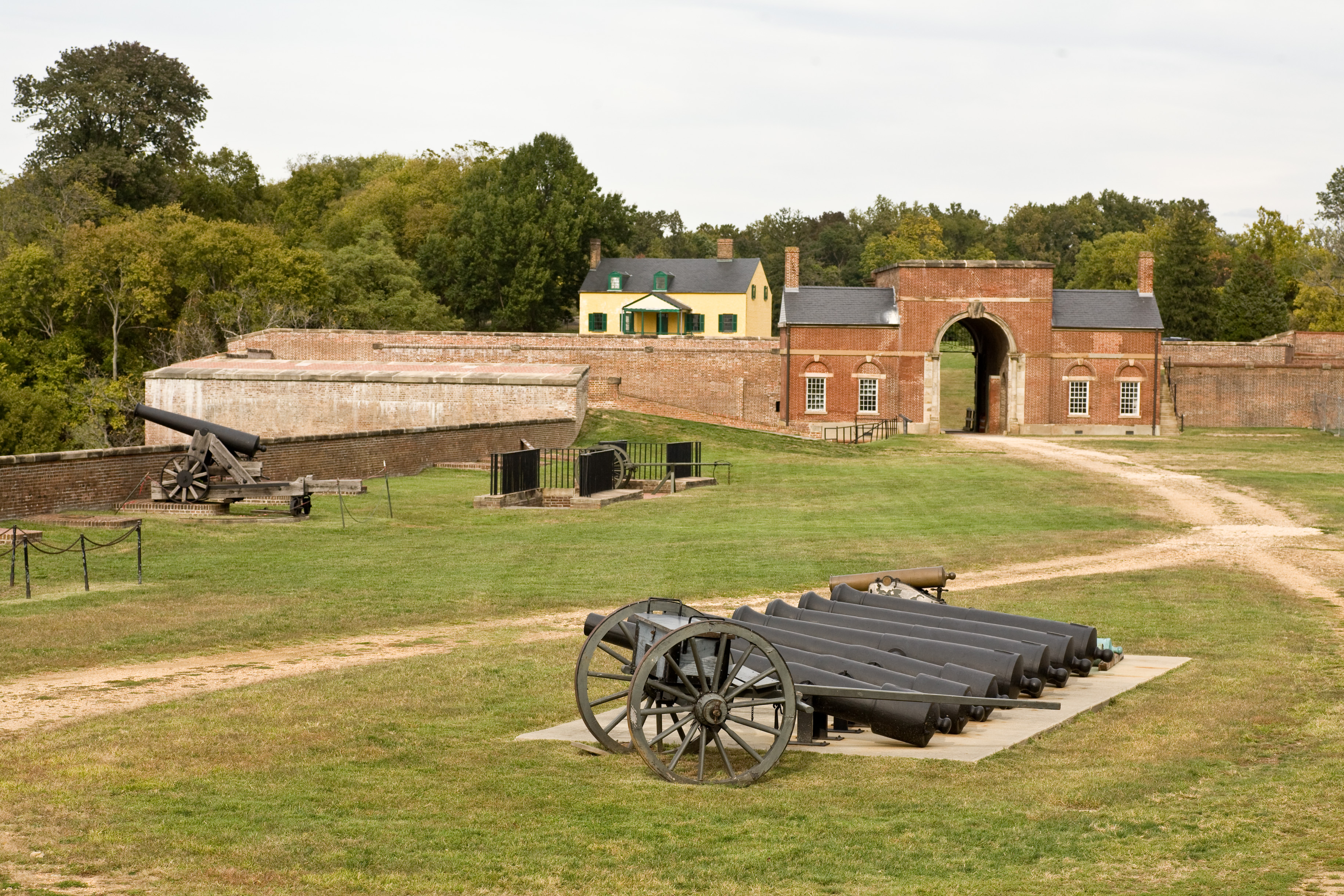
Fort Washington MD courtyard.
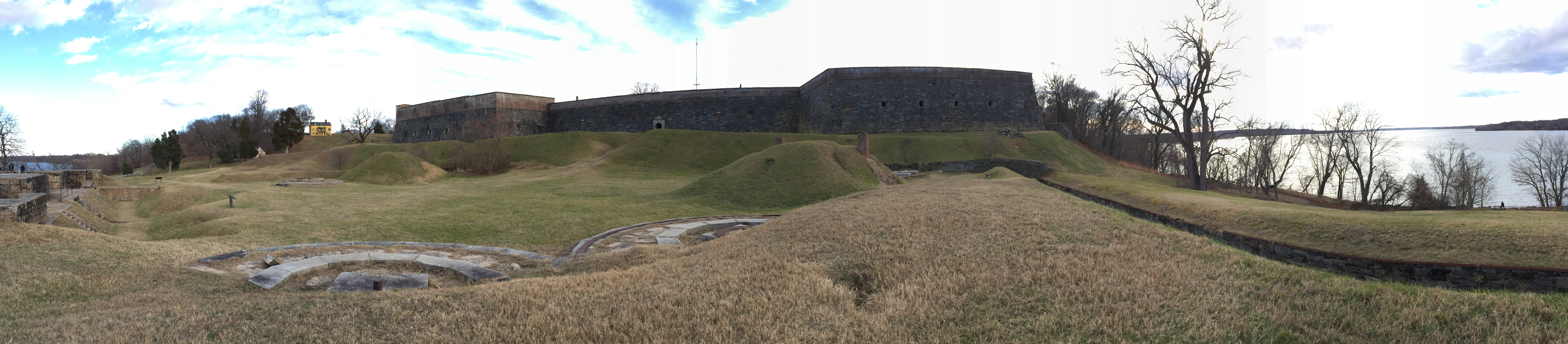
Panoramic image of the exterior of Fort Washington
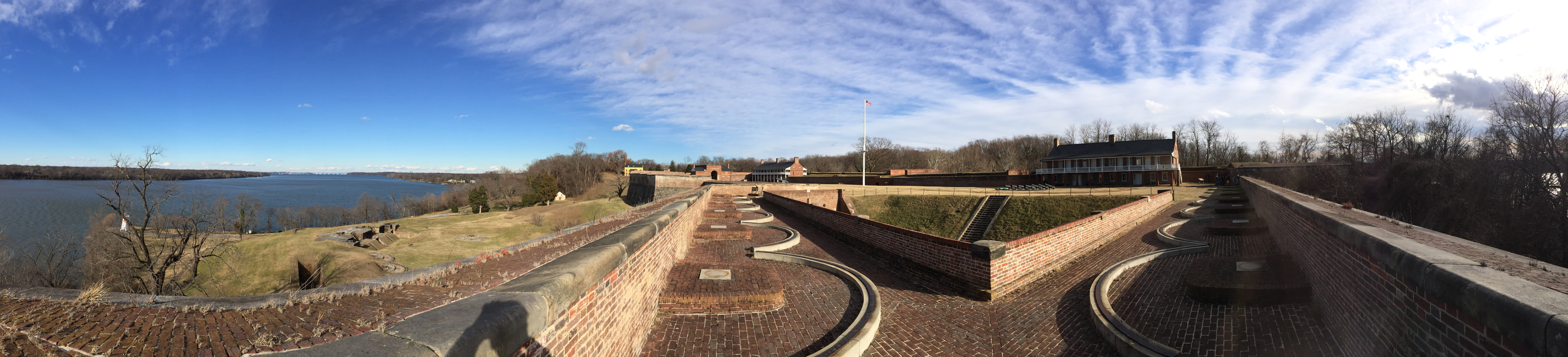
Panoramic image of the interior courtyard of Fort Washington

== See also ==
- Civil War Defenses of Washington
- Washington, D.C., in the American Civil War
- List of coastal fortifications of the United States
- Seacoast defense in the United States
- United States Army Coast Artillery Corps
- Harbor Defense Command
