= Joseph A. Haskin =

United States Army general (1818–1874)

Joseph Abel Haskin
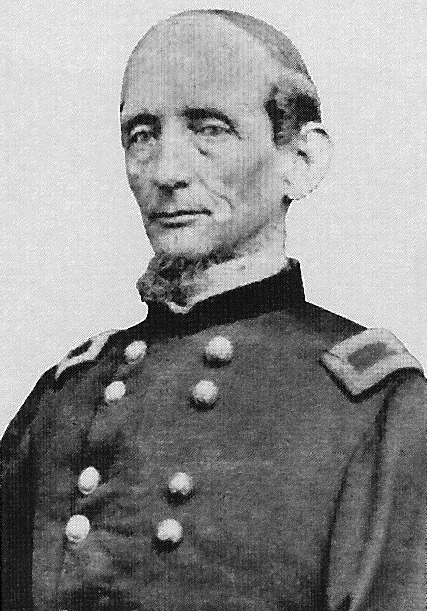
- Born: June 21, 1818; Troy, New York, US
- Died: August 3, 1874 (aged 56); Oswego, New York, US
- Burial place: Arlington National Cemetery
- Military career
- Allegiance: United States of America; Union
- Branch: United States Army; Union Army
- Service years: 1839–1870
- Rank: Brigadier General
- Conflicts: Mexican–American War; Battle of Cerro Gordo; Battle of Chapultepec; American Civil War; Battle of Fort Stevens

Joseph Abel Haskin (June 21, 1818 – August 3, 1874) was a career officer in the United States Army. A veteran of the Mexican–American War and American Civil War, he attained the rank of brigadier general.

== Biography ==
Joseph A. Haskin was born in Troy, New York on June 21, 1818, a son of William Phelps Haskin (1787-1855) and Sarah "Sally" (Slade) Haskin (1791-1856). He was raised and educated in Troy, where his father served in appointed and elected offices including sheriff of Rensselaer County.

In 1839 Haskin graduated from the United States Military Academy at West Point as 10th out of a class of 31 and was commissioned as 2nd lieutenant in the 1st U.S. Artillery. At the outbreak of the Mexican-American War he was a 1st lieutenant and received brevet promotions to captain for Cerro Gordo and major for Chapultepec. He was severely wounded during the battle Chapultepec which resulted in the loss of his left arm. At the close of the war Haskin was promoted to captain as a staff officer in the quartermaster's department. In 1851 he was promoted to captain in the 1st U.S. Artillery.

Haskin was in command of the Baton Rouge Barracks when the Civil War began. He was forced to surrender on January 10, 1861 to the Confederate forces in Louisiana. He was exchanged and assigned to the staff of John E. Wool with the rank of lieutenant colonel. For the majority of the war Haskin served as a brigade and division commander in the Department of Washington manning the Defenses of Washington D.C. In 1864 Haskin was in command of the defenses north of the Potomac in the XXII Corps when General Jubal A. Early's Confederate army approached Washington D.C. Haskin had roughly 4,000 troops to man the fortifications within Washington itself. On July 8 General Martin D. Hardin was assigned to take over command from Haskin who reverted to command of the 2nd brigade. During the Battle of Fort Stevens Haskin's brigade occupied the line from Fort Slocum to Fort Totten. For the remainder of the war he was in command of the XXII Corps' artillery. In recognition for his service in the defenses of Washington Haskin was promoted to brigadier general in the volunteer services. He also received brevet promotions to colonel and brigadier general in the U.S. Army in 1865. Haskin retired on December 15, 1870. He was buried at Arlington National Cemetery.

Haskin's son William L. Haskin served as brigadier general in the U.S. Army. His daughter Katherine was the wife of Brigadier General Marcus P. Miller. His daughter Frances was the wife of Brigadier General Crosby P. Miller.
