= List of the oldest buildings in Michigan =

This article attempts to list the oldest extant buildings in the state of Michigan in the United States. Some dates are approximate and based upon dendochronology, architectural studies, and historical records.

To be listed here a site must:

- date prior to 1850; or
- be the oldest building in a region, large city, or oldest of its type (church, government building, style, etc.)

== List ==
List of Oldest Buildings in Michigan
Name	Image	Location	Date of Construction	Type	Notes
Officer's Stone Quarters of Fort Mackinac		Mackinac Island	1780	Military	Oldest structure within the fort and oldest building in Michigan.
McGulpin House		Mackinac Island	c. 1780	Residential	Architectural style could predate 1780. Relocated in 1981. Rare example of French-Canadian architecture in Michigan. Oldest house in Michigan.
Biddle House		Mackinac Island	c. 1780	Residential/fur trading	Restored in 1959.
William Tucker Residence		Harrison Township	C.1784	Residential	After being kidnapped and raised by a local Chippewa tribe from age eleven to age eighteen, William Tucker was given 18 square miles of land by the tribe, who later helped him build a log cabin on the land to become his residence. The home has since been refaced with brick, but parts of the original structure remain intact beneath.
Navarre-Anderson Trading Post		Frenchtown Charter Township	1789	Trading post	Oldest building in the Lower Peninsula of Michigan.
Cookhouse at Navarre-Anderson Trading Post complex		Frenchtown Charter Township	1810	Cookhouse, food preparation	
Robert Stuart House		Mackinac Island	1817	Residential	Home of American Fur Company agent Robert Stuart.
John Johnston House		Sault Ste. Marie	1822	Residential	Home of North West Company fur trader John Johnston. Oldest building in the Upper Peninsula of Michigan.
John W. Hunter House		Birmingham	1822	Residential	
James H. Murray House		Linden	c. 1823	Residential	Greek Revival house of James H. Murray.
Mission House		Mackinac Island	1825	School/residential	Missionary constructed by William Montague Ferry and operated by the American Board of Commissioners for Foreign Missions to spread Christianity to Native Americans.
Sheldon Inn		Canton	1825	Residential/inn	
Fort Gratiot Light		Port Huron	1825	Lighthouse	First lighthouse constructed in Michigan.
Edward Loranger House		Frenchtown Charter Township	1825	Residential	Considered to be one of the oldest unaltered structures in Michigan.
Charles Trowbridge House		Detroit	1826	Residential	Oldest documented building in the city of Detroit.
Musgrove Evans House		Tecumseh	1826	Residential	Oldest building in Lenawee County.
Elmwood		Sault Ste. Marie	1827	Indian Affairs	Relocated and renovated in 1979.
William Starkweather House		Plymouth	1828	Residential	Built by Plymouth's first settler, William Starkweather, the house at 150 S. Union Street, is the oldest house in Plymouth. It is still functional and occupied.
Mission Church		Mackinac Island	1829	Religious	Oldest surviving church In Michigan.
Barn at Joshua Simmons' farm		Livonia	1829	Farm building	First barn constructed in Livonia.
Wing–Allore House		Monroe	1829	Residential	Former home of Austin Eli Wing and his descendants. Now a funeral parlor.
Ward-Holland House		Marine City	1830	Residential	Former home of shipbuilders Samuel Ward and Robert Holland.
Funke-Bregger Livery		Bangor	1830	Residential	Former Stagecoach Livery
Land Office		White Pigeon	1831	Government	Former United States General Land Office agency on the Sauk Trail.
Caswell House		Troy	1832	Residential	
Murdoch Log House		Berrien Springs	1832	Residential	Original county seat of Berrien County.
Thunder Bay Island Light		Alpena	1832	Lighthouse	
Walker Tavern		Cambridge Township	c. 1832	Residential/tavern	
Commandant's Quarters		Dearborn	1833	Military	Originally a U.S. Army supply depot.
Bagley Inn		Bloomfield Hills	1833	Residential/tavern	
St. Mary's Church		Monroe	1834	Religious	
Joseph Campau House		Detroit	1835	Residential	
Governor John S. Barry House		Constantine	1835	Residential	
Marantette House		Mendon	1835	Residential	
Sharon Mill		Manchester	1835	Agricultural	
Raisin Valley Friends Meetinghouse		Adrian	1835	Religious	
Ticknor-Campbell House		Ann Arbor	1835	Residential	
Old Tavern Inn		Sumnerville	c. 1835	Tavern	Oldest business in Michigan
Hubbard-Kesby House		Milford	c. 1835	Residential	
Botsford Inn		Farmington	1836	Tavern	
Calkins law office		Grand Rapids	1836	law office	
Orrin White House		Ann Arbor	1836-1840	Residential	
St. Mark's Episcopal		Grand Rapids	1836	Religious	
Rogers Mansion		Wyoming MI	1836	Residential	Oldest house in Kent county.
Indian Dormitory		Mackinac Island	1837	Residential/school	Constructed as a dormitory for Native Americans visiting the Indian agency on Mackinac Island. Now known as the Richard and Jane Manoogian Mackinac Art Museum.
St. Ignace Mission		St. Ignace	1837	Religious	Oldest Roman Catholic church in Michigan. Relocated in 1954.
Franklin Cider Mill		Franklin	1837	Agricultural	
Trombley House		Bay City	c. 1837	Residential	Oldest frame house still standing in Bay County. Relocated to Veterans Memorial Park in 1981.
Andrews-Leggett House		Commerce Township	c. 1837	Residential	
Indian Dormitory		Mackinac Island	1838	Residential/ Governmental	
Rogers house		Wyoming, MI	1838-1839	Residential	originally built in 1838, burned down and rebuilt in 1839. https://www.mlive.com/news/grand-rapids/2015/05/the_rogers_mansion_said_to_be.html
Governor's Mansion		Marshall	1839	Residential	House built by Whig politician J. Wright Gordon in a campaign to make Marshall the state capital.
Berrien Springs Courthouse		Berrien Springs	1839	Governmental	Oldest courthouse in Michigan.
Judge Robert S. Wilson House		Ann Arbor	c. 1839	Residential	
South Manitou Island Lighthouse		South Manitou Island	1839-40	Lighthouse	
President's House, University of Michigan		Ann Arbor	1840	Residential	The oldest building at Michigan's oldest university, the University of Michigan.
Old Presque Isle Light		Presque Isle	1840	Lighthouse	
Smith's Chapel		Niles	1840	Religious	
Governor Robert McClelland House		Monroe	1841	Residential	Former home of Robert McClelland.
Joshua Simmons House		Livonia	1841	Residential	Another house on the farm may have been built in 1826
Dougherty Mission House		Old Mission	1842	Residential	Oldest frame building in Grand Traverse County and one of the oldest in northern Michigan.
Paw Paw City Hall		Paw Paw	1842	Government	Relocated in 1900.
St. Augustine Catholic Church		Hartland Township	1843	Religious	
Paine Bank		Niles	1843	Commercial	
Ladies' Literary Club Building		Ypsilanti	c. 1843	Residential	
Abram W. Pike House		Grand Rapids	1844	Residential	
Old Wing Mission		Holland	1844	Residential/ Religious	Originally a Presbyterian mission. Oldest house in Holland, Michigan.
Some buildings at Fort Wilkins Historic State Park		Copper Harbor	1844	Military	U.S. Army fort built to provide law enforcement and navigation on Lake Superior during the Michigan copper boom.
Ballard-Breakey House		Ypsilanti	1845	Residential	Construction may have started in 1830s
1244 Randolph		Detroit	c. 1845	Commercial	A rare surviving commercial building in Detroit dating from the 1840s.
Rudolph Nims House		Monroe	1846	Residential	
Lapeer County Courthouse		Lapeer	1846	Courthouse	Oldest registered property in Lapeer County.
Pillar Church		Holland	1847	Religious	
Sessions Schoolhouse		Ionia	1847	School	Often considered the oldest schoolhouse in Michigan. Restored in 1918.
Barracks of Fort Wayne		Detroit	1848	Military	Fortress constructed due to tensions with British Canada during the Patriot War and used during the American Civil War, the Spanish-American War, World War I, World War II, and much of the Cold War. Oldest remaining military structure in Detroit.
Sibley House		Detroit	1848	Residential	Original home of Solomon Sibley.
Saints Peter and Paul Church		Detroit	1848	Religious	Original cathedral of the Diocese of Detroit and campus of the University of Detroit-Mercy.
Mariners' Church		Detroit	1849	Religious	Episcopal parish church in Downtown Detroit serving foreign mariners on the Great Lakes.

== See also ==
- List of the oldest buildings in the United States
- National Register of Historic Places listings in Michigan
