= Clark Equipment Company =

American industrial equipment manufacturer

- Predecessor: George R. Rich Manufacturing Company
- Founded: 1916; 110 years ago
- Founder: Eugene B. Clark
- Headquarters: New York City, New York, United States
- Parent: Ingersoll Rand (1995–2007); Doosan International (2007–2021); HD Hyundai group (2021–Present)

Clark Equipment Company was an American designer, manufacturer, and seller of industrial and construction machinery and equipment.

== History ==
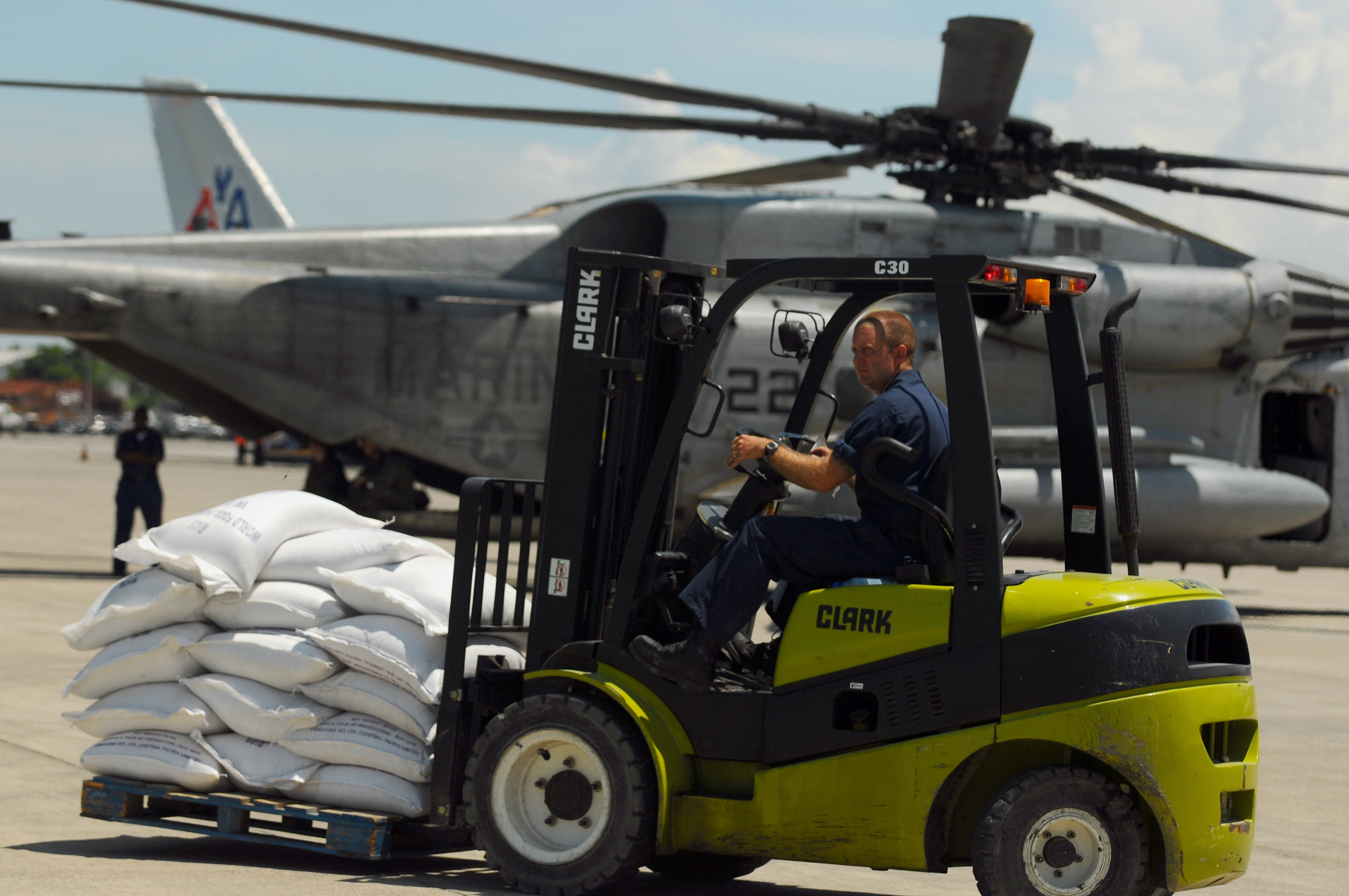
Clark forklift, September 13, 2008 in Port-au-Prince, Haiti

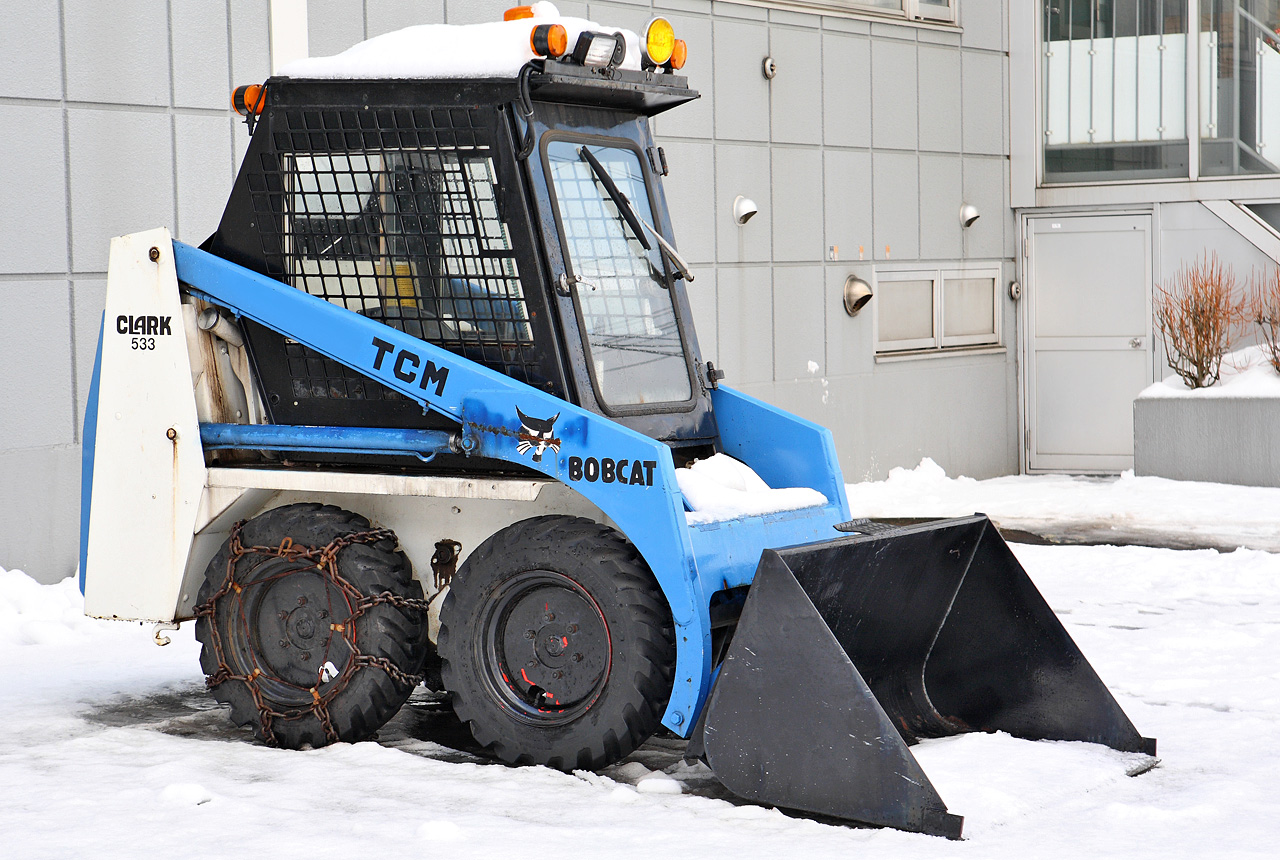
Clark Bobcat skid-steer loader

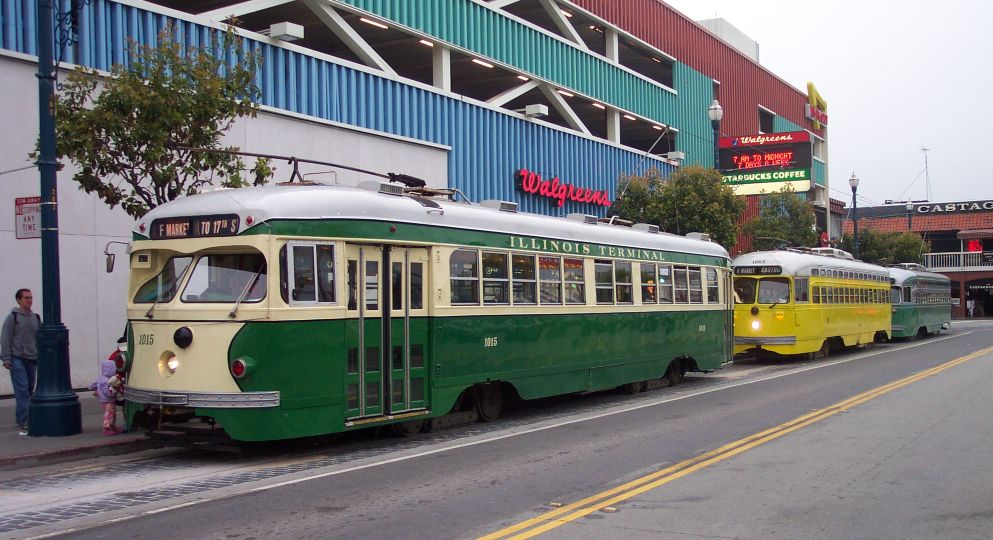
PCC streetcars, San Francisco F line

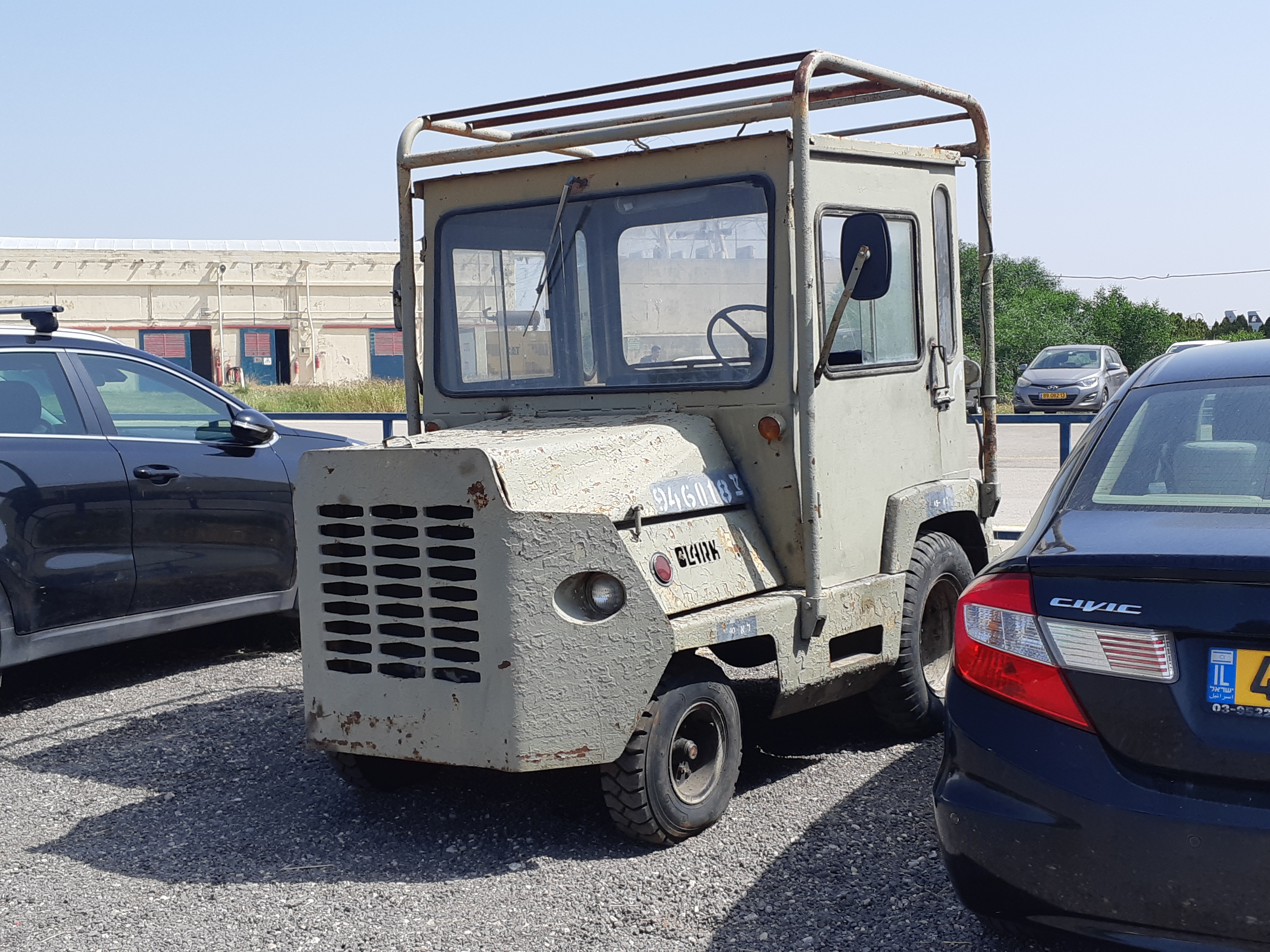
Clark CT-40 tractor in IAF base

Clark's predecessor was the George R. Rich Manufacturing Company, founded in 1903 in Chicago, Illinois by executives of the Illinois Steel Company. The company moved to Buchanan, Michigan in 1904 when that city's chamber of commerce advertised a financially sound deal with respect to industrial rent and power supply. Eugene B. Clark, an Illinois Steel employee at the time, determined that the metallurgy of Rich Manufacturing's principal product, a railroad rail drill named the Celfor Drill, was faulty, and also found fault with both the management and basic operations, which he ultimately corrected after the two parties established him becoming an equal partner. In 1916 he merged Rich Manufacturing, which by then had been renamed Celfor Tool, and Buchanan Electric Steel Company, an offshoot of the former, and formed Clark Equipment Company, named after Clark.

In 1919 a division called Clark Trucktractor Company was formed. This still exists as Clark Material Handling Company. From the 1920s until the 1960s, Clark made strategic acquisitions that opened access to new markets. In 1953 it purchased the Michigan Power Shovel Co and developed a new division dedicated to large scale earthmoving equipment. Further notable acquisitions included Hancock Manufacturing Company from Lubbock, Texas, in 1966, which manufactured scraper bowls., and Melroe Manufacturing Co. (now known as Bobcat Company).

Since Clark was one of the participants in the development of the PCC streetcar in the 1930s, they produced 80% of the bogies for this type of trolleycar. In 1935–1936, Clark built a one-of-a-kind aluminum body trolley for a PCC streetcar that ran in Brooklyn and Queens, New York, until 1956. This trolley is preserved at the Trolley Museum of New York and is listed on the New York State Register of Historic Places.

In 1954, Clark Equipment opened a plant in Valinhos, Brazil, to produce gears and truck transmissions for the South American Market. That plant also produces lifts and construct machinery. The Brazilian plant was sold to Eaton Corporation.

It continued to grow as a company, but in the 1960s and again in the 1980s, many were sold. In 1982 the company sold its wheel loader and dozer division to Volvo.

In 1995, Clark was acquired by Ingersoll Rand. Also in 1995, Ingersoll Rand sold Clark Equipment's mechanical test laboratory which still operates as Clark Testing today in Buchanan, Mi. In 1996, Ingersoll Rand donated two tons of Clark archives to the Berrien County Historical Association, and the Berrien County 1839 Courthouse Museum is now the Clark archives repository.

In 2007, Ingersoll Rand sold Clark Equipment Company to Doosan International of South Korea. The sale included the Construction Equipment Group of Ingersoll Rand. In July 2021, Doosan Infracore was acquired by Hyundai Heavy Industries, which paid approximately $722.45 million for a 30%, controlling stake in the company. Doosan Infracore will become a subsidiary of the newly created Hyundai Genuine group.

== See also ==
- Clark Equipment Company Administrative Complex

== Bibliography ==
- Farquhar-Boyle, Allyson S. "Company History: Clark Equipment Company". Answers.com.
- Rodriguez, Ginger G. "Hoover's Profile: Ingersoll-Rand Company Limited". Answers.com.
