= Frank Rounds =

American builder (1861–1945)

Frank Russel Rounds
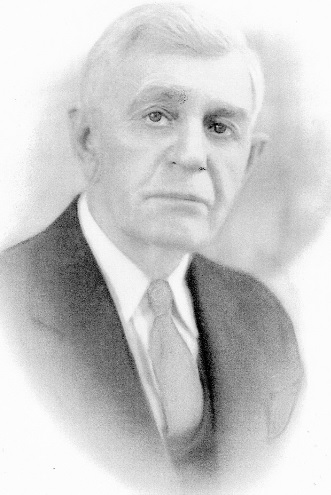
- Born: July 9, 1861; Jefferson County, New York, U.S.
- Died: September 9, 1945 (aged 84); Mackinac Island, Michigan, U.S.
- Resting place: Protestant Cemetery, Mackinac Island, Michigan
- Occupation: Carpenter
- Known for: The Round Island Lighthouse, Mackinac Island carpenter
- Spouse(s): Rose (Rumlow) Rounds; Lottie Agatha (Joli) Rounds
- Children: 9

Frank Russel Rounds (1861-1945) was an American carpenter, He lived on Mackinac Island and became known for building the Round Island Lighthouse - one of the most photographed lighthouses in the world. He built many Mackinac buildings, including the Little Stone Church, the boardwalk and the Wawashkamo golf club.

== Career ==
Rounds first came to the Island in 1887 as a worker for the Grand Hotel.

Rounds was a multifaceted craftsman. He contracted in October 1898 with Lewis L. McArthur to lead the landscape construction of the Wawashkamo golf course. The golf links opened in 1899 as built by Rounds and his crew, and became the oldest course in Michigan on which golf is played on the original grounds. (Other Michigan golf clubs are older, but moved or re-landscaped their grounds.) Historic Wawashkamo hazards such as the "chocolate drops" on the 8th and 17th hole were raised by Rounds and his men with fieldstones uncovered during the landscaping.

During the first decade of the twentieth century, Rounds' expertise with fieldstones and durable mortar led to enduring additions to Mackinac Island architecture. The Cudahys hired him at Stonecliffe, where Rounds and his crew built the safety wall at Sunset Rock, the bluff-top overlook recently acquired by the State Park. The historic fieldstone gateposts at Stonecliffe and Grand Hotel are almost certainly his works.

Two of Rounds's Grand Hotel gateposts still survive on the west side of the hotel facing West Bluff Road.

Rounds was a participant in the Golden Age of Mackinac Island summer travel. The period of active building on Mackinac Island was winding down in the 1920s and 1930s, Rounds continued to operate his carpentry shop off Astor Street, helping to repair and maintain the buildings he and his neighbors had built.

The Rounds family maintains artifacts and scale models of Mackinac Island buildings at the Robert Stuart House City Museum.

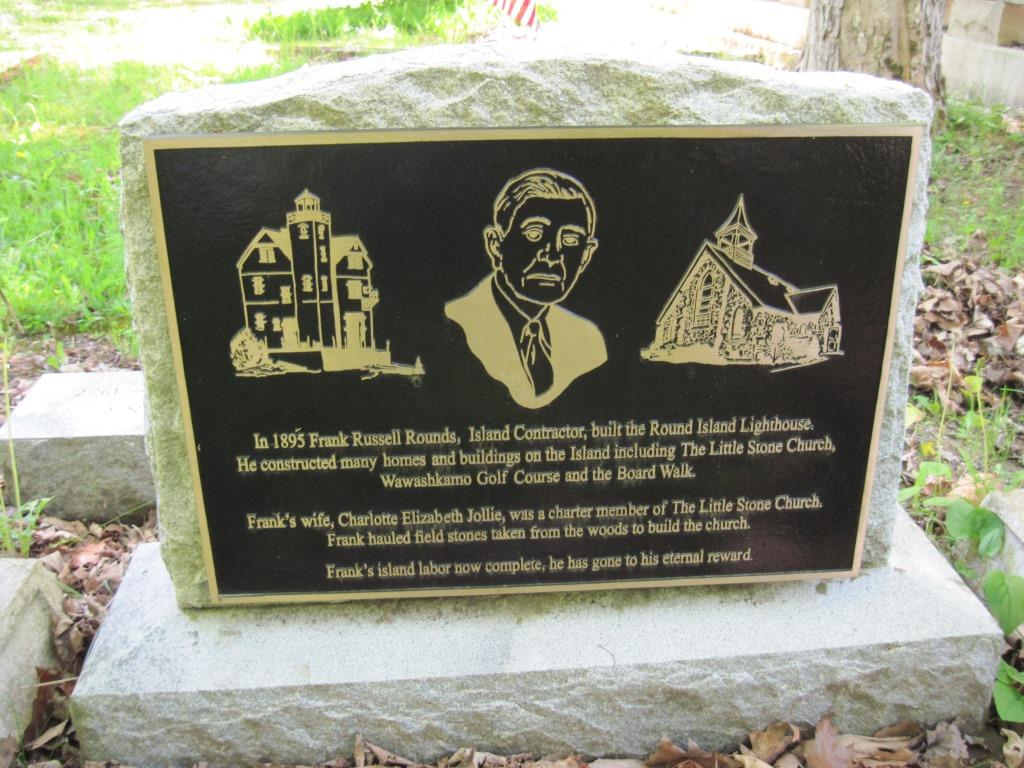

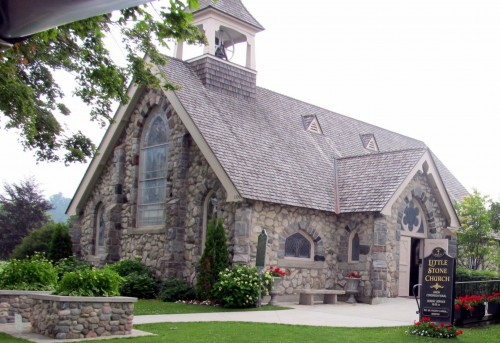

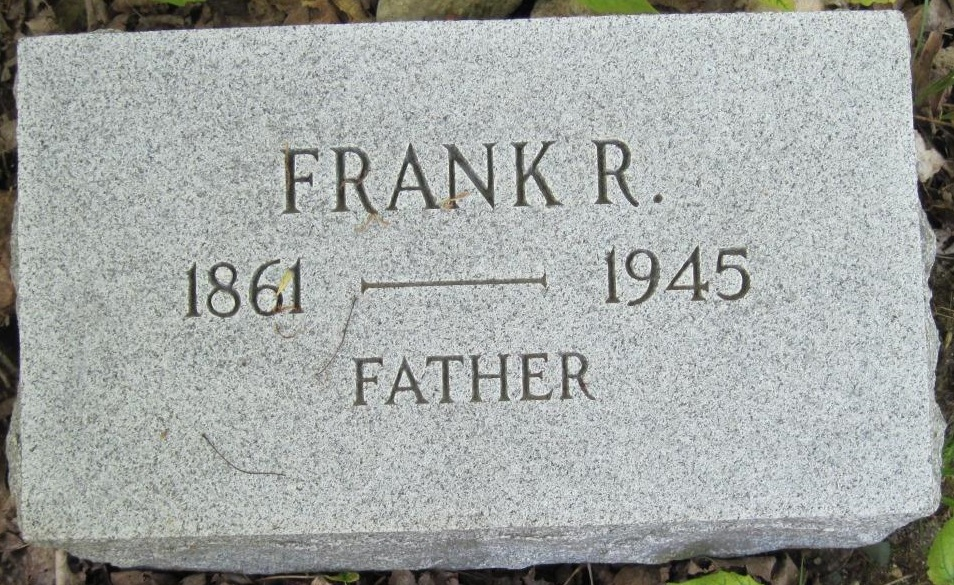

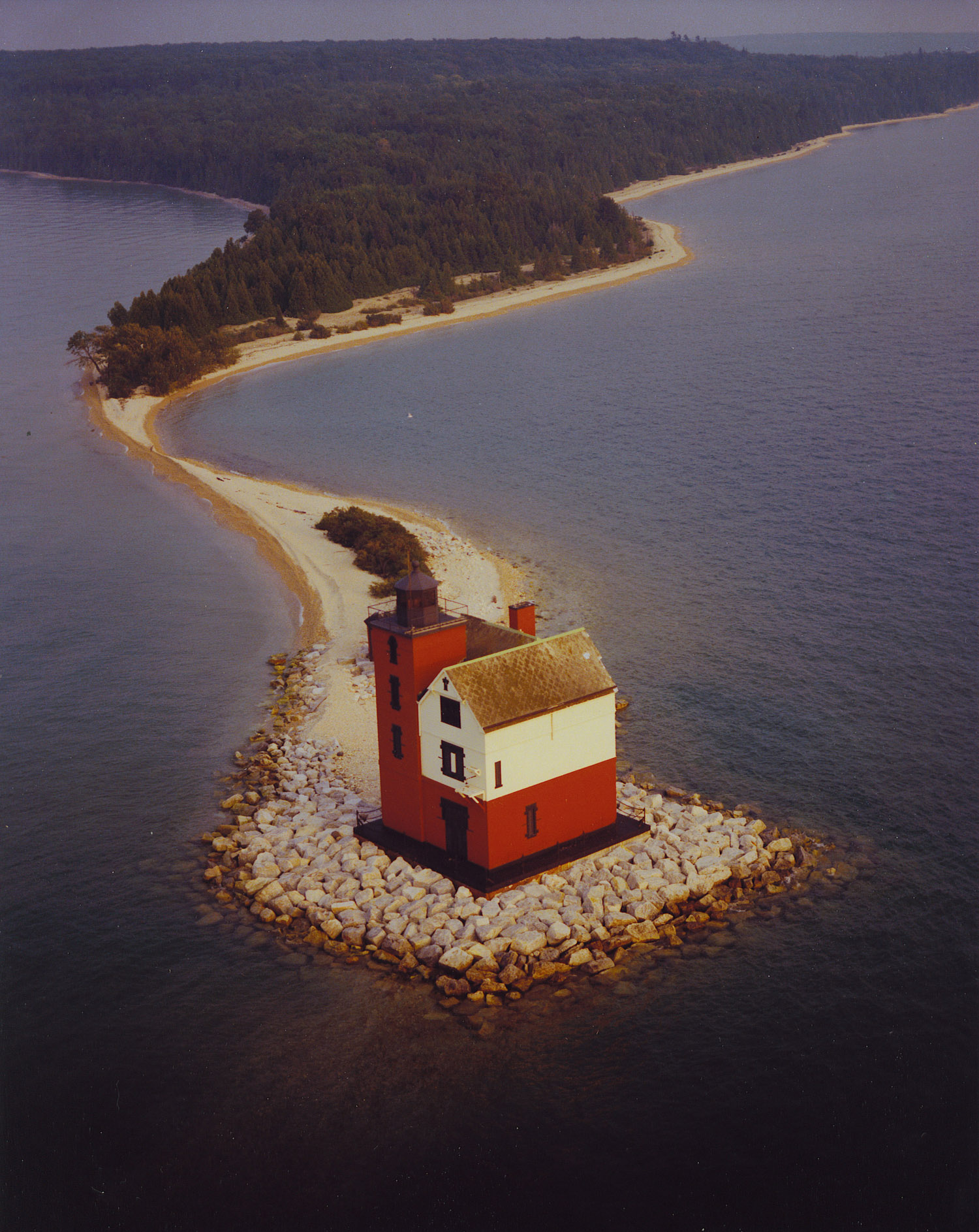
