= Clark Equipment Company Administrative Complex =

- U.S. National Register of Historic Places
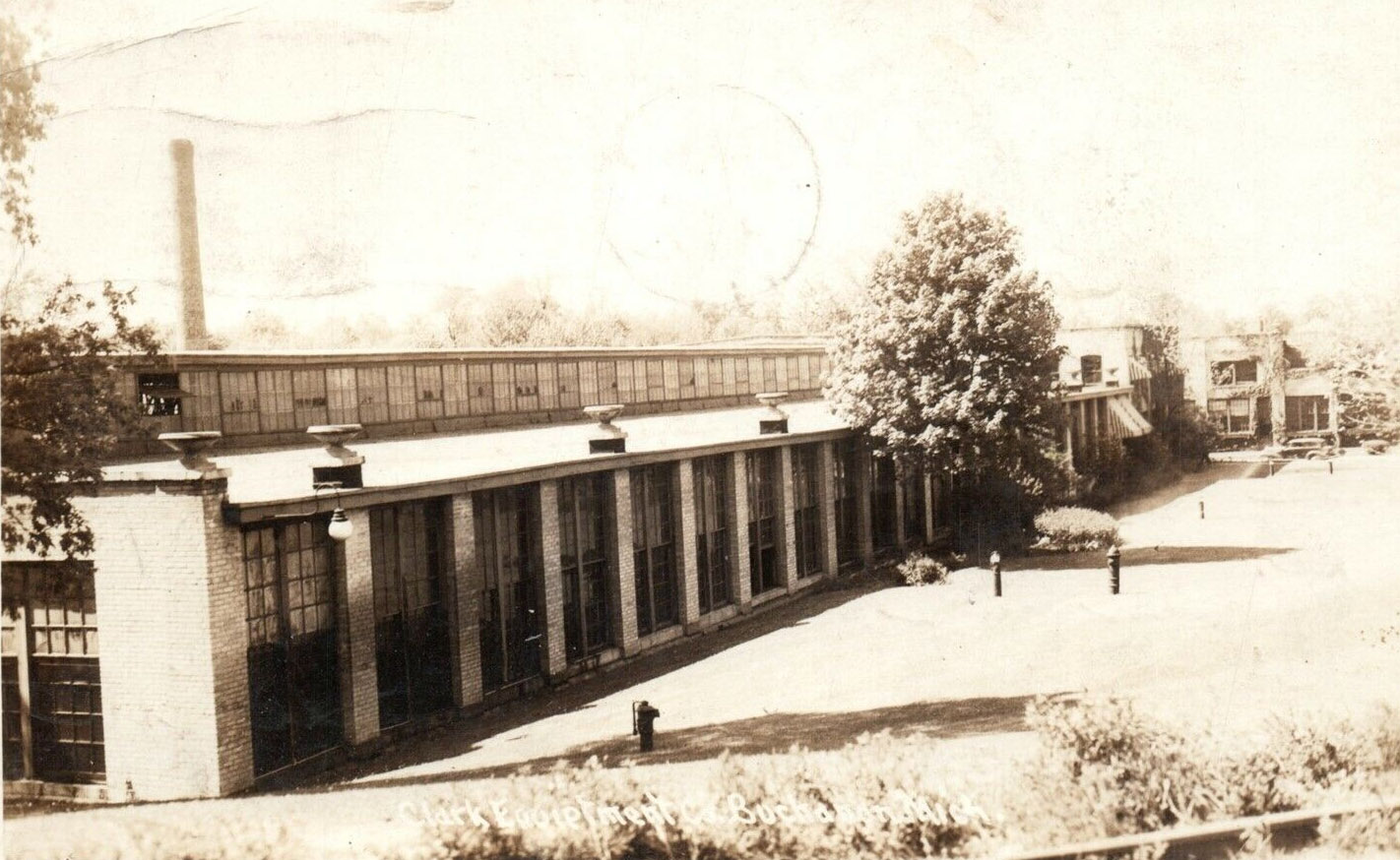
- Building 2, c. 1940
- Interactive map
- Location: 301-324 East Dewey St. and 204-302 North Red Bud Trail; Buchanan, Michigan
- Coordinates: 41°49′41″N 86°21′26″W
- Built: 1913
- Architectural style: Renaissance Revival, Art Moderne
- NRHP reference No.: 100008725
- Added to NRHP: March 13, 2023

The Clark Equipment Company Administrative Complex is a collection of former manufacturing buildings located at 301-324 East Dewey Street and 204-302 North Red Bud Trail in Buchanan, Michigan. It was the original home of Clark Equipment Company, and was listed on the National Register of Historic Places in 2023.

== History ==
The George R. Rich Manufacturing Company was founded in Chicago in 1902 to manufacture boring bars. It moved to Buchanan in 1904 and buildings were constructed on this site. The company initially struggled with a steel quality issue, but hired metallurgist Eugene Bradley Clark to solve the issue. By 1907 the company was growing, and had been reorganized as the Celfor Tool Company. By about 1913 construction began on Building No. 2, the oldest building still remaining in 2024. In 1916, Celfor merged with a related company to become Clark Equipment Company, named for Eugene Clark. About the same time, the company turned to making truck equipment. The campus expanded during World War I, and again during World War II as demand rose for military supplies.

After the war, the company's production shifted to axle and transmission manufacturing for automobiles. By the 1960, Clark had a global reach, and the last building constructed in the complex was built in 1966. During the recession of the 1980s, the company moved manufacturing jobs to South Carolina, and by the early, Clark closed the administrative headquarters in Buchanan.

== Description ==
The Clark Equipment Company Administrative Complex consisted of six buildings along with the associated parking lots and a manicured park that was an original part of the complex design. The oldest building (Building No. 2) was constructed by 1916 and served as the main corporate offices with additional manufacturing space. Building number 2 was constructed in a loosely interpreted Renaissance Revival style, and the remaining buildings take their cue from its design. Three smaller buildings, used for utilities and a guard house, were constructed nearby between about 1920 and 1940). A larger, more modern building (Building No. 42) was constructed in about 1944. The last building, used as an employment office, was built in 1966.
