= Berrien Springs Courthouse =

Historic building in Michigan, U.S.

- U.S. National Register of Historic Places
- U.S. Historic district – Contributing property
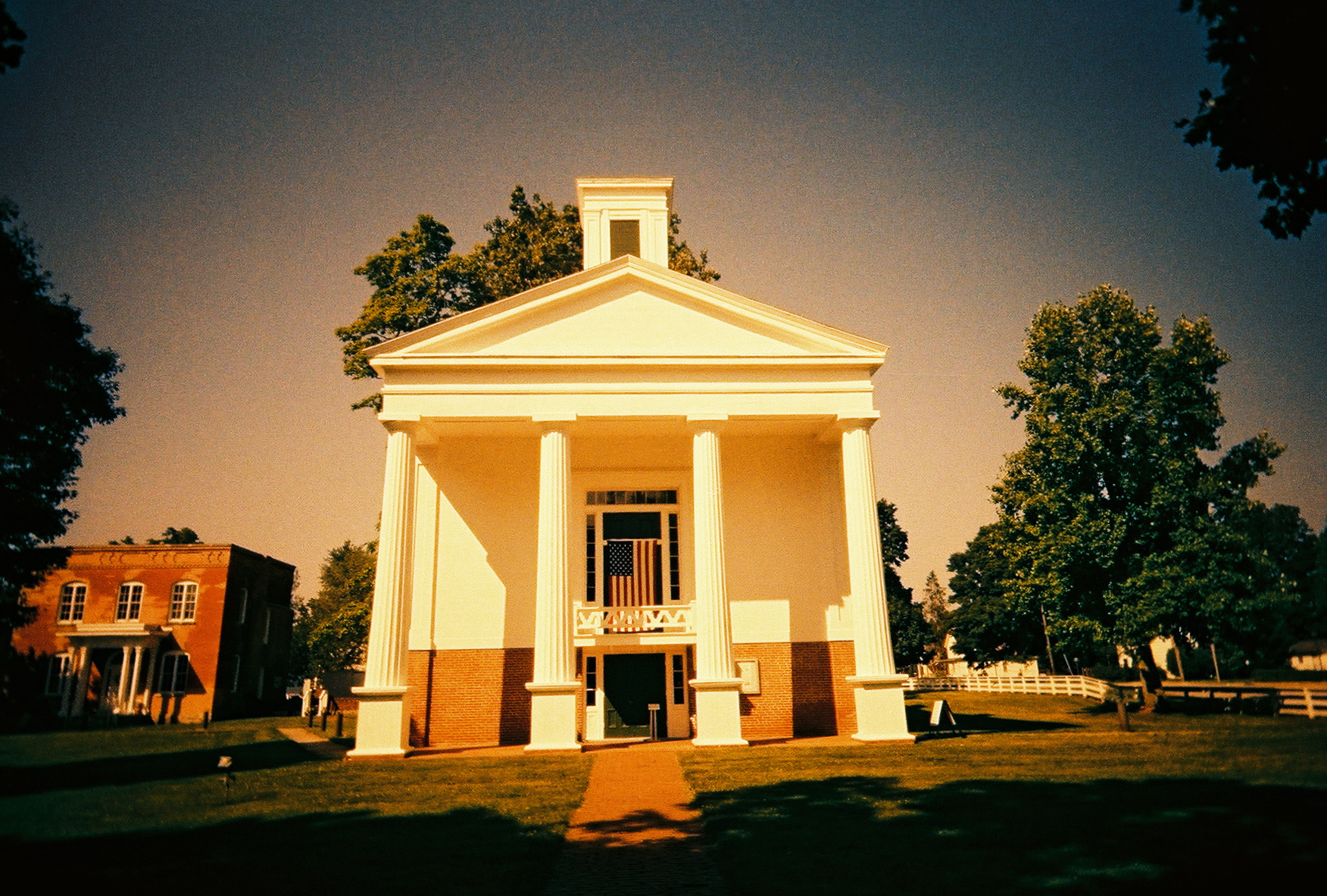

- Location within Michigan Location within the United States
- Interactive map
- Location: Corner of Union and Cass Sts., Berrien Springs, Michigan
- Coordinates: 41°56′53″N 86°20′28″W
- Area: less than one acre
- Built: 1838
- Built by: James Lewis
- Architect: Gilbert Button Avery
- Architectural style: Greek Revival
- Part of: Old Berrien County Courthouse Complex (ID82004941)
- NRHP reference No.: 70000265
- Added to NRHP: February 16, 1970

The Berrien Springs Courthouse (1839 County Courthouse) is a former government building located at the corner of Union and Cass Streets in Berrien Springs, Michigan. It was listed on the National Register of Historic Places in 1970. It is the oldest courthouse in Michigan and today is part of the History Center at Courthouse Square and is operated by the Berrien County Historical Association.

== History ==
Berrien County was first organized in 1831 after initially being part of Cass County. The location of the county seat was in flux for the first few years, with court and county business being held in Niles and St. Joseph. After some discussion, it was decided in 1837 to move to the more geographically central Berrien Springs. Among the first order of business, the county commissioners established the need for a courthouse and a jail. While they chose to build a two-story wooden jail first, the commissioners sought bids for the courthouse. Local architect Gilbert B. Avery, won the bid with his Greek Revival design and builder James Lewis was awarded a contract to erect the building for $2,500; construction was completed in by early April 1839 and Circuit Court Judge Epaphroditus Ransom convene the building's first session on April 11. In 1963, it was discovered the building's foundation was facing serious rot issues and the county approved the repairs. However, instead of merely replacing the wood of the existing foundation, the building was raised three feet and all wood was replaced with brick. Because the Courthouse's height was raised just enough, the county agreed, the former wooden steps leading to the second story of the building were unsafe. Instead an internal stairwell was installed. The front columns were given new bases, which can still be seen today. The height was certainly appreciated by workers on the first floor, who handled the law library, records office, and additional office space for court personnel.

After the county seat was moved from Berrien Springs to St. Joseph in 1894, the Courthouse and the remaining Courthouse Square buildings remained under the ownership of the County for the next few years. Residents of Berrien Springs and the surrounding areas continued to use the Courthouse as a de facto community center, hosting a dance hall, community events, lectures, and relocated the armory for the Berrien Springs Light Guard to the location. Briefly, the Courthouse, along with the other county buildings, served as the campus of Andrews University, then known as Emmanuel Missionary College, for their first school year in Berrien Springs (1901-1902).

While attempts to purchase the building and use for various purposes, the County retained ownership even as they sold off the rest of the Courthouse Square's. In 1916, the Seventh-day Adventists approached the county to rent the Courthouse to serve as their new village church. The county agreed and by 1917, regular worship was underway. After much discussion among church leaders, the SDA community opted to purchased the building outright and the sale was completed in 1922. The Courthouse would remain the Village SDA church until 1966, when the congregation moved to a new, much larger building down the road.

In 1967, the Berrien County Historical Commission (later Association) partnered with Berrien County to purchase the Courthouse and the BCHC worked to raise the funds to oversee the renovation. Restoration of the building and the installation of the permanent exhibits in the lower level were completed by 1976. While restoration was ongoing, programming and tours were still hosted by the museum in an attempt to raise awareness of the project. In 1989, the building was struck by lightning and caught fire. While the southeast corner was damaged, the remaining structure was untouched. The BCHA took this opportunity to do additional renovations inside the courtroom and made minor changes still seen today.

Today, the building remains open to the public as a museum and in 2021, the renovation of the permanent exhibits of the Courthouse were completed. The Courthouse continues to host the BCHA's events and programs while serving as a unique wedding venue.

== Honors and recognition ==
The 1839 Courthouse is added to the National Register of Historic Places in 1970.

In 1974 it was recognized by the State of Michigan as the oldest county courthouse in the state.

In 1982 it was relisted on the National Register of Historic Places as part of the Berrien County Court Complex.

In 2013 it was listed as the 37th Legal Milestone by the Michigan Bar Association.

== Description ==
The 1839 County Courthouse is a frame Greek Revival building, measuring 41 feet long and over 60 feet high (including the basement/lower level). The foundation was originally wood, but replaced with brick in 1863 and the brick was covered with a layer of concrete. The exterior walls are clad with wooden lapped siding with wide cornice tops and pilasters at each corner, while the interior walls are plaster over wood framing traditional to the time period. The building is topped by a gabled roof that is home to the building's square cupola, which houses a working bell.

The portico runs the width of the building and is framed with four Doric columns that extend to the roof. After the building was raised in 1863, square bases were added to each column to match the new height of the building. These were building in brick and are covered with wood. The original door to the courtroom foyer was originally accessed via wooden staircase prior to 1863 but was replaced with a small balcony after it was deemed too hazardous to replace the staircase at the new height.

Instead, an internal staircase was built and still used to access the second story today. The floor on the first floor is mostly concrete, with sections covered with carpet or tile, but the entry way is made of poplar wood planks, which are also used throughout the courtroom and its entryway. The flooring in the old jury room (now the Green Room) is made of narrow oak panels more common to the mid-20th century. The courtroom derives most of its light from the ten 15 foot windows on the east, west, and south walls. An additional ten windows are located on the lower level, but only three remain uncovered. These windows were replaced in 2019. The courthouse does have an interior balcony that remains closed off to the public for safety reasons.
