= Pillar Church =

- Holland Reformed Protestant Dutch Church
- U.S. National Register of Historic Places
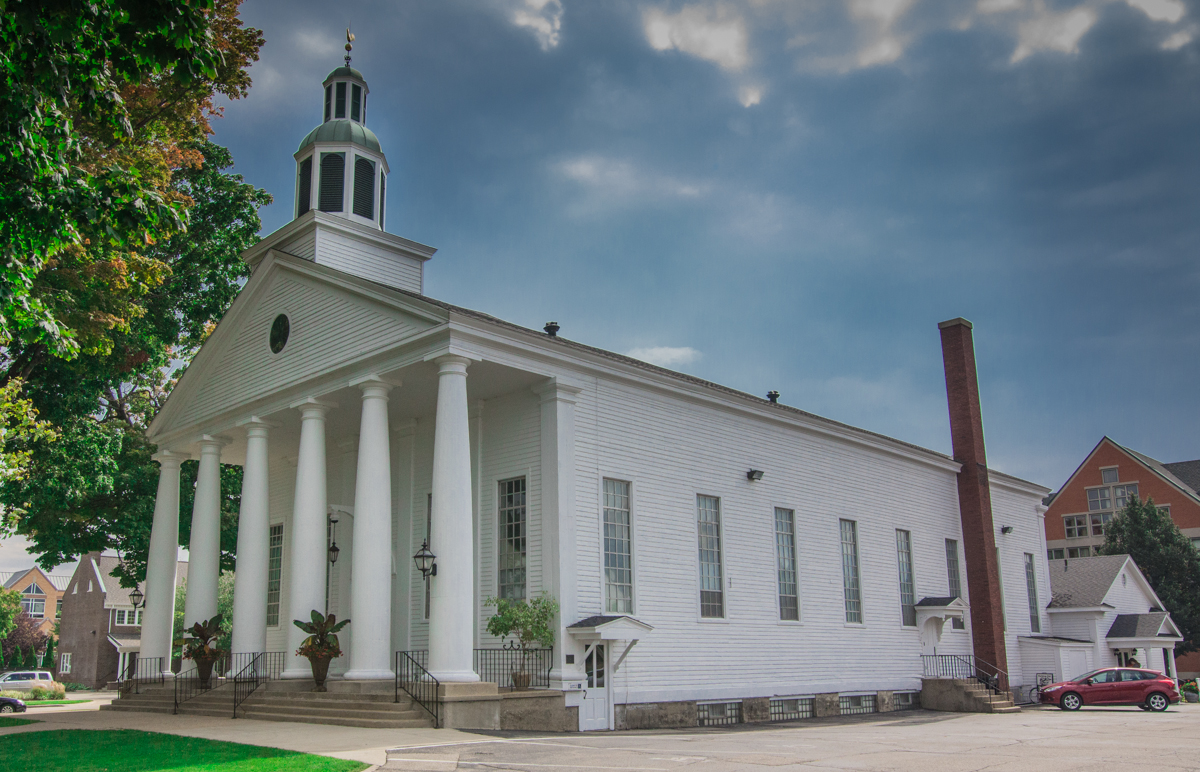

- Location within Michigan Location within the United States
- Interactive map
- Location: 57 E. 10th St., Holland, Michigan
- Coordinates: 42°47′19″N 86°6′17″W
- Area: 1 acre (0.40 ha)
- Built: 1847
- Built by: Jacobus Schrader
- Architectural style: Greek Revival
- NRHP reference No.: 90001243
- Added to NRHP: August 23, 1990

The Holland Reformed Protestant Dutch Church, now known as the Pillar Church, is a religious structure located at 57 East 10th Street in Holland, Michigan. It was listed on the National Register of Historic Places in 1990.

== History ==
Holland was first settled by Dutch immigrants, led by Rev. Albertus Christiaan Van Raalte, in 1847. That summer, the immigrants built their first church, a log structure. By 1854, the growth of the settlement necessitated the construction of a new church, and work on this building began. Construction was supervised by Jacobus Schrader, a millwright.

Substantial renovations were made to the church over the years. A pipe organ was installed in 1890. An annex, originally constructed to house the church library and classrooms, was added in 1900. A heating system and partial basement were put in place later. In 1947, a full basement was installed, and the church interior was entirely remodeled. The annex and the basement were remodeled in 1988.

The congregation has remained in this church through the present day. Early schisms split the church, particularly in 1884, after Van Raalte's death, when the majority of congregants voted to change denominations. However, in 2012, Pillar Church voted to become a dual-affiliation congregation, thus restoring what was split in 1884.

== Description ==
The Pillar Church is an elegant white clapboard Greek Revival structure with a low pitched roof. The front facade has temple front, with a portico containing six massive Doric columns topped by a classical entablature. A three-part tower, 60 feet in height, with an octagonal belfry, projects from the roof. A clapboard annex, constructed in 1900, projects from the rear of the building.

The current interior has a floor plan with a rectangular sanctuary with a center aisle, two side aisles and plain wooden pews. Additional seating is contained in a balcony above.
