= Robert Stuart House =

Historic house in Michigan, United States

- U.S. National Register of Historic Places
- Michigan State Historic Site
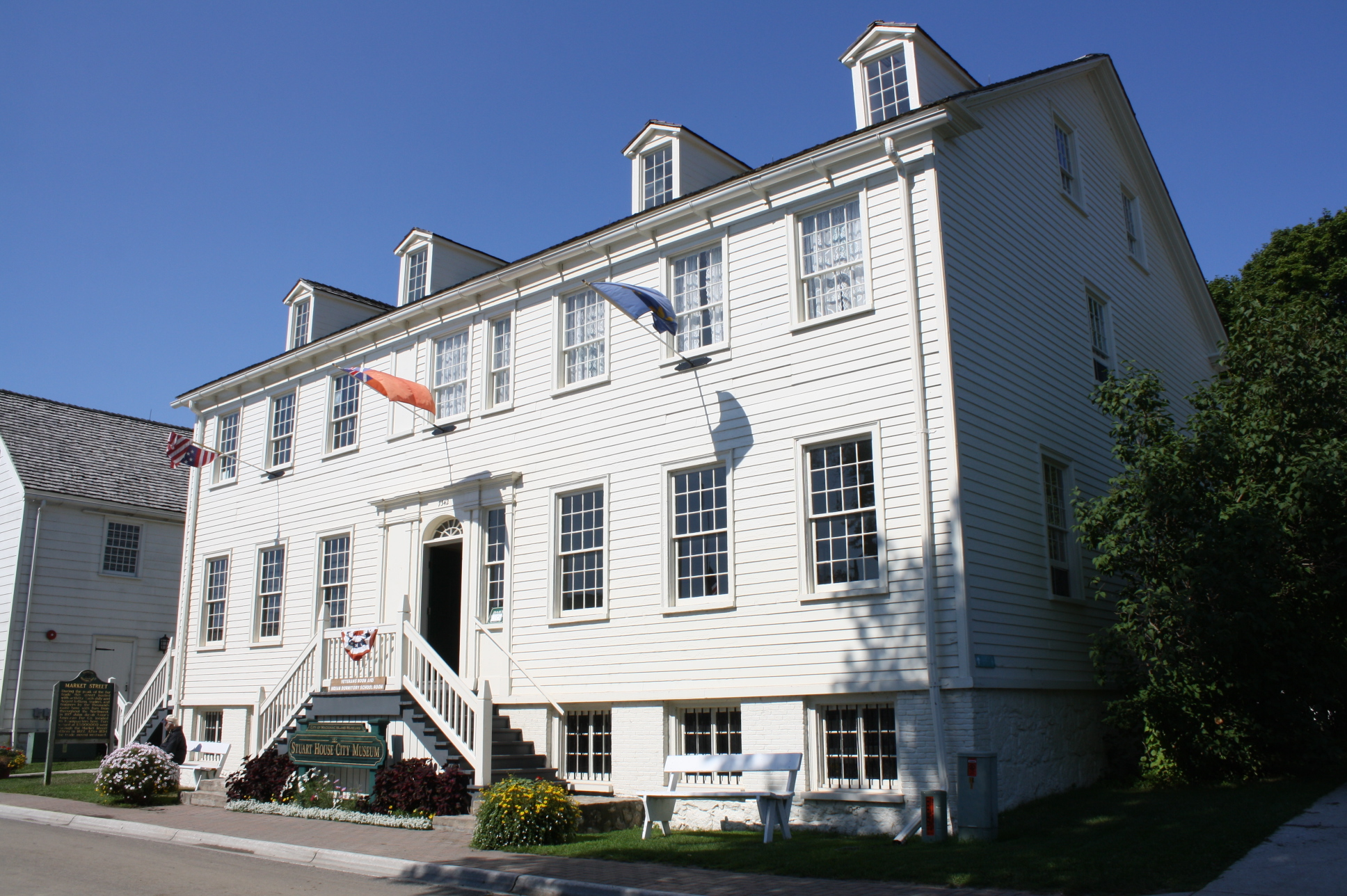

- Location within Michigan Location within the United States
- Interactive map
- Location: Market St., Mackinac Island, Michigan
- Coordinates: 45°50′59″N 84°37′7″W
- Area: 1 acre (0.40 ha)
- Built: 1817
- Architectural style: Federal style
- NRHP reference No.: 71000411

Significant dates
- Added to NRHP: April 16, 1971
- Designated MSHS: March 23, 1965

The Robert Stuart House, also known as the Agent's House or Agency House, is a building located at 34 Market Street on Mackinac Island, Michigan. It was listed on the National Register of Historic Places in 1971 and designated a Michigan State Historic Site in 1965.

== History ==
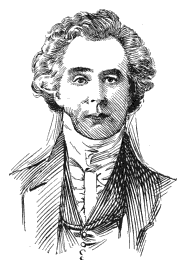
Robert Stuart

The Robert Stuart House was built in 1817 as the "Agent's House," housing the resident agent of the American Fur Company, which was at that time Ramsay Crooks. In addition the building housed other agents and clerks. The Agency House was part of a four-building complex constructed to house the American Fur Company's offices. The other three buildings were a clerk's quarters (now demolished), a warehouse built in 1810 (now the Community Hall), and a trading post (subsequently altered, but later restored).

Also in 1817, Robert Stuart arrived on the island as Crooks's assistant. Upon his arrival, Stuart was housed as a guest in the Agent's House. In 1820, Crooks moved on and Stuart was appointed to succeed him as resident agent, a position he held for the next 14 years. Because of Stuart's national prominence and his lengthy association with the Agent's House, the building is nominally referred to as the Robert Stuart House.

The 1820s and 1830s were boom years for the American Fur Company's operation on Mackinac Island; in 1822 more than three million dollars of furs were cleared through the Mackinac Island operation. Given his prominence, it was natural that Robert Stuart's house served as the social center of the island during this time. However, the fur trade began to decline in the 1830s, and in 1835 Stuart moved on to Detroit.

As the fur trade declined, Mackinac Island became a resort community. The Robert Stuart House was used as a boardinghouse in the years before and during the Civil War. In 1871, the entire American Fur Company complex was purchased by James F. Cable and the three main buildings - the Agent's House, warehouse, and clerk's quarters - were linked with palisades and turned into the premiere island hotel of the time, the John Jacob Astor House. It remained the social center of the island until the construction of the Grand Hotel.

== Stuart House City Museum ==
In 1900, the complex was sold to the city of Mackinac Island. It was operated as a hotel until 1929. In 1941 the building were separated back into individual units. The Robert Stuart House was used as a museum, and is now known as the Stuart House City Museum.

The bulk of the items in the museum were created by Dale Verne Gensman (Rounds) and are on semi-permanent loan to the museum. Dale was the son of Frank Rounds, builder of the Round Island lighthouse and Mackinac Island carpenter. The items donated by Dale are maintained by his Children and Grandchildren.

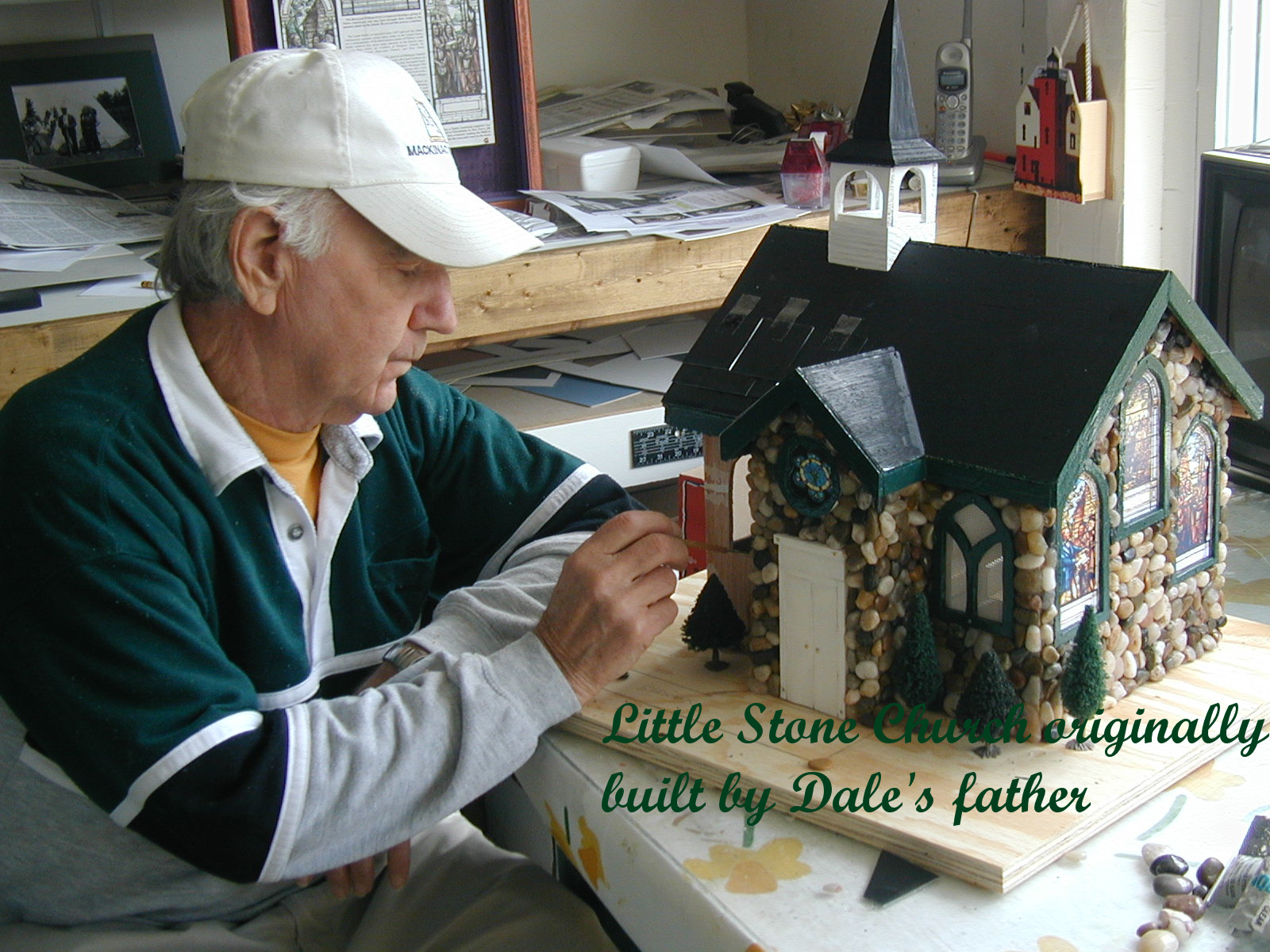
Dale Gensman, Stuart House Museum

== Description ==
The Robert Stuart House is a two-story, Federal style structure with side gables sitting on a brick foundation. It is built with hand-hewn timber frame and clad with clapboards. The roof is shingled and features gabled dormers.

The front facade has a two-sided stairway leading to a small entry porch. The entrance door is flanked by sidelights and pilasters. The multiple windows have small panes.
