= Greenmead Farms =

Historic house in Michigan, United States

- Greenmead Historical Park
- U.S. National Register of Historic Places
- Michigan State Historic Site
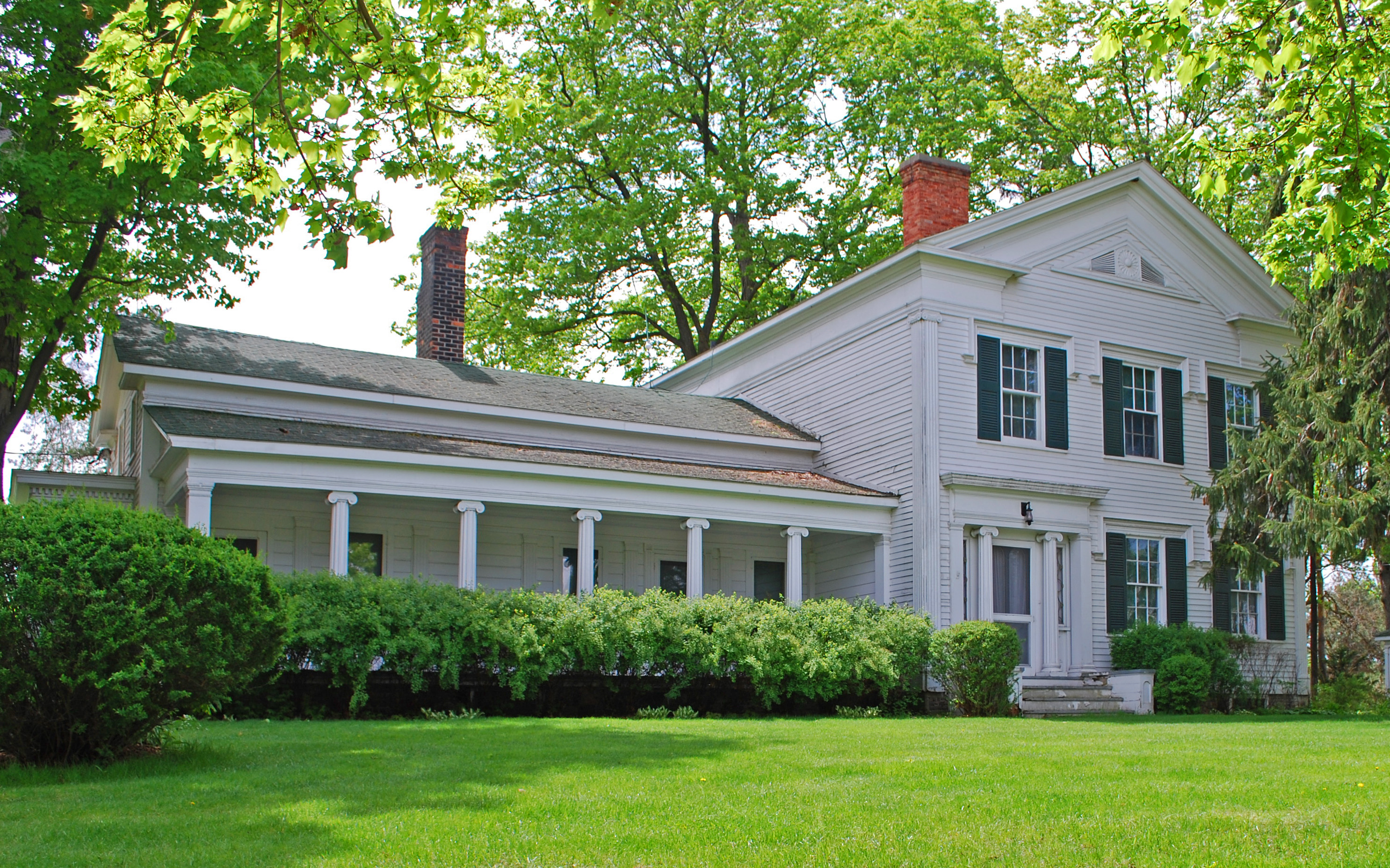
- Joshua Simmons House
- Interactive map
- Location: 38125 Base Line Road, Livonia, Michigan
- Coordinates: 42°26′17″N 83°25′5″W
- Built: 1841
- Built by: Sergium Lyon
- Architectural style: Greek Revival
- NRHP reference No.: 72000672

Significant dates
- Added to NRHP: March 24, 1972
- Designated MSHS: August 13, 1971

Greenmead Historical Park, also known as Greenmead Farms, is a 3.2-acre (1.3 ha) historic park located at 38125 Base Line Rd., Livonia, Michigan. It includes the 1841 Greek Revival Simmons House, six other structures contributing to the historic nature of the property, and additional buildings moved from other locations. Greenmead Farms was designated a Michigan State Historic Site in 1971 and listed on the National Register of Historic Places in 1972.

== History ==
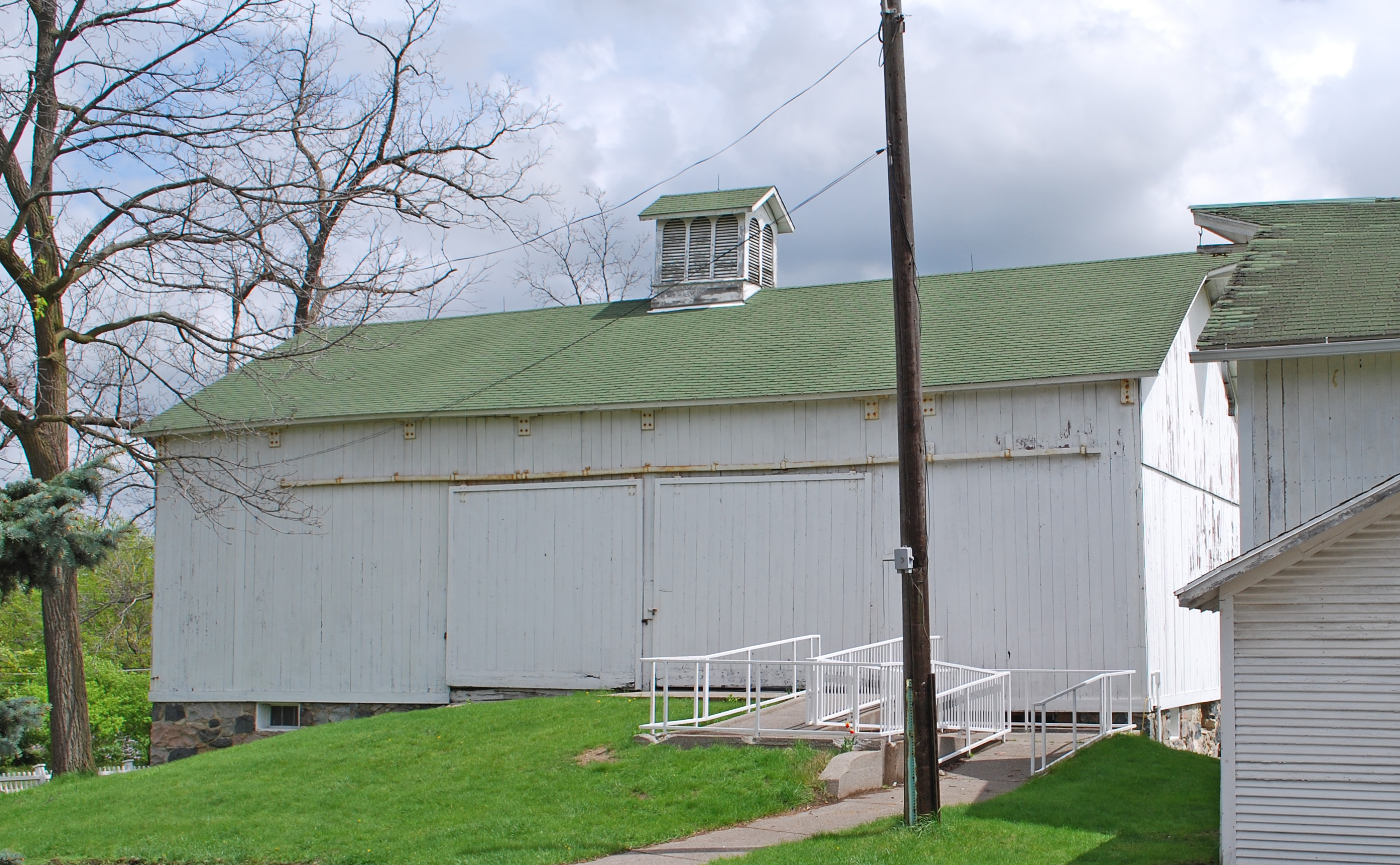
North barn, built by Joshua Simmons (1829) and the first barn constructed in Livonia

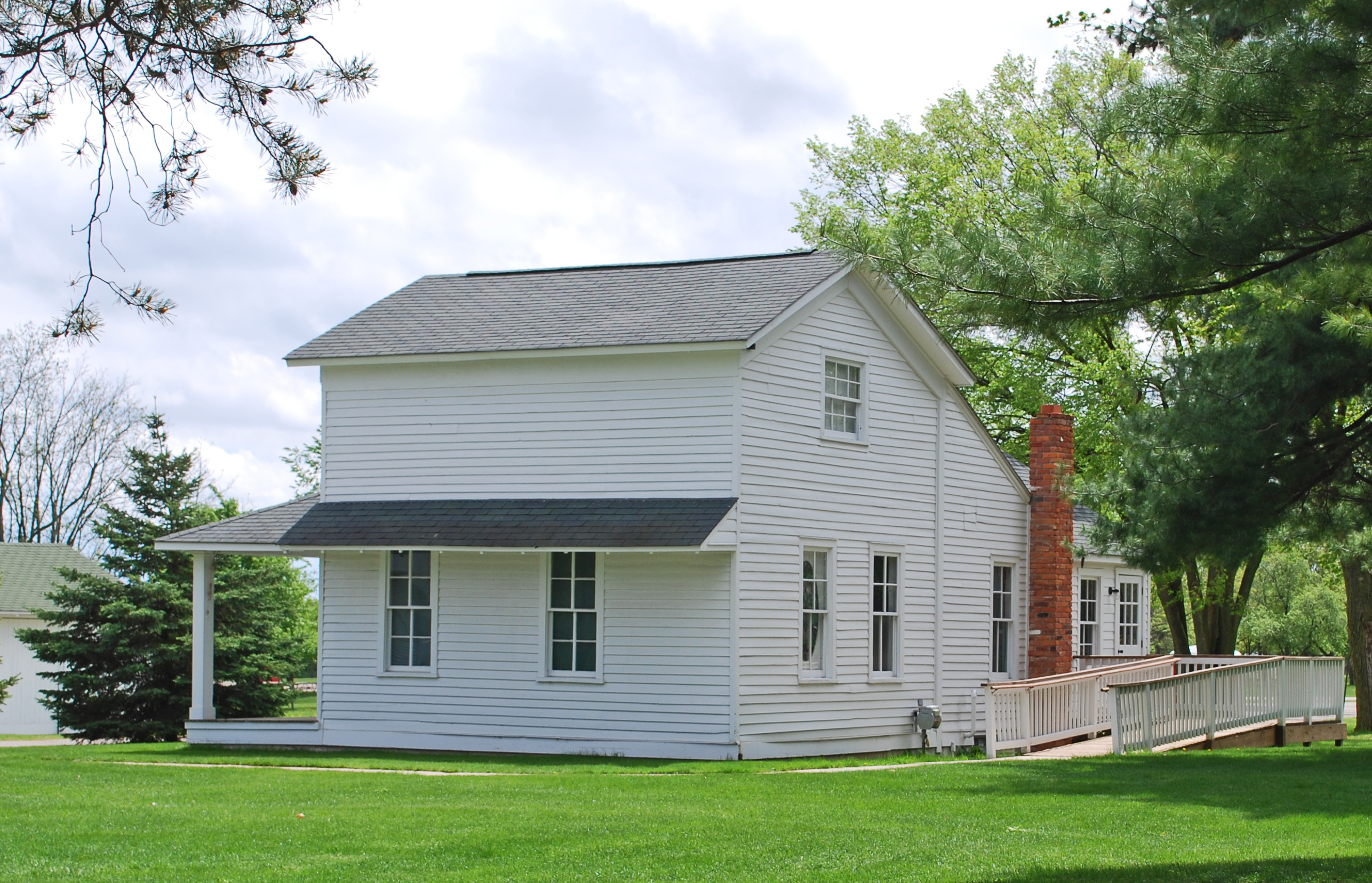
Farmhand's House, possibly the original Simmons cabin, c. 1826

In 1825, twenty-three-year-old Joshua Simmons, along with his wife Hannah, moved from Bristol, New York to a 160-acre (0.65 km^{2}) parcel of land in what is now Livonia. Simmons named his farm "Meadow Brook," and built a small log cabin on the property in 1826. In 1841, he hired Sergium Lyon to build the Greek Revival farmhouse that still stands on the property. Simmons continued to farm, adding buildings as needed and acquiring additional property to become the wealthiest landholder in Livonia by the time of his death in 1882.

The Simmons family stayed on the farm until 1915. In 1920, the farm was purchased by Sherwin and Jean Boyd Hill, who renamed it "Greenmead." Hill raised dairy cattle at the farm until his death in 1961. The farm was placed on the National Register of Historic Places in 1972, and the city of Livonia purchased in 1976 for use as a park, and moved other historic structures, including a number of pre-Civil War houses, onto the grounds. As of 2025, the property is open to the public.

== Description of the original farm complex ==
The 1841 farmhouse is a two-story, Greek Revival frame house with side gables and clapboard siding, sitting on a stone foundation. Drip molding surmounts the windows, and Ionic pilasters flank the front door. The interior has five fireplaces, and period 19th-century woodwork.

In addition to the house, nine of the original eleven outbuildings are still standing. These include the 1829 North Barn (the first barn built in Livonia), the farmhand's house (believed to be the original Simmons cabin), an additional barn and a greenhouse.

== Other structures moved to Greenmead ==
Four additional structures built in the mid-19th century, collectively known as "the village," are located on the Greenmead grounds:

Name	Image	Date built	Description
Cranson-Hinbern House		1850s	This house is currently used as a gift shop and staff offices. The house was originally located on Inkster Road south of Seven Mile. The original rear portion of the house was built in the 1830s by Persis Cranson, and the larger front portion was added in the 1850s. Reke Hinbern purchased the house in 1902 and it remained in the family until 1984, when it was sold and donated to the city. The house was restored to its c. 1900 appearance by removing the results of several 20th-century remodeling efforts.
Kingsley House		1843	A classic Greek Revival farmhouse with period furnishings. The house was originally built by Nathan Kingsley on Farmington Road, just north of Five Mile, shortly after his marriage. The house stayed in the Kingsley family until 1914. In 1977, it was donated to the city and moved to where it now stands.
Thomas Shaw House		1843	Another Greek Revival farmhouse, but constructed in a grander style for a more affluent family. The Shaw House originally stood on Six Mile Road; it was moved in 1973 to make room for I-275.
The Friends' Meeting House		1846	This structure was originally a meeting hall for the Society of Friends. The Society disbanded in 1860, and the hall was converted to a private house.

The eastern part of the park features seven more historic buildings, restored to the appearance they had in the 1915-1920 timeframe. This cluster of buildings mimics the actual intersection of Ann Arbor Trail and Newburgh Roads in Livonia. The seven buildings are:

Name	Image	Date built	Description
Detroit United Railway Waiting Room		1897	This structure was built for an interurban line that ran between Wayne, Plymouth, Northville, and Livonia. This line ran through the area until 1927; the building was moved to Greenmead in 1976.
The Bungalow		1913	A small two-bedroom clapboard home with period furnishings from the early 20th century.
Newburg Methodist Church		1848	A church with curved pews and original stained glass windows. The church was originally built as a Presbyterian Meeting House on Ann Arbor Trail near the Newburg Cemetery. In 1915, it was moved to the corner of Ann Arbor Trail and Newburg Road, and in 1977 was moved to Greenmead.
The Parsonage		1924	The Parsonage of the Methodist Church, which is currently the private residence of the park's caretaker.
The Newburg School		1863	This structure is a one-room schoolhouse built at the corner of Ann Arbor Trail and Newburg Road for $400.00 and used until 1922, when it was replaced with a brick building. The brick replacement building was demolished in 1974, and this schoolhouse was moved to Greenmead in 1987.
A.J. Geer General Store		1908	The store was moved to Greenmead in 1976.
Alexander Blue House		mid-19th century	This structure was built by Judge Alexander Blue, who served as Justice of the Peace from 1846 to 1874. The Blue house, originally located on Middlebelt Road, had a number of decorative Italianate flourishes. The Blue family lived in the house until 1915, when it was sold to Fred and Frank Wolfram. The Wolfram family lived in the house until the 1980s, when it was donated to the city and moved to Greenmead. The house has been restored to its 1880s appearance.
