= Wing–Allore House =

Historic house in Michigan, United States

- U.S. National Register of Historic Places
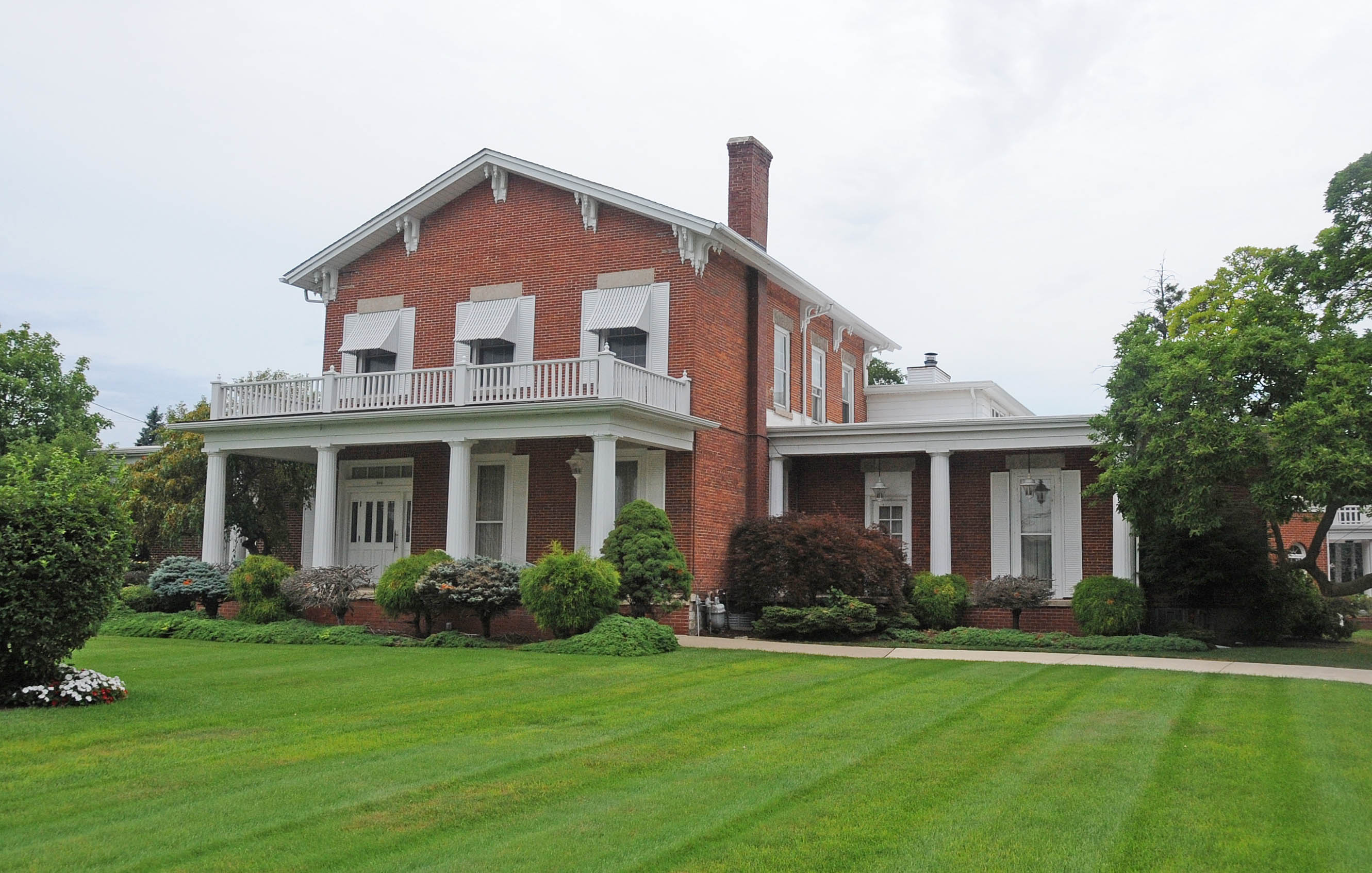

- Location within Michigan Location within the United States
- Interactive ma
- Location: 203 E. Elm Ave. Monroe, Michigan
- Coordinates: 41°55′3″N 83°23′35″W
- Built: c. 1829
- Architectural style: Italianate
- NRHP reference No.: 14001008
- Added to NRHP: December 10, 2014

The Wing–Allore House is a funeral home located at 203 E. Elm Avenue in Monroe. The house was built as a private home, converted to a funeral home in the 1930s, and remains in business as the Allore Chapel of the Martenson Family of Funeral Homes. It was added to the National Register of Historic Places in 2014.

== History ==
Austin Eli Wing was born in 1792 in Conway, Massachusetts, and graduated from Williams College in 1814. Lewis Cass and William Woodbridge convinced Wing to move to the Michigan Territory, where he joined Woodbridge's law firm. He was appointed sheriff of the territory, and served as a delegate from the Michigan Territory to the US House of Representatives from 1825 to 1829 and 1831–33. In 1828, Wing purchased the property on which this house now stands. It is uncertain when the house itself was constructed, but it could have been as early as 1829. Wing and his wife Harriet lived in the house until 1844, when they passed it on to their son, Talcott E. Wing. Austin Wing died in 1849.

Talcott E. Wing was born in 1819, and moved with his parents to Monroe in 1829. He graduated from Williams College in 1840, and in 1844, the same year he moved into this house, he was admitted to the bar in Michigan. He ran a law practice from 1849 until about 1857 with Ira R. Grosvenor, and in 1864 was elected probate judge. He was also elected president of the Michigan Historical Society in 1888 and 1889. Talcott Wing lived in this house until his death in 1890, and his estate sold in 1892.

Ellen J. Hall owned the house from 1892 to 1899, then sold it to nurseryman Theodore E. Ilgenfritz. Theodore was the son of Israel Ilgenfritz, a Monroe pioneer and nationally known nurseryman who had settled in Monroe in 1847. Theodore was born in 1856, attended Albion College, and married Kate La Fontaine in 1878. He joined his father's firm in 1884. The couple moved into this house in 1899, and lived there until Theodore's death in 1919 and Kate's in 1935.

In 1937, morticians Earle Little and Frank Weber leased the house from the Ilgenfritz estate, renovated the property, and at the beginning of 1938 opened a mortuary. Later that year, Frank Weber, Eli Allore, and Gus Beam formed a partnership and purchased the house, reopening as the Allore, Beam and Weber Mortuary. Eli Allore, the driving force behind the firm, was born in 1907, and in 1925 joined Frank Weber's firm of Nadeau and Weber Undertaking. He was elected county coroner in 1932, then in 1933 partnered with Gus Beam. Allore, Beam and Weber Mortuary continued until the early 1940s; Beam left the firm in 1943 and Weber retired in 1945. Allore bought out the other partners, keeping the business in his name. Eli retired in 1973 after a stroke and sold the business to his son Robert Allore. Robert Allore operated the business and lived in the apartment above the funeral home with his wife until 1994, when he retired and sold the firm. The Martenson Family Funeral Homes of Trenton, Michigan purchased the house and business in 1994, retaining the Allore name.

== Description ==
The original part of the Wing–Allore House, dating from approximately 1829, is a two-story, red brick, gable-front Italianate structure. Smaller additions were built on the side and rear at some point during ht 19th century, and further additions, mostly complementary flat-roofed structures, were added after 1939 when the house was converted to a funeral parlor. The complete structure now encompasses 9190 square feet.
