= Old Berrien County Courthouse Complex =

- U.S. National Register of Historic Places
- Michigan State Historic Site
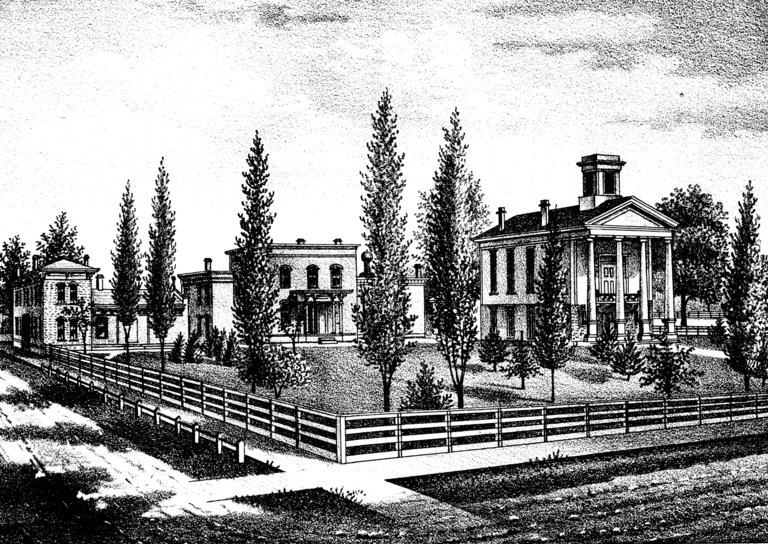
- Courthouse Complex c. 1880

- Location within Michigan Location within the United States
- Interactive map
- Location: 313 North Cass Street, Berrien Springs, Michigan 49103, Berrien Springs, Michigan
- Coordinates: 41°56′53″N 86°20′28″W
- Area: 1.5 acres (0.61 ha)
- Built: 1837
- Architectural style: Italianate, Greek Revival
- NRHP reference No.: 82004941
- Added to NRHP: April 29, 1982

The Berrien County Historic Courthouse Square, also known as the History Center at Courthouse Square, is the oldest town square in the Midwest and is a historic district located in Berrien Springs, Michigan. The complex is 1.6 acres and is home to five structures, two of which are the oldest of their kind in the state of Michigan, and include the 1839 Courthouse, Michigan's oldest Courthouse, and the 1829 Murdoch Cabin, Michigan's oldest two-story cabin. The property and its buildings are owned by Berrien County and stewarded by the Berrien County Historical Association. While the historic 1839 Courthouse was added to the United States' Department of the Interior National Register of Historic Places in 1970, the BCHA resubmitted the application to include the entire courthouse square during the 1970s. The application was approved and the entire complex was added to the national register in 1982.

== History ==
Berrien County was officially established in 1829, but was organized in 1831. County offices were hotly debated between Niles on one extreme of the county and St. Joseph on the other extreme of the county, before Berrien Springs was chosen in 1837 for its central location in the county making it easily accessible to all. That same year, the county accepted the donation of property along Union Street and commissioned the construction of the first permanent, county building - a two-story wooden jail in 1837 which was operational in 1838. After requesting bids in 1838, the county commissioners chose Gilbert B. Avery to construct the County Courthouse. Completed in 1839, it was operational in April 1839 and the building served as both a site of government and as a community center for Berrien Springs and Berrien County residents.

Over the next several decades, the county's growth impacted its operations, and the Commissioners were faced with the need for additional space. In 1860, the county once again turned to Gilbert Avery who designed the Records Building. Built by George Murdock, the one-story building was quickly outgrown and a two-story addition was added in 1973. The county records were housed here along with the Registrar and the Probate Judge offices. With this addition, the complex stretched from Union Street to Madison Street along North Cass Street, in Berrien Springs.

Two more building was constructed by the County on this town square site - the 1870 Sheriff's Office and the second County Jail. As before, Avery was hired to design the building, although he ended up overseeing the construction after issues with the builder. The buildings were completed at the end of 1869, with the sheriff and his family moving into the building in January 1870. Once the prisoners being held at the old jail were moved to the new one, that former jail was converted into an outbuilding. With a small road passing through the property, visitors to the complex had easy access to each building on foot or by buggy.

=== Fight for the County Seat ===
Despite Berrien Springs being located in the middle of the county and easily accessible to all county residents, property investors in St Joseph made a concerted effort to move the county seat to St Joseph to prosper their own city and pockets. By 1894, a vote was held to determine if the county seat should be moved or not. The weeks leading up to election day were contentious as Berrien Springs, St. Joseph, and Niles vied for the county seat, with newspapers being a spirited part of the process. After Benton Harbor threw its votes behind its sister city, St. Joseph won the election with less than 20 votes. The loss was a bitter one for Berrien Springs and The Berrien Springs Era didn't hold back as the county began its move, "The motive power used in the removal was mostly furnished by horses, but the direction of affairs was left to the jackasses, of which St. Joe has an abundance." For their part, St. Joseph were passive-aggressive in their victory, tipping their hats to their neighbors after a contentious battle.

In 1895, the county began construction on a new courthouse in St Joseph, but while some operations immediately moved to St. Joseph, some remained in Berrien Springs for at least another year. This included the Sheriff, whose new residence and jail were completed in the early fall of 1895. The second courthouse in St Joseph had to be demolished in the 1960's due to significant structural issues.

=== A New Era ===
Despite no longer needing the complex in Berrien Springs, the county was hesitant to sell at first. Residents of Berrien Springs continued to use the Courthouse for meetings, weddings, community events, and even established a dance hall and armory. In 1900, Battle Creek College, a Seventh-day Adventist school, made the decision to move to a new location, opting for Berrien Springs. While their new campus was being constructed, the college, which had renamed itself Emmanuel Missionary College (now Andrews University) approached the county, seeking to rent the old complex buildings. The county agreed and the 1901–1902 school year was held, with administrative offices in the Records building, classes in the Sheriff's Residence and Courthouse, and the courtroom itself serving as the college chapel which was open to the community. After the college moved to its new campus, the buildings were once again used by the community, Emmanuel Missionary College, and the ever growing Seventh-day Adventist community who initially moved to Berrien Springs to attend the college but permanently settled there upon completion of their schooling.

By the 1910s, the county split the complex apart and sold the Records Building and the Sheriff's Office which were converted into apartments. The jail was torn down in 1916 as it was no longer needed. This left the courthouse and town square remaining under county ownership. The Seventh-day Adventist community had grown considerably, and they approached the county to rent the Courthouse as a church after the departure of Emmanuel Missionary College (now Andrews University) to their new campus. The agreement would remain in place until 1922, when the church elders of the "Village Church" opted to purchase the building. After purchasing land to the west of the courthouse, the church built an auxiliary building to host meetings and to house the Village Seventh-day Adventist school. By the 1950s, a second building at the corner of North Cass Street and Madison Street was constructed, serving as a doctor's office.

=== Preservation and Additions ===
In 1965, the SDA Village Church realized their congregation had outgrown the Courthouse space and built a new church building less than a mile from the Courthouse. The church officially moved into the new building in 1966 and two of the three buildings it owned on the courthouse square continued as the Village Seventh-day Adventist School. The sheriff's Residence remained under private ownership, having been converted into apartments, while the Old Records' Building had been turned into a mixed-use residential and commercial building.

In 1968, the Berrien County Historical Commission and Berrien County combined their efforts to purchase the portion of the complex owned by the SDA church, with the goal of restoring the Courthouse. For the next eight years, the BCHC raised the funds needed to complete the restoration of the Courthouse and completed it in 1975. It is still an active Berrien County courthouse, and used for weddings, special ceremonies, and educational purposes as outlined in MCL - Section 600.1515 of the Michigan Revised Judicature Act of 1961 - Act 236. It specifically depicts an historic 1880's courtroom. Berrien County Clerk's office retains copies of historic court trial proceedings from 1839 to the present.

As the commission decided to rebrand in 1975, they also began to focus on securing the remaining two buildings - the Records Building and Sheriff's Residence. By the late 1970s, the Sheriff's Residence had been purchased, and the Records building was reunited with the Courthouse square in the 1990s, although the building wouldn't be available for restoration until 2000.

In 1968, the 1829 Murdoch Log Cabin was uncovered under modern siding during a demolition of a home on nearby Kephart Road, Berrien Springs. Extensive research by local historians, aided by Western Michigan University, established the cabin as the original 1829 home of Berrien Springs co-founder Francis Murdoch, who is regarded as one of the most important Human Rights attorneys in United States history for his prolific defense of those escaping slavery. In 1973, the BCHC agreed to have the building moved to the Courthouse property and it was placed just behind the courthouse. Two years later, the BCHC rebranded and became the Berrien County Historical Association to better reflect the growth of its mission and properties.

As the BCHC was looking towards other projects, the auxiliary building and doctor's office had been earmarked for demolition. However, in 1977, the family of local resident and history lover, George Bennett, approached the organization with a substantial donation in their father's name. It was decided that the best way to honor George Bennett was to turn the auxiliary building into an exhibit space. The auxiliary building was converted into "Bennett's Forge and Buggy Shop," depicting a fully functional 1800s blacksmith's forge, and was opened to the public in 1978. The doctor's office was torn down in the 1980s.

The Sheriff's Residence was finally available for renovation in the early 1980s and all phases were completed by 1985. The upper levels were set aside as workspace for staff, while the lower level included space for permanent and temporary exhibits depicting life in the 1880s. The addition on the back of the house was converted into vaults for the BCHA's growing collections. By 1995, the Jail Plaza, designed to mimic the floor and walls of the old jail, was completed.

Although the county and the BCHA had owned the Records Building since the 1990s, it wasn't until the 2000s before the last of the tenants vacated the property. Plans for the building had been around since the early 1990s, but was hampered by funding constraints. In 2007, the Records building caught fire, but was restored using insurance funds. After repairs to sure up the structure had been made, disheartened, both the County and the BCHA shifted their priorities to other projects. The building remains closed to the public and there is currently renewed interest in turning this building into an immersive archaeological museum depicting the 12,000-year archaeological record of Berrien County that showcases the BCHA's substantial collection of artifacts from the Paleoindian, Archaic, Woodland, and Potawatomi periods.

=== The Future ===
In 2019, a series of renovations to the properties began in an effort to modernize existing exhibits and to bring much needed repairs to the buildings. The Courthouse received new windows in 2019 and in 2020, the building's wood rot was repaired and the entire building was repainted. These were paid for by Berrien County, who is now the sole owner of the entire property, and is responsible for building maintenance and restoration under their lease with the BCHA. Interior renovations of permanent exhibit spaces have taken place each year since late 2019 and include the permanent exhibits of the 1839 Courthouse and the Sheriff's Residence. The Courthouse is still a designated Courthouse as stipulated in Michigan Legislation MCL - Section 600.1515 and is used for ceremonies, weddings, and educational programming. It is currently set up as a fully functional 1800s Courthouse and a special "Historic Court Trials" education program is even offered each semester to students where they can reenact real cases from 1839, 1840, and 1870 and then discuss justice and social justice issues of that time. The Berrien County Clerk's office has retained all of the historic court proceedings from Michigan's oldest courthouse, and there are now efforts to digitize these for greater access by the people of Michigan.

A new exhibit in the Murdoch Cabin profiling the Underground Railway, that came through this area, and Francis Murdoch's prolific defense of those escaping slavery prior to the Civil War and abolition advocacy will be installed in the Murdoch cabin. The garden will be upgraded to house historic gardening programming and a community herb garden. Bennett's Forge and Wagon shop has also been upgraded to exhibit several wagons, including the Dean's Dairy wagon which the local community raised $10,000 to retore. This is a working forge and will be a space for blacksmithing classes and demonstrations.

== The Buildings of the History Center at Courthouse Square ==
The Old Berrien County Courthouse Complex was renamed the History Center at Courthouse Square to better encompass the narrative the BCHA and Berrien County tell within its buildings. While five buildings are located on the property, only four are available to the public for current exhibits and events.

=== 1839 County Courthouse ===
The Courthouse was built in 1839 and is a traditional Greek Revival style. The lower level once housed county offices prior to the construction of the Records Building and remained the location of court-related needs until the county seat moved in 1984. In addition to serving as a courthouse, it has been an armory, a dance hall, and a community center. It was also used by the Christian Brethren, the Shakers, and the Seventh-day Adventists as a house of workshop. At the time of its construction, the building cost $2,500. In addition to being on the state and national Register of Historic Places, the Courthouse was named a Michigan Bar Association legal milestone in 2013.

=== County Records Building ===
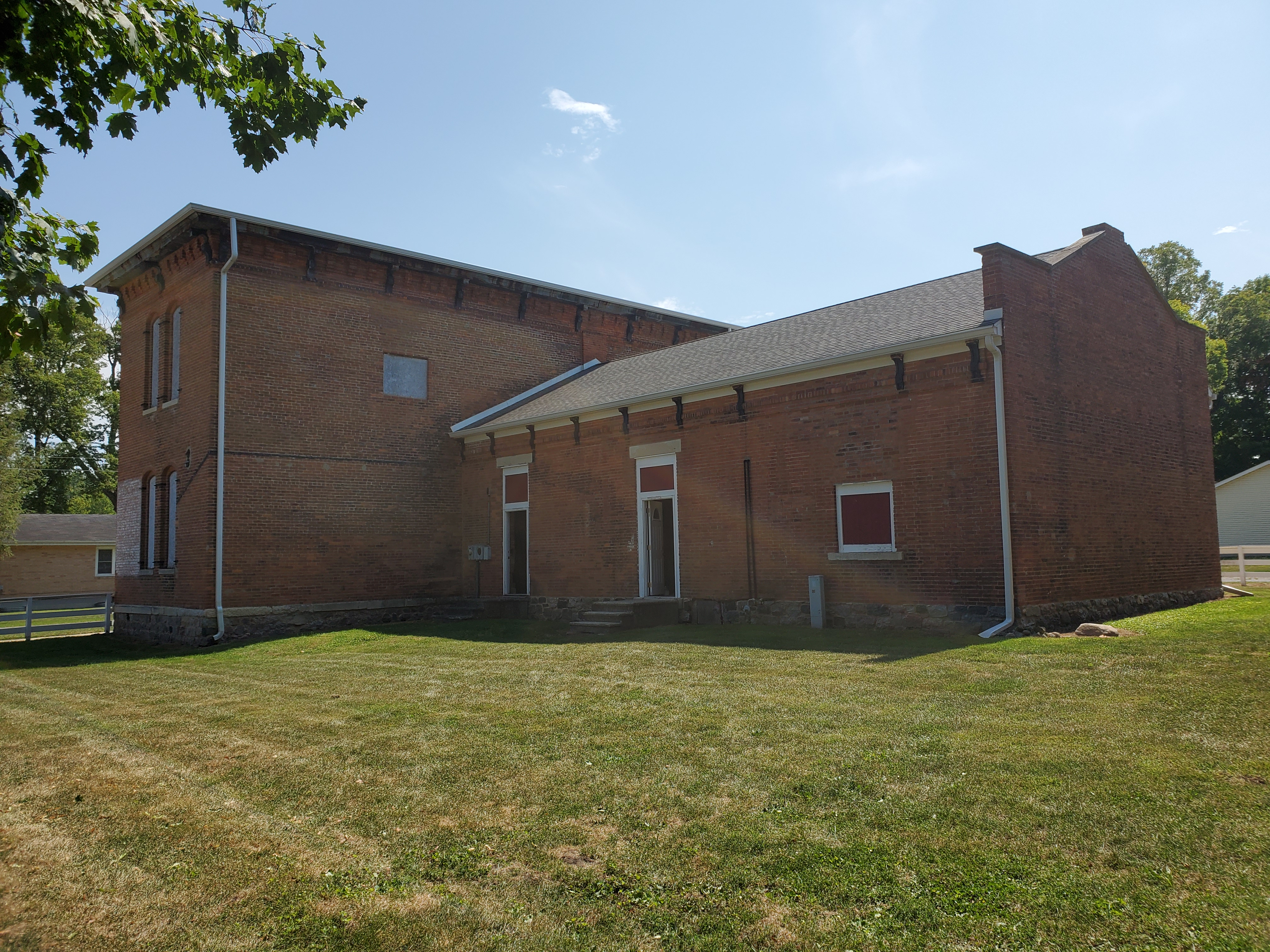

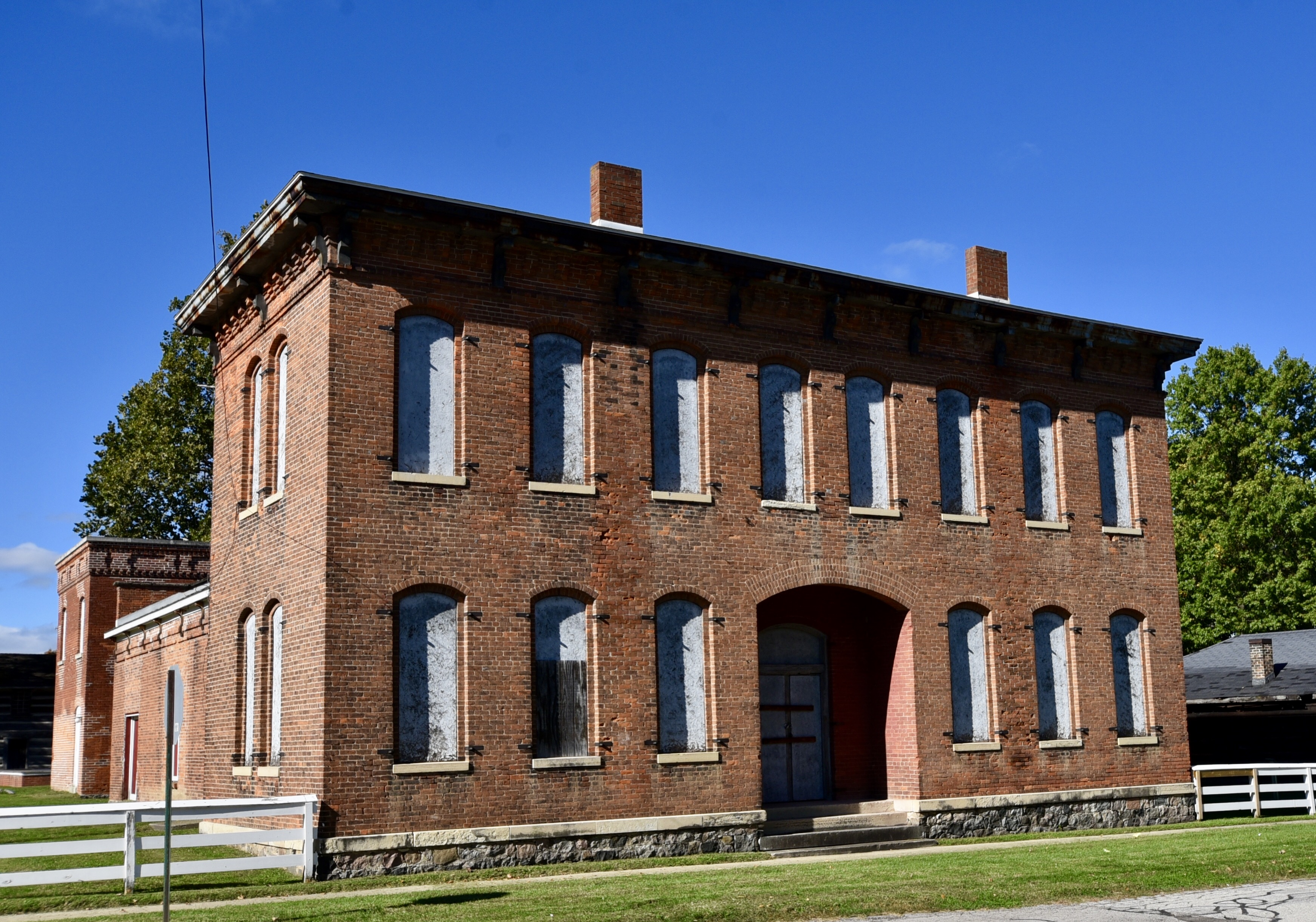

By 1859, the county was facing a serious issue – its size and needs had grown so much in twenty years that the offices in the lower level of the Courthouse were no longer functional space. That year, the commissioners approved the construction of a new office building with the requirement that it be fireproof.

Gilbert Avery was once again hired to design the one story brick structure and George H. Murdock was granted the construction contract to the tune of $3,000. However, Murdock had difficulty completing the project and at the behest of the county, Avery stepped in as the contractor and was able to complete the building in less than a year. In February 1860, the County Clerk, Treasurer, and Register of Deeds occupied their new space.

The building continued to serve the county well and it was expanded in 1873. The two story Italianate addition allowed for expansion of the offices for the county Clerk and Register of Deeds and it also housed the offices for the Judge of Probate. The building remained in use by the county until April 1894 when an election was held to move the town seat. The bitter event eventually ended in the favor of St. Joseph and that summer, everything was moved to a temporary location until the 1896 Courthouse was completed.

The buildings of the Courthouse Square (the courthouse, the Sheriff's residence, the jail, and the records building), faced a series of tenants and alterations to their structures for several years after the move. For a period of time in 1901 and 1902, the entire grounds was used as the temporary campus for Emmanuel Missionary College (the future Andrews University). This site was used for the administration's offices during the school year.

Eventually the land was broken up, with different buildings purchased by private individuals. The building was modified over the years, including two non-brick additions in the 20th century. While the building served as apartments for most of its post-county existence, until the 2000s, a laundromat and a local soft water company occupied the two story section. By the time the County looked into repurchasing the property in the 1960s, the building was in terrible condition despite its occupation.

The County committed itself to uniting the entirety of the Courthouse Square and by 1990, the building was under its ownership. While the BCHA debated on what to do with the building, tenants remained as occupants until at least 2000. Plans over the years had included offices, storage, and exhibit space in various styles, however, continued costs associated with the renovation of the building and the new updates proved to be prohibitive.

In 2006, the BCHA embarked on a capital campaign to raise 2.3 million dollars to finally renovate the building, however a one-two punch derailed it. The first was the Great Recession, which saw available funding sources evaporate. The second was a fire in October 2007, which destroyed the interior and the roof, but did not compromise the structural integrity of the building. By 2009, a new roof and point tucking repair had been completed, but the damaged windows remain boarded up.

=== Sheriff's Residence ===
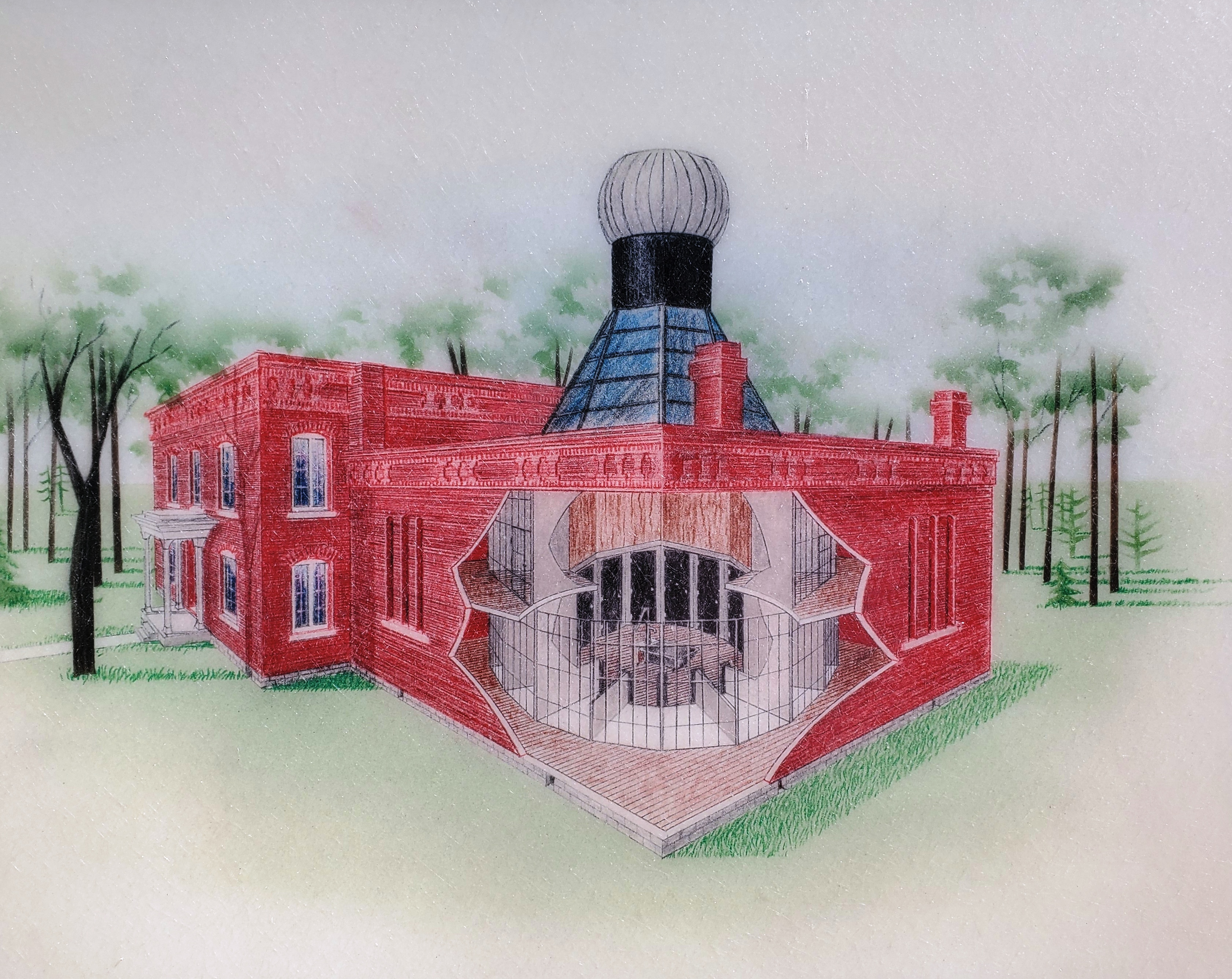

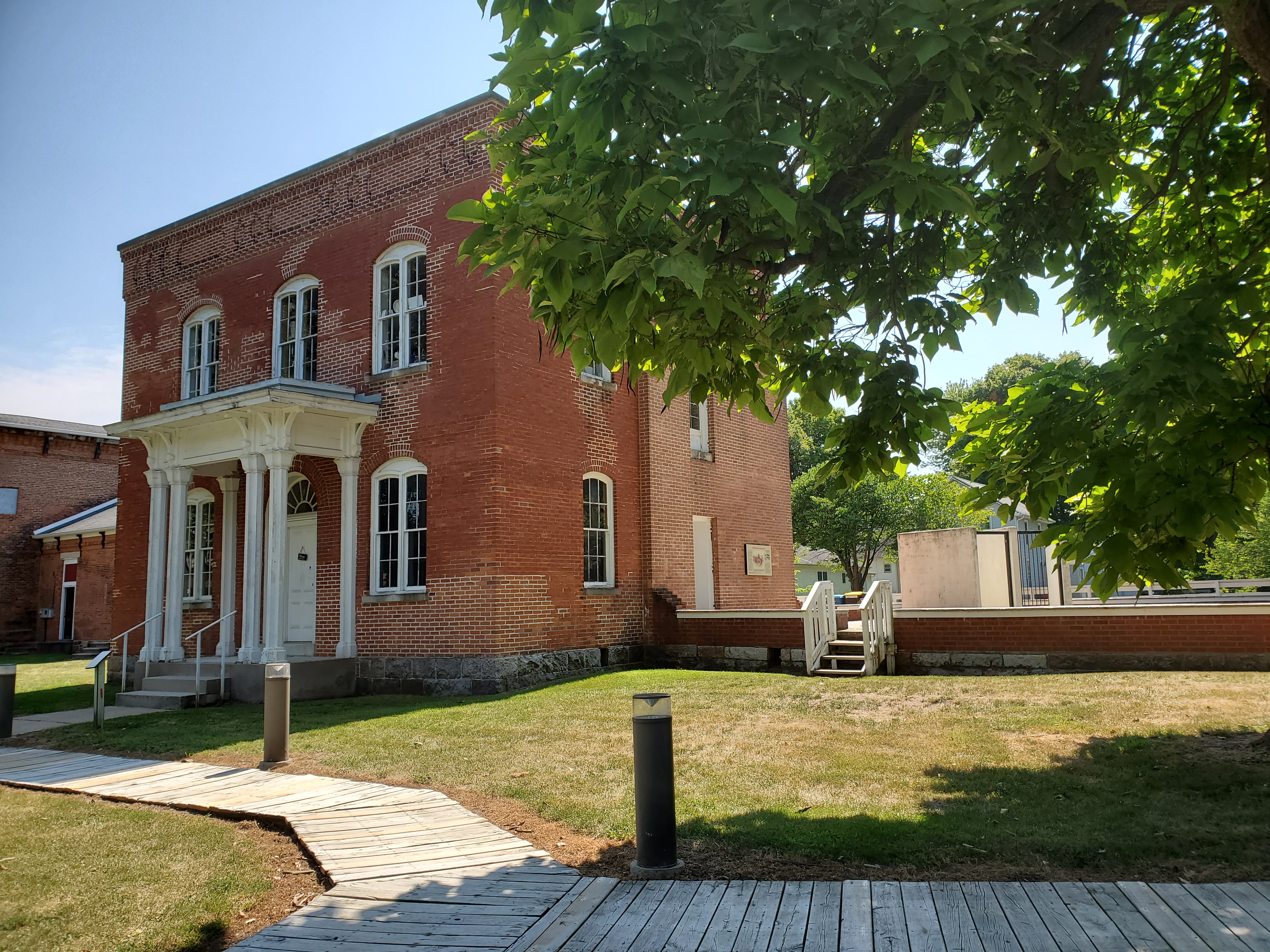

This building, completed in 1870, is two-stories tall and was designed with living space and the sheriff's office on the lower levels and bedrooms on the second floor. A rear wing housed the kitchen, the space is connected with a staircase and it was noted that kitchen was on both levels. The exterior porch as it is seen today was added to the building much later and was not part of the original design of the house. The office and at least on room upstairs had a pass-through door to the jail, allowing the sheriff to quickly access the space from inside the house. Nine sheriffs called this building home while the county seat was in Berrien Springs and like other structures on the ground, was essentially abandoned after the seat was moved to St. Joseph.

As with the Courthouse and Records building, the Sheriff's Residence was home to Emmanuel Missionary College (the future Andrews University) in 1901-1902 as classroom space. And after they moved to their new campus, the building remained empty for several years. Eventually the county sold the building to a private party and it was converted into apartments. Unlike the Records Building, however, no additions were added to the Sheriff's Residence and when the building was purchased by the Berrien County Historical Commission in 1975, the exterior updates went smoothly. Before interior restoration could begin, a fire swept through the upper levels, forcing a full renovation.

Under the original restoration project, only the office was designed as it had been in 1870 while the rest of the lower levels were converted to temporary exhibit space, allowing for the BCHA to host numerous exhibits throughout the year. The Office underwent renovation in 2021 and the time period of interpretation is now 1885. Additional permanent displays were added to the lower level at this time. The upper levels were converted to office spaces and the research library while the rear wing was modified to house the archives and collections. For a brief period of time in the 2000s, the lower level was home to the gift shop, but has since reverted to exhibit space.

=== Jail Plaza ===
The jail was completed at the same time as the residence and was also two-stories tall, but it was topped off with a skylight that illuminated the space and provided much needed ventilation. The skylight was almost whimsical, shaped like an upside down cone topped with a glass globe and gave the rectangular building a distinctive silhouette.

The interior was just as unique, with Avery employing a circular pattern to the jail cells layout, with the center rising the full two stories. The upper level contained eight larger cells designed to house women and children along with “less desperate characters.” The lower level cells were much smaller, with sixteen in total available to house male prisoners. The small size of these cells is often commented on by visitors, but the county jail wasn't meant for long-term housing of criminals and because of the design of the building, prisoners had a chance to take walks around the cells while remaining confined to the building.

The lower cells also had two doorways – the outer being traditional cell bars while the interior was a solid door (likely made of metal) that allowed for prisoners to use the washtub located in the core. The pump was connected to a 700 barrel rainwater cistern, which was located beneath the building. Those housed on the upper levels were led in through an empty cell to use the space before being escorted back to their cell.

The design worked sometimes too well and in July 1883, eight prisoners took advantage of the layout to launch a daring escape. After removing the tub, they pumped the cistern until the levels were low enough for them to drop inside. They dropped into the now open hole and began to dig a tunnel under the north wall of the jail, but the soft ground caused it to collapse and the prisoners were forced to tunnel upwards. They were successful and soon were on the lam. The sheriff was joined by the county clerk and several townspeople and within days most of them were recaptured. The story was quite thrilling and people from around the county turned the site into a short-lived tourist attraction. Reports indicate a Niles woman took samples of the earth from their excavation site home with her.

After the county moved to St. Joseph, the building was left to fall in disrepair. By 1916, time and vandalism forced the county to tear down the building. Nothing was done with the former site until the BCHA created the Jail Plaza in the early 1990s. Funded by several organizations, the plaza includes a layout of the lower level cells and two of them were fully reconstructed.

=== Murdock log house ===
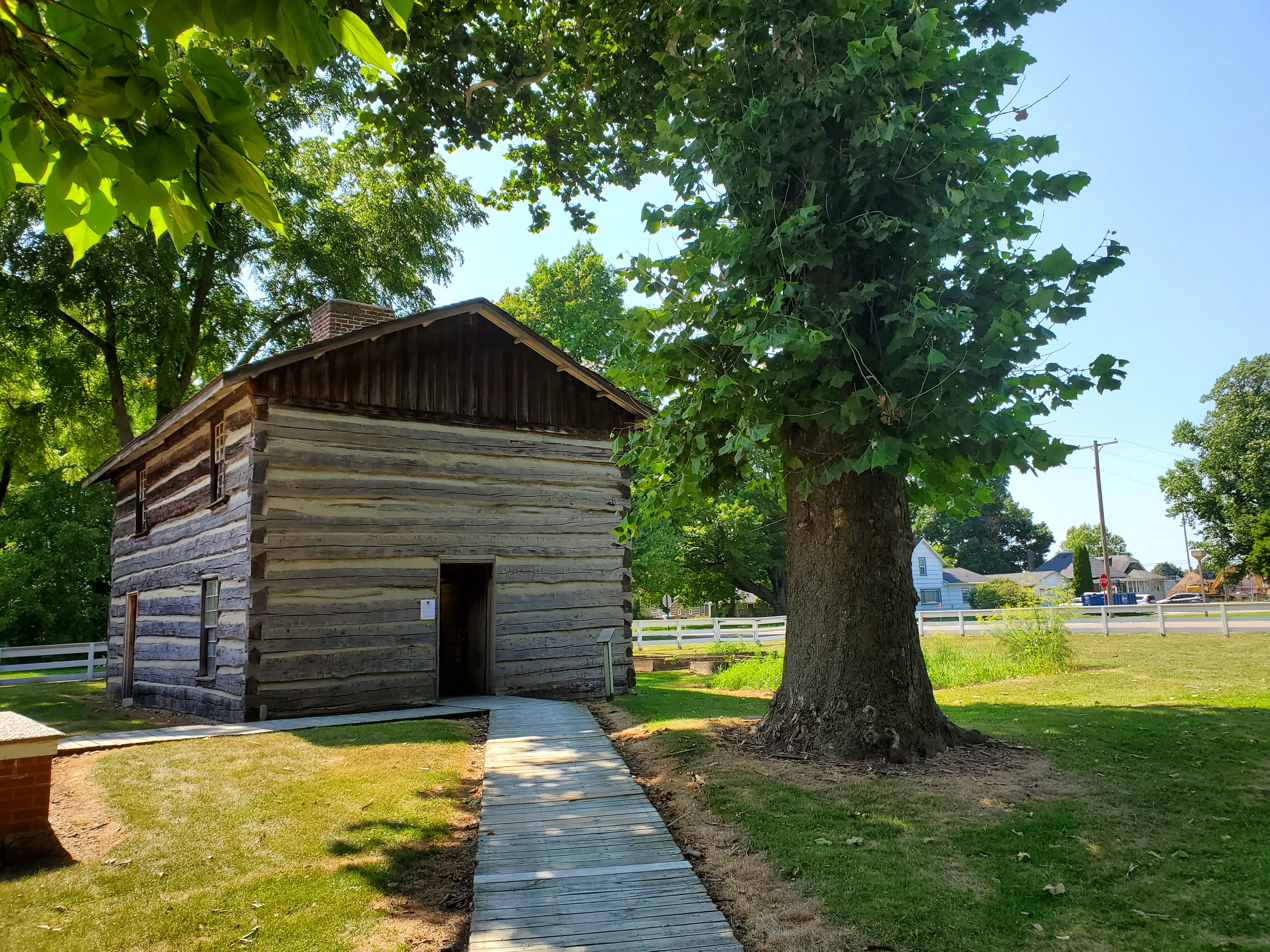

The cabin was dated to 1830, the year Francis Murdoch and his family arrived in Berrien County, although it is possible that the home was built prior to their arrival and may have been started in 1829. Most first time log cabin structures were simple in nature – something to get the family started in their new home. Research indicated that the house had been two story since the very beginning and its likely given the Kimmels’ standing in Berrien County along with Francis’ career as a lawyer, a quality home would have been important to the family.

It is believed that the precursor to the building's modern exterior was added around the time of the Civil War, with portions of the back wall removed for a new extension. As families came and went, the house continued to be modernize, but the cabin remained hidden to the public. In fact, upon its discovery, several individuals who had lived in the home in the past expressed shock and surprise that the cabin had been there all along, although the residents at the time of the home's presumed demolition knew it was a log cabin, but had not know its historical significance.

Originally the Historical Commission had hoped to leave the house in its location and build a park around it. However, that did not come to fruition and for five years the house stood on Kephart Lane, the victim of time, weather, and vandals. Eventually, recognition from the state pushed the preservation plans forward. Funds from various donors and municipalities made the move possible. The building was moved intact to the Courthouse Square in 1973 and area experts created new wall sections to match the original in order to close the holes. In the early years, the house was outfitted in period artifacts, but currently the home is semi-empty when not in use by re-enactors and the upper level is off limits to the public until repairs can be made.

By the early 1990s, a historically accurate garden was added by the Michigan State University extension master gardener group as part of their course completion project. Plans to renovate and expand the garden in addition to updating the cabin is on the books for the Historical Association.

The Murdoch Cabin is one of the oldest surviving residential structures in the state of Michigan, with only a handful of other buildings surpassing it in age. There is debate if it is the oldest two-story log cabin as the Davenport House on Mackinac Island, which is older, is believed to be a two-story structure. However, with the modernization of the Davenport House, Murdoch remains the oldest two-story cabin in its original state.

=== Bennett's Forge ===
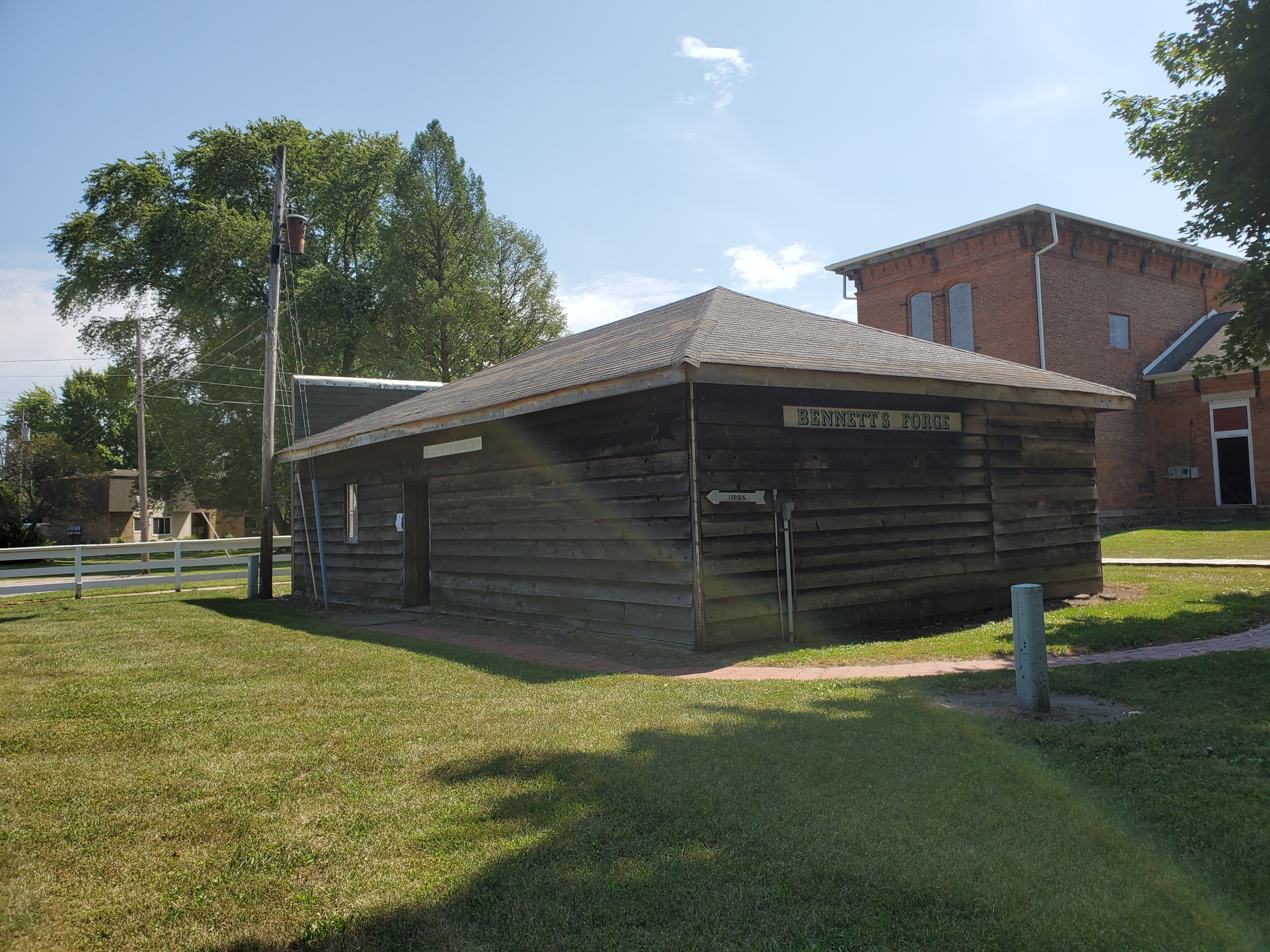

Not long after the Seventh-day Adventist Church purchased the majority of available land around the courthouse, they began to expand with the addition of two buildings along Madison Street. The first was a small cinder block building in the 1930s that became the home of the Women's Auxiliary group and the second, was a medical building that eventually became part of Andrews University.

By the early 1970s, these two buildings and their land were purchased by the County in an effort to unite the original Courthouse Square. The Historical Association and the County agreed to demolish them both as they had no historic value at the time. Other plans for the use of the space were floated by both groups over the next few years until 1977 when a donation changed everything.

George H. Bennett, a long-time resident of Berrien County, had died and a memorial fund had been created. The family knew of Bennett's love of history and his support of the on-going project in Berrien Springs. The family approached the Historical Association, suggesting that the Auxiliary Building become home to a forge and buggy shop, allowing for the grounds to have yet another building that interpreted early county history.

They agreed and by August 1978, the renovation was completed. The interior and exterior walls were covered in cedar boards, giving a historic look to the structure and the interior was split in half – one side serving as the buggy shop and the other as the forge. Originally, a wall separated the forge from the public, but it was eventually removed to open the space more when it wasn't in use.

Over the years, the building has been the site of blacksmithing demonstrations for various events and programs, including a festival dedicated to the art in 2016. The buggy shop eventually became storage for the BCHA's over-sized collections, including a wagon and a large boat discovered in the St. Joseph River in the 1970s. This section is off-limits to the public as it is currently unsafe to enter.
