= Hannibal Day =

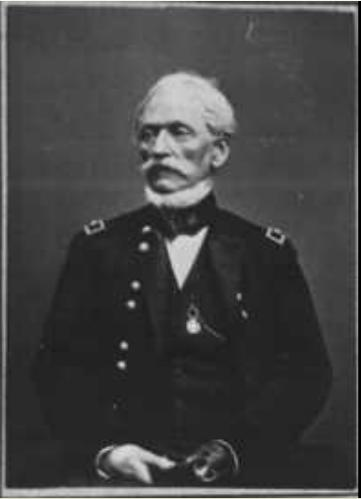
- Hannibal Day, promoted to Brevet Brigadier General on 13 March 1865
- Born: February 15, 1804; Montpelier, Vermont
- Died: March 26, 1891 (aged 87); Morristown, New Jersey
- Burial place: Evergreen Cemetery, Leominster, Massachusetts
- Military career
- Allegiance: United States of America; Union (1861 – 1865)
- Branch: United States Army
- Service years: 1823-1869
- Rank: Colonel; Brevet Brigadier General
- Unit: United States Army Infantry Branch
- Commands: 2nd U.S. Infantry; 6th U.S. Infantry; First Brigade, Second Division, V Corps; Fort Hamilton, New York
- Conflicts: Black Hawk War; Seminole War; Mexican–American War; American Civil War; Gettysburg campaign; Battle of Gettysburg

Hannibal Day (February 15, 1804 – March 26, 1891) served as an officer in the United States Army. His career spanned 46 years, and included the Black Hawk War, Seminole War, Mexican–American War, and American Civil War. One of the oldest officers to serve in the Union Army, Day commanded a brigade in the Army of the Potomac and took part in combat at the Battle of Gettysburg.

== Early life ==
Hannibal Day was born in Montpelier, Vermont on February 15, 1804, the son of Dr. Sylvester Day (1778-1851), a career United States Army surgeon, and Avis (Bliss) Day (1780-1859). He was educated in various locations as his father's work took the family from one military post to another.

During the War of 1812, Sylvester Day and the garrison of Fort Michilimackinac, Michigan, including Hannibal Day, were taken prisoner by the British Army. The British held the prisoners at Fort Detroit during July and August 1812, then transported them by boat to Fort Erie, Ontario, where they were released on parole while British and American commanders negotiated a prisoner exchange. Later that year, army and United States Navy forces under the command of Jesse Elliott effected a rescue of the prisoners, who were carried by boat from the fort to Elliott's ships on Lake Erie.

After the war, Hannibal Day was raised and educated in Vermont. In 1818, he was appointed to the United States Military Academy. Ill health caused him to delay his enrollment until 1819. He graduated in 1823, ranked 23rd in a class of 35.

== Start of career ==
Day was commissioned as a second lieutenant of Infantry on July 1, 1823 and assigned to the 2nd Infantry Regiment. He remained primarily with the 2nd Infantry until 1862. Day served at Fort Brady, Michigan from 1823 to 1828 and on surveying and topographical duty in the Western United States from 1828 to 1831. He served at Fort Niagara, New York and Fort Dearborn, Illinois in 1832 and 1833, and took part in the Black Hawk War.

From 1833 to 1836, Day was on duty at Hancock Barracks, Maine and he served at Fort Independence, Massachusetts in 1836. He served on recruiting duty at various posts from 1836 to 1838 and took part in the Seminole War of 1838-1839. Day became ill in Florida and was on convalescent leave from 1839 to 1841. He returned to Florida in 1841 and remained until 1842. He served with the 2nd Infantry in Buffalo, New York from 1842 to 1845 and Detroit, Michigan from 1845 to 1846. He took part in the Mexican-American War from 1846 to 1847, serving with the 2nd Infantry as part of David E. Twiggs' Brigade and participating in battles including Veracruz, Cerro Gordo, Contreras, Churubusco, Moline del Rey and Chapultepec.

Day served on recruiting duty from 1847 to 1848. He served at Fort Hamilton, New York in 1848, then completed a sea voyage to California between 1848 1849. After arriving in California, Day was on frontier duty at Sutterville, California, (1849), Bear Creek, (1849), Camp Far West (1850‑1851), and Benicia (1852‑1853). Day served at Jefferson Barracks, Missouri in 1854, then performed frontier duty at Fort Ridgely, Minnesota from 1854 to 1855. He was posted to Fort Ripley, Minnesota from 1855 to 1856. He then served in the Dakota Territory, performing duty at Fort Randall from 1856 to 1858, Fort Laramie from 1859 to 1860, and Fort Abercrombie from 1860 to 1861.

== American Civil War ==
Day was promoted to the rank of lieutenant colonel of the 2nd U.S. Infantry on February 25, 1861. From August to December 1861 he commanded the 2nd Infantry and was stationed in the Georgetown area of Washington, D.C. He was on recruiting duty from December 1861 to June 1863, and was promoted to commander of the 6th U.S. Infantry as a colonel on June 7, 1862.

Day joined the Army of the Potomac on June 28, 1863. He served as commander of First Brigade, Second Division, V Corps under Brigadier General Romeyn B. Ayres, which included combat at the Battle of Gettysburg. His brigade sustained several casualties when it was attacked during deployment into the Wheatfield on July 2, 1863. The attack was executed by the brigade of Brigadier General William T. Wofford, and it cost Day's brigade 382 killed and wounded. Afterwards, Day's brigade was combined with that of Sidney Burbank, serving under Burbank in the Bristoe Campaign and the Mine Run Campaign. They were later made part of a brigade under Ayers in General Charles Griffin's First Division, V Corps.

Day was one of the oldest officers commanding at Gettysburg; only his classmate George S. Greene was older. He was officially retired on August 1, 1863, but recalled for continued service. Day left the Army of the Potomac on August 22, 1863 and commanded Fort Hamilton in New York from August 1863 until June 8, 1864. He served on military commissions and courts martial from July 25, 1864 until his final retirement on June 15, 1869. On March 13, 1865, he received promotion to the brevet rank of brigadier general in recognition of his many years of service.

== Death and burial ==
Day died in Morristown, New Jersey on March 26, 1891. He was buried at Evergreen Cemetery in Leominster, Massachusetts. At the time of his death, he was the third-oldest living West Point graduate, with only Colonel William C. Young (Class of 1822) and Major General George S. Greene (class of 1823) having lived longer.

== Family ==
In 1831, Day married Anna Maria Houghton (1808-1891), the daughter of Colonel Thomas Houghton and Mary Legate (Chase) Houghton. Their children included:

- Sylvester Henry Day (1840-1926), who served as postmaster of Carson City, Nevada and adjutant general of the Nevada National Guard
- Russell Hamilton Day (1845-1882), an Army officer who died at Fort Thornburgh, Utah while on active duty
- Murray Simpson Day (1845-1878), a United States Navy officer who died at sea. He was married to Anna Mary Greene, the daughter of Major General George S. Greene.
- Lavinia Day (1847-1933), the wife of Army surgeon John Van Rensselaer Hoff

== Effective dates of promotion ==
During his career, Day was promoted from second lieutenant to colonel, and received promotion to brigadier general by brevet:

- Second lieutenant, July 1, 1823
- First lieutenant, April 4, 1832
- Captain, July 7, 1838
- Major, February 23, 1852
- Lieutenant colonel, February 25, 1861
- Colonel, January 7, 1862
- Brevet brigadier general, March 13, 1865

== Sources ==
=== Books ===
- Association of the Graduates of the United States Military Academy (1891). Annual Reunion, June 12, 1891. Saginaw, MI: Seeman & Peters – via Google Books.
- Dyer, Frederick H. (1908). A Compendium of the War of the Rebellion. Vol. 1. De s Moines, IA: Dyer Publishing Company – via Google Books.
- Greene, George Sears (1903). The Greenes of Rhode Island. New York, NY: The Knickerbocker Press – via Google Books.
- Pfanz, Harry W. (1987). Gettysburg – The Second Day. Chapel Hill, NC: University of North Carolina Press. ISBN 978-0-8078-1749-0 – via Google Books.

=== Internet ===
- Thayer, Bill. "Hannibal Day: Compilation of Entries in Cullum's Register, Volumes I to IV". penelope.uchicago.edu/. Bill Thayer.
