= Mission Church (Michigan) =

Historic church in Michigan, United States

- U.S. National Register of Historic Places
- Michigan State Historic Site
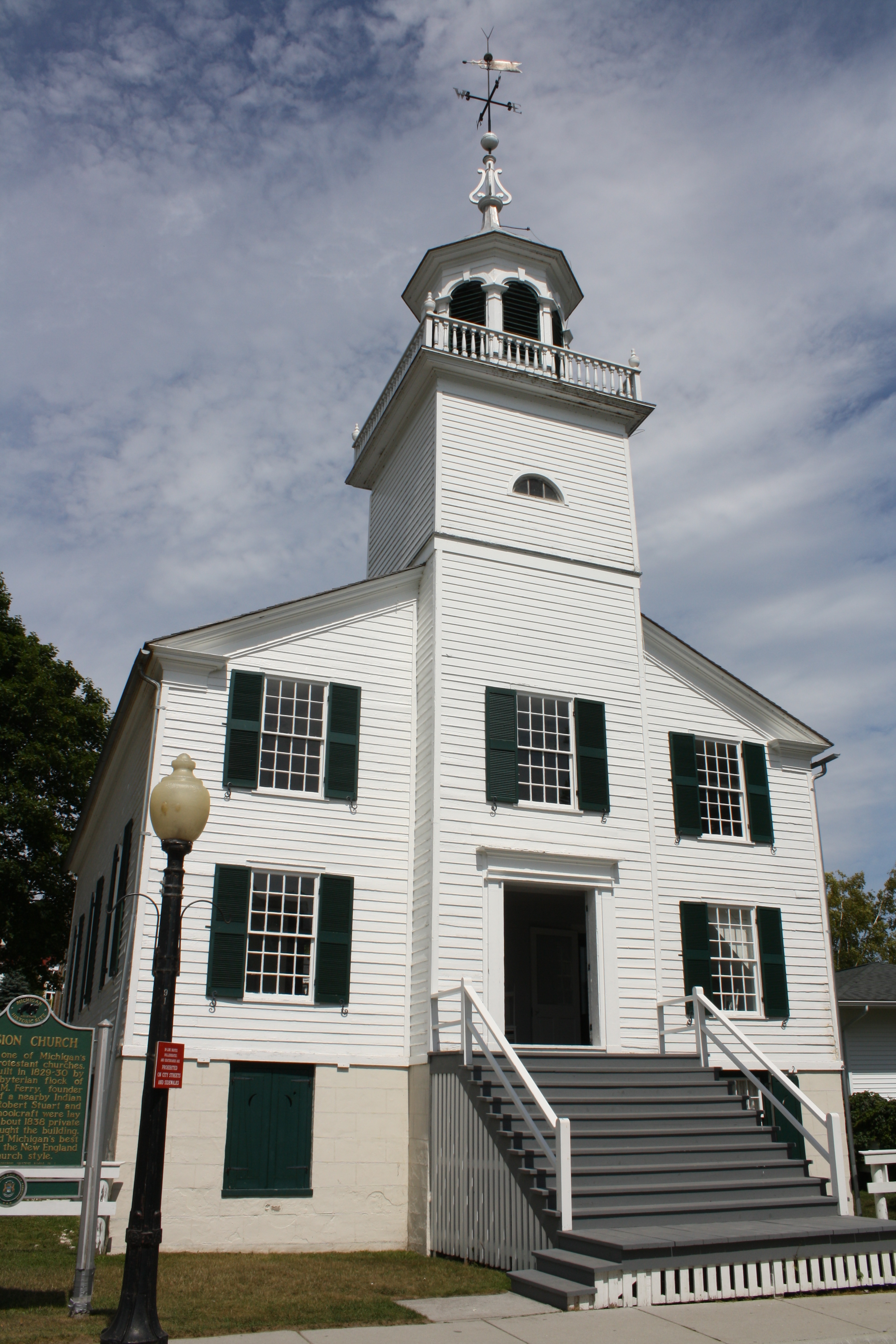
- Front of the church in 2011

- Location within Michigan Location within the United States
- Interactive map
- Location: Huron St. at Truscott St., Mackinac Island, Michigan
- Coordinates: 45°51′0″N 84°36′32″W
- Built: 1829–1830
- Built by: Martin Heydenburk
- Architectural style: Colonial, New England Colonial
- NRHP reference No.: 71000409
- Added to NRHP: January 25, 1971

The Mission Church is a historic Congregational church located at the corner of Huron and Tuscott Streets on Mackinac Island, Michigan, United States. Built in 1829, it is the oldest surviving church building in the state of Michigan. In 1971, the Mission Church was listed on the National Register of Historic Places.

The parish of Sainte Anne Church (Mackinac Island) was organized before this, as the island had a historic French and Metis population before Anglo-American settlement. Sainte Anne’s original building was replaced by a new structure in 1874, which is still used.

== Description ==
The Mission Church was constructed in the New England Colonial church style. It is a 1-1/2 story rectangular frame building sitting atop a plastered stone foundation and covered with clapboard siding. The base construction is of heavy timber, and the interior is plastered. The front facade has a double-door center entrance, and boasts a square tower topped with an octagonal belfry. The roof is covered with wooden shingles.

== History ==
French Jesuits established a mission to the Ottawa in this area in the 17th century. Their church did not have a permanent priest after suppression of the Jesuits in Canada in the late 18th century; the log structure was moved from Fort Michilimackinac to Mackinac Island about 1780–1781 by British orders. This Sainte Anne Church was used by the French and Metis residents who were the majority of the permanent population through the early 1800s, most connected to the fur trade. The church did not have a permanent priest for some years, but devoted parishioners kept the congregation active. Magdelaine Laframboise, a prominent Métis fur trader, donated land next to her mansion for the church when it needed a new site. In 1874, a new Sainte Anne Church was built there which is still in use.

=== Original Protestant mission ===
The first permanent Christian pastoral presence on Mackinac Island was that of David Bacon, who lived on the island for a short time beginning in 1802. Following the conclusion of the War of 1812, the number of Anglo-American residents on the island and in the region increased. In 1821, Jedidiah Morse (the father of Samuel F. B. Morse) was reputed to have preached on the island on a Sunday; he later advocated for a permanent Protestant mission on the island.

In 1823, missionaries William Montague Ferry and his wife Amanda founded a Protestant mission on the southeast corner of Mackinac Island at the location since known as Mission Point. This mission was primarily to educate Indian youth, and enrolled students from all around the Great Lakes region. In 1825, they built a boardinghouse and school at the site, for some time the schoolroom was also used as a chapel. During the winter of 1828–29, the Ferrys' congregation rapidly grew, adding 33 people to total 52 congregants. Soon the churchgoers included Island residents such as American Fur Company magnate Robert Stuart, geographer and ethnographer Henry Schoolcraft, who was married to an English-Ojibwe woman, Jane Johnston Schoolcraft; and carpenter Martin Heydenburk. In 1829–1830 their congregation built this church. Heydenburk and helpers cut and planed lumber on the main shore, transported it to the island, and finished the church over the winter. The church was dedicated on March 4, 1831.

The congregation eventually grew to number about 80. But changes soon came to the island: the American Fur Company withdrew as the fur trade declined in the 1830s. The tribes which the mission school served were being removed to locations west of the Mississippi River. The mission, and with it the church congregation, declined. The Ferrys left Mackinac Island in 1834, and in 1837, the mission was closed. In 1838 the mission property, including the church, was sold to a private owner.

=== Later years ===
The church was used for some years for political meetings and plays, and occasionally for church services. In 1870 it was reroofed and used temporarily by the Catholic Church for services until the current Sainte Anne's was constructed in 1874. The building continued to deteriorate.

In the late 19th century, the island became used a summer resort destination for people from major cities such as Chicago and later Detroit. The Grand Hotel was constructed in 1887. The seasonal influx of summer residents soon overwhelmed the space available for the island's small Protestant congregation. In 1894, a group of residents purchased the church for nondenominational services, restored it, and opened it in the summer of 1895.

It was used for years for Protestant services, primarily in the summer. The Mackinac Island State Park Commission purchased the building in 1955 and did some renovation. In the 1980s, the church was extensively restored. As of 2012, the church is open to the public daily in the summer, and can be rented for weddings.

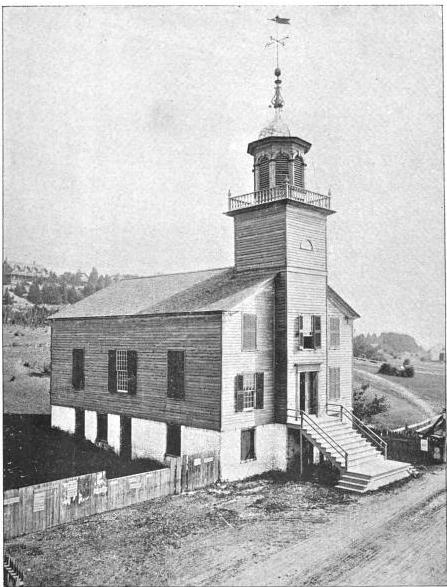
Mission Church, c. 1895

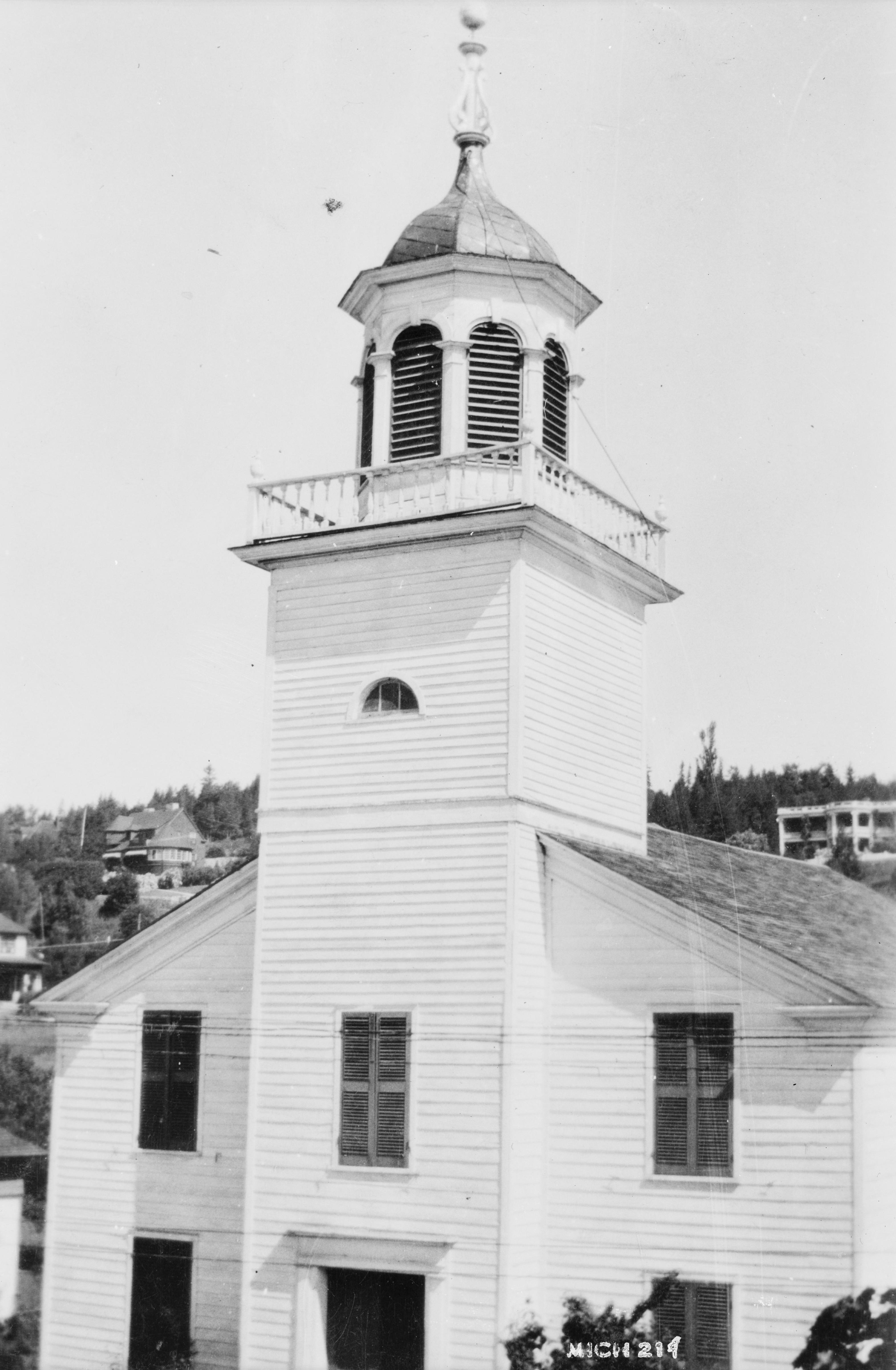
Front of church in 1936

c. 1900

== See also ==
- Oldest churches in the United States
