= Benjamin Kendrick Pierce =

United States Army officer (1790–1850)

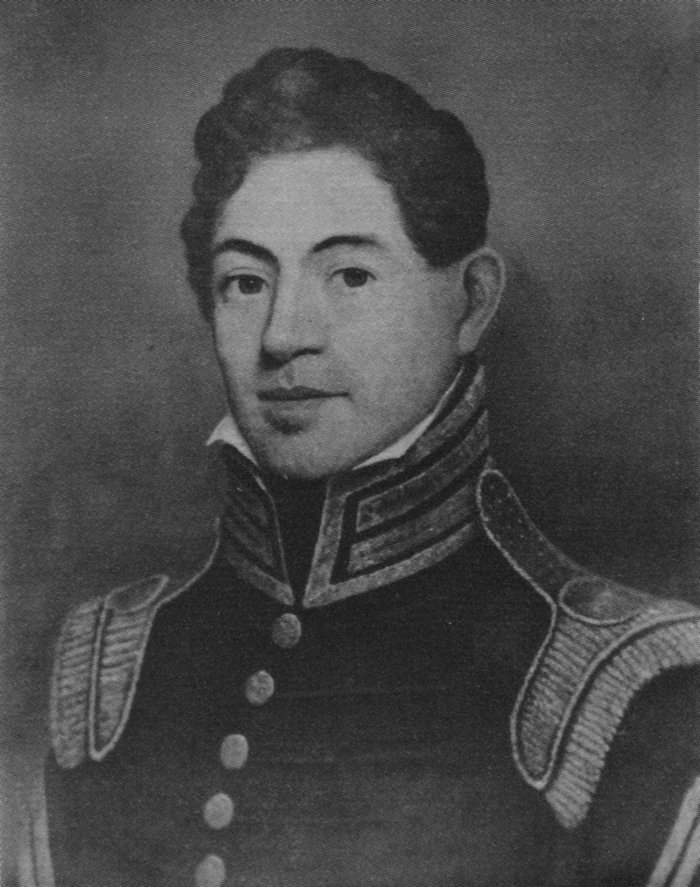
- Pierce at the time of his 1817 wedding
- Born: August 29, 1790; Hillsborough, New Hampshire, US
- Died: April 1, 1850 (aged 59); New York City, US
- Burial place: Cypress Hills National Cemetery, New York
- Spouse(s): Josephine "Josette" Laframboise (m. 1817; died 1820) Amanda Boykin (m. 1823; died 1831) Louisa Gertrude Read (m. 1838; died 1840)
- Children: 7
- Relatives: Benjamin Pierce (father); Franklin Pierce (brother); John McNeil Jr. (brother-in-law); Magdelaine Marcot (mother-in-law); James B. Ricketts (son-in-law)
- Military career
- Allegiance: United States of America
- Branch: United States Army
- Service years: 1812–1850
- Rank: Lieutenant Colonel (USA); Colonel (Florida Militia)
- Unit: U.S. Army Field Artillery Branch
- Commands: Fort Holmes; Fort Mackinac; Fort Barrancas; Mounted Creek Regiment (Militia); Fort Delaware; Fort Hamilton; Fort Pierce; Plattsburgh Barracks; Hancock Barracks; Fort Adams; 1st U.S. Regiment of Artillery
- Wars: War of 1812; Second Seminole War; Mexican–American War

Benjamin Kendrick Pierce (August 29, 1790 – April 1, 1850) was a career officer in the United States Army. He was a son of New Hampshire Governor Benjamin Pierce and brother of President Franklin Pierce. Benjamin K. Pierce was a veteran of the War of 1812, the Second Seminole War, and the Mexican–American War, and rose to the rank of lieutenant colonel in the Army and colonel in the Florida Militia.

== Early life ==
The eldest son of Benjamin Pierce and Anna (Kendrick) Pierce, and a descendant of Thomas Pierce (1618–1683), who was born in Norwich, England and settled in the Massachusetts Bay Colony, Benjamin Kendrick Pierce was born in Hillsborough, New Hampshire, on August 29, 1790, and named for his maternal grandfather. His father was determined that his sons receive college educations, and Benjamin K. Pierce attended Phillips Exeter Academy in preparation for admission to a university. He studied at Dartmouth College from 1807 until 1810, when he was dismissed for carrying out pranks and practical jokes, including damaging a campus building by firing a loaded cannon during an 1810 Independence Day celebration. He then studied law with Hillsborough attorney David Starrett to prepare for a career as a lawyer.

== Military career ==
=== War of 1812 ===
Pierce's military career started when he was commissioned as a first lieutenant in the 3rd Artillery on March 12, 1812, shortly before the outbreak of the War of 1812. He commanded a battery called Pierce's Company of Artillery, and took part in several battles, including Fort Oswego, Fort Erie, Chippawa, and Lundy's Lane.

=== Continued military service ===
Pierce remained in the Army following the War of 1812, serving primarily in the 1st, 3rd and 4th Artillery Regiments. He was promoted to captain in the 1st Artillery on October 1, 1813.

His post-war assignments included command of Company O, 1st United States Infantry (an Artillery unit), with frequent command of Fort Holmes and Fort Mackinac, depending on whether there were officers senior to him at Fort Mackinac (1816–1821). Pierce's brother John Sullivan Pierce and brother-in-law John McNeil Jr. were also in the Army and performing duty at Fort Holmes and Fort Mackinac during Pierce's time in Michigan.

His other assignments included Fort Barrancas (1821–1824), during which he was promoted to brevet major in June 1823 for "faithful service in one grade for ten years", Fort Delaware (1827–1831), and Fort Hamilton (1832–1834, 1834–1835).

=== Second Seminole War ===
The Second Seminole War started when Seminoles under Osceola's leadership were at war with white settlers in Florida massacred Major Francis L. Dade and his command on December 28, 1835. In the fall of 1836 Pierce was assigned to Fort Defiance and Fort Drane. Pierce was promoted to permanent major in the 1st Artillery on 11 June 1836, and to brevet lieutenant colonel in October 1836 (to rank from 21 August 1836) for "distinguished service in [the] affair at Fort Drane, Florida".

In addition to his Army commission, in October 1836 Pierce was simultaneously appointed a colonel in the Florida Militia and assigned as the militia's quartermaster general and commander of a mounted regiment of Creek Indians who had allied themselves with the Americans against the Seminoles. In response to Dade's Massacre, Pierce's command engaged and routed Osceola and his followers.

At the November 1, 1836, battle in the Wahoo Swamp in the region south of the Withlacoochee River Cove, Pierce was part of a force which again defeated a sizable contingent of Seminoles. His commander mentioned Pierce favorably in his written report, which led to his being recommended a few years later for a brevet promotion to colonel.

While commanding a contingent of the 1st Artillery Regiment on the Indian River in 1838, Pierce directed construction of a blockhouse and other buildings, and the post was named Fort Pierce in his honor.

=== Later military service ===
When it appeared in 1838 that Thomas Jesup, recently replaced as commander of the effort against the Seminoles in Florida, might also resign as the Army's Quartermaster General, Pierce requested that his brother Franklin, then serving in the United States Senate, use his influence to help obtain the position for Pierce. Jesup opted not to retire, and continued to serve as Quartermaster General until his death in 1860. After his service in the Second Seminole War, Pierce was assigned as commander of Fort Hamilton in Brooklyn, New York, until he was reassigned to Plattsburgh Barracks in upstate New York. In May 1840 Pierce was reassigned to Hancock Barracks near Houlton, Maine, where he was promoted to permanent lieutenant colonel in the 1st Artillery Regiment on March 19, 1842.

From September 1843 until July 1845 he was the commander of Fort Adams in Newport, Rhode Island. In June 1844 he was among several officers Jesup proposed for brevet promotions to recognize their service in the Second Seminole War. Jesup recommended advancement to brevet colonel for Pierce, and President John Tyler made the nominations. However, the United States Senate took no action, and Tyler withdrew them on February 17, 1845, shortly before the end of his presidency.

=== Mexican–American War ===
Early in the Mexican–American War, Pierce led the 1st Artillery Regiment from the United States as far as the Port Isabel, Texas mobilization station, but ill health prevented him from commanding actively in Mexico. He subsequently commanded Fort Barrancas near Pensacola, Florida, until continued ill health resulted in his transfer to Fort Adams in Newport, Rhode Island, which was noted for its healthy climate.

Pierce served as commander of Fort Adams from June 1847 until September 1848. During the war, Fort Adams was maintained by a small detachment that was responsible for mobilizing and demobilizing troops sent to Texas and Mexico.

== Death and burial ==
In the final months of his life Pierce's health failed as the result of his long military service under difficult conditions, and he resided in a hospital in New York City.

Pierce died in New York City on April 1, 1850, after 38 years of service in the Army. He was originally buried in the military cemetery at Fort Jay on Governor's Island. All the remains there were later re-interred in Cypress Hills National Cemetery in Brooklyn, and Pierce is buried at Section OS, Site 20. His daughter Elizabeth Boykin Pierce is buried with him, and her grave is unmarked except for the words "his daughter" on the back of Pierce's gravestone.

== Family ==
Pierce was married three times. While commanding Fort Mackinac in 1817 he married Josephine "Josette" Laframboise. Josette Laframboise's father was Joseph Laframboise, a French-Canadian fur trader and merchant, and her mother was Magdelaine Marcot, a fur trader and the daughter of a French Canadian father and Odawa Indian mother. Josette Laframboise was born in 1795 and died in childbirth or shortly after giving birth in 1820.

In 1823 Pierce was serving in Pensacola, Florida, when he married Amanda Boykin in Alabama. She was born in 1805 and died at Fort Delaware in January 1831. Her funeral took place in early February, and afterwards the coffin containing her remains was stored in a building at Fort Delaware. That same night a fire broke out, and Pierce along with four of his soldiers braved the flames to remove the remains, enabling them to be buried in the spring. Much of the post burned, but Pierce and his soldiers were able to protect his children by keeping his quarters from catching fire.

Pierce was the commander at Plattsburgh Barracks in 1838 when he married Louisa Gertrude Read of Delaware, the great-granddaughter of Declaration of Independence signer George Read. She died in 1840.

Pierce's children with Josette Laframboise included Harriet Josephine Pierce (1818–1854) and Benjamin Langdon Pierce (1820–1820). Harriet Pierce was raised primarily by the Laframboise family after her mother's death, and was the wife of General James B. Ricketts. Mary Brewerton Ricketts, the daughter of Harriet Pierce and James Ricketts, was the wife of General William Montrose Graham.

With Amanda Boykin, Pierce's children included Elizabeth Boykin Pierce (1827–1847), Charlotte Boykin Pierce (1828–1852), Henry Jackson Pierce (1829–1830), Amanda Boykin Pierce (1830–1857), and Benjamin Kendrick Pierce, Jr. (born and died in 1831).

== Legacy ==
By right of his father's service as an officer in the Continental Army during the American Revolution, Pierce was a hereditary member of the Massachusetts Society of the Cincinnati. After Pierce's death, he was succeeded by his brother Franklin.

Pierce was highly regarded by his contemporaries, and Army records contain commendations from superiors Jacob Brown, Richard K. Call, and Thomas S. Jesup.

The post Pierce founded on the Indian River in Florida during the Second Seminole War was christened Fort Pierce by his subordinates, one of whom wrote that "our worthy commander" had earned the distinction by superior performance of his duty.

Fort Pierce, a settlement near the site of Pierce's Indian River fort was founded as a town in the 1860s and incorporated as a city in 1901, and is named for him.

Pierce owned land in Michigan which was later developed as part of the town of Birmingham, but he never resided there. In addition to Pierce Street in Fort Pierce, Birmingham's Pierce Street and Pierce Elementary School are all named for Benjamin K. Pierce.

Pierce is the subject of a short biography, Louis H. Burbey's Our Worthy Commander: The Life and Times of Benjamin K. Pierce, in Whose Honor Fort Pierce was Named (1976). In addition, Pierce is the subject of a second work, 2014's Searching for Lt. Col. Benjamin Kendrick Pierce, by Thomas and Margaret Lee.

== Dates of rank ==
- First Lieutenant, 3rd Artillery – 12 March 1812
- Captain, 1st Artillery – 1 October 1813
- Brevet Major – June 1823 for "faithful service in one grade for ten years"
- Major, 1st Artillery – 11 June 1836
- Brevet Lieutenant Colonel – October 1836 (to rank from 21 August 1836) for "distinguished service in affair at Fort Drane, Florida"
- Colonel (Florida Militia) – October 1836
- Lieutenant Colonel, 1st Artillery – 19 March 1842
