= Sidney Burbank =

United States Army general

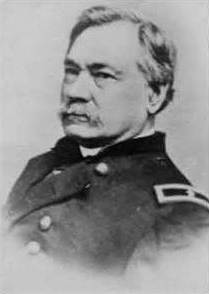
- Burbank in 1865
- Born: October 1807; Lexington, Massachusetts, U.S.
- Died: December 7, 1882 (aged 74–75); Newport, Kentucky, U.S.
- Burial place: Spring Grove Cemetery; Cincinnati, Ohio
- Military career
- Allegiance: United States of America; Union
- Branch: United States Army; Union Army
- Service years: 1829 – 1870
- Rank: Colonel; Brevet Brigadier General
- Commands: 13th Infantry Regiment; 2nd Infantry Regiment
- Conflicts: American Indian Wars; Black Hawk War; Second Seminole War; American Civil War; Battle of Chancellorsville; Gettysburg campaign; Battle of Gettysburg; Bristoe campaign; Mine Run campaign

Sidney Burbank (October 1807 – December 7, 1882) served as an officer in the regular army before and during the American Civil War. For a time he led a brigade in the Army of the Potomac.

== Pre-war service ==
Burbank was born in Lexington, Massachusetts in October 1807, the son of Lt. Col. Sullivan Burbank, an officer in the US Army since the War of 1812. Sidney Burbank attended the United States Military Academy at West Point, New York, graduating 17th in a class of 46 in 1829. Burbank was assigned to the 1st Infantry Regiment, serving in Indian wars, including the Seminole War. As a captain he established Fort Duncan near Eagle Pass, Texas in 1849.

== Early Civil War service ==
Burbank was promoted to lieutenant colonel of the 13th Infantry Regiment on May 14, 1861, and to colonel of the 2nd Infantry Regiment on September 16, 1862. Burbank succeeded to command of the 2nd Infantry following the death of Dixon Miles.

== Service with the Army of the Potomac ==
Colonel Burbank joined the Army of the Potomac in 1863. He served as a brigade commander in the second division of V Corps under Maj. Gen. George Sykes at the Battle of Chancellorsville. His brigade was composed of regiments of regular infantry. Burbank led the same brigade under Brig. Gen. Romeyn B. Ayres at the Battle of Gettysburg. Burbank's brigade lost heavily when it was attacked on the flank while deploying in the Wheatfield on July 2, 1863. The attack was executed by the brigade of Brig. Gen. William T. Wofford, and it cost Burbank's brigade 447 casualties. Afterwards, his regular brigade was combined with that of Col. Hannibal Day, serving under Burbank in the Bristoe Campaign and the Mine Run Campaign. He was nominated by Meade for Brigadier general but not promoted.

== Service in Kentucky ==
Burbank's health was poor, and in the winter of 1863-1864 his eyesight was failing. Burbank left the Army of the Potomac for less demanding assignments. (The regulars were made part of a brigade under Ayers in General Charles Griffin's first division V Corps.) Thereafter Burbank commanded a draft rendezvous in Columbus, Ohio and the headquarters of the 2nd Infantry in Kentucky until the end of the war, as well as the Newport Barracks in the Department of Kentucky.

On April 10, 1866, President Andrew Johnson nominated Burbank to the rank of brevet brigadier general, U.S.A. to rank from March 13, 1865, and the U.S. Senate confirmed the award on May 4, 1866 He rebuilt his regiment, as well as serving on boards and commissions, until he retired in May 1870. Burbank lived in Newport, Kentucky until he died on December 7, 1882, of an intestinal blockage. He is interred in Spring Grove Cemetery in Cincinnati.

Burbank's son, Capt. Sullivan Wayne Burbank, died of wounds received in the Battle of the Wilderness.

== See also ==
- List of Massachusetts generals in the American Civil War
- Massachusetts in the American Civil War
