= Harbor Defense Museum =

- Established: 1980; 46 years ago
- Location: Fort Hamilton, Bay Ridge, Brooklyn New York, United States
- Coordinates: 40°36′29.89″N 74°1′55.41″W
- Type: Military museum
- Visitors: 20,000/year (1995)
- Website: www.harbordefensemuseum.com

The Harbor Defense Museum, sometimes called The Caponier, is a 19th-century fort within the grounds of Fort Hamilton in the Bay Ridge section of Brooklyn, New York, United States. It is New York City's only military museum and one of only seventy military museums in the United States that is funded and operated by the Defense Department.

== Background and history ==
Caponiers, the technical name of the structure that now houses the museum, are outworks; in the case of Fort Hamilton its mission was to protect the main fortress from rear attacks. Originally a small fort within the larger fort, it now serves as the guardian of Fort Hamilton's history with memorabilia from a number of wars. Robert E. Lee served at Fort Hamilton in the 1840s, when there was only one Army. Because it was used as a warehouse after it was no longer needed for military purposes, it was better preserved than other parts of the fort. While the museum and fort were in danger of closing in the mid-1990s due to budget cuts, it was preserved due to an agreement between the fort and the United States Army Center of Military History and preservation efforts of the Fort Hamilton Historic Society.

The museum continues to serve an educational role in explaining the history of the evolution of New York Harbor. It underwent renovations in 2012-2013 and subsequently reopened. By mid-2025, the museum was again threatened with closure, amid budget reductions at the Army Center of Military History. This prompted objections from local residents and officials, including from U.S. representative Nicole Malliotakis.

== Collections ==
Fort Hamilton is the "second-oldest continuously garrisoned federal post in the nation", second only to West Point, and the fourth-oldest active military post. Although The Caponier was always prepared for battle, with a 24-pound cannon aimed at New York Harbor, the fort never experienced a battle. The museum houses an array of artifacts from New York's military history including American Revolutionary War relics, uniforms from various wars, old maps of the fort, the post's old switchboard, an exhibit on a secret tunnel that connected Fort Hamilton with another base a half-mile away, a Confederate mine and a piece of the net that protected New York Harbor from German U-boats in World War I. It is also the temporary home of a Bay Ridge time capsule that was unearthed prematurely due to construction.

== See also ==
- List of museums in New York City
