= Fort Drane =

19th c. fort in Florida

Fort Drane, also known as Fort Auld Lang Syne, was a fort built during the Second Seminole War in 1835. While the exact location of the fort is debated, generally speaking, it was located in what is now Marion County, Florida, possibly some 10 miles south of Micanopy. It was one of many fortifications built in Florida as a part of a strategy by the U.S. military to defeat the Seminole Indians.

== History ==
In 1835, General Duncan L. Clinch, overall commander of U.S. forces in Florida and a veteran of the First Seminole War, gathered together several hundred army regulars on his 3,000-acre sugar plantation, "Auld Lang Syne," located twenty miles north-west of Fort King.

Clinch ordered Captain Gustavus S. Drane of the Second Artillery to supervise the construction of the fort. The defensive works were located on the northwest corner of the plantation. It included a twelve foot high picket that enclosed the main buildings in an area 80 yards wide and 150 yards long. There was also a blockhouse at the east end of the yard and a single cannon was mounted. A second blockhouse was built on the northern side of the fort with two fieldpieces. After its completion, some 150 pioneers fled from their homesteads for fear of attacks by the Seminole and crowded into Fort Drane, most without food or adequate clothing. Aside from the influx of settlers, even the soldiers garrisoned at Fort Drane commented on the terrible conditions. Then Lieutenant Andrew A. Humphreys, who had been stationed elsewhere in Florida and so was acclimated to the climate, said that at Fort Drane he was "suffering from hunger, thirst and fatigue." The conditions were bad enough that Humphreys became ill and had to return north to convalesce.

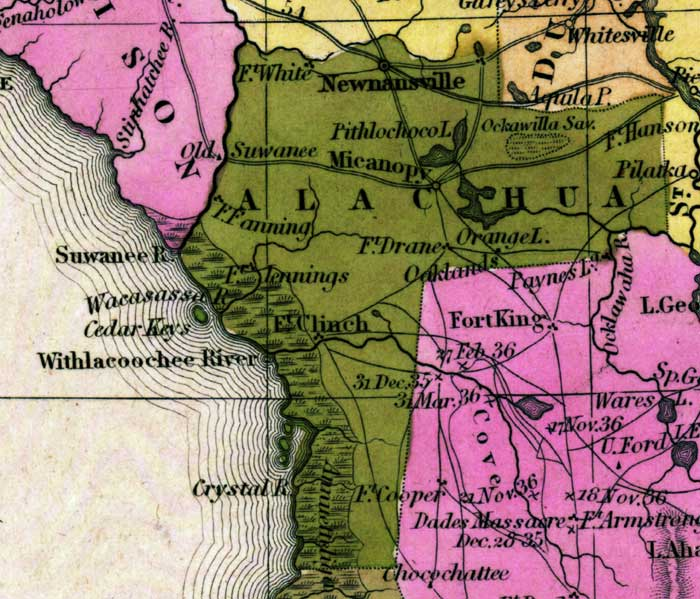
Map of military forts in Florida in 1839 during the Second Seminole War, including Fort Drane.

Despite the conditions at the fort, it became the main base of operations for the U.S. army during the spring and early summer of 1836. With the intention of marching a column through enemy territory and ending the war, Clinch began gathering troops at Fort Drane. He was preparing to attack the Seminole stronghold at the Cove of the Withlacoochee.

Sometime around June 1836, a squad of dragoons were dispatched from the fort after a group of persons were observed nearby. The group proved to be a number Seminole Maroons, one of which who was an escaped slave from Clinch plantation. This led to a further investigation and it was alleged that several of slaves on the plantation were planning on escaping and joining with the Seminole. A rifle was also discovered under one of the floors. This resulted in the male slaves being secured and put under guard.

The fort was abandoned by January 1837. Shortly after, it was burned down along with the Aud Lang Syne plantation house. The Seminole who burned the buildings down ended up camping at the site for a brief period afterward.

Remnants of the fort, along with any potential human remains on the site, were allegedly exhumed and otherwise removed from the site by the Mid-Florida Mining company in the early 1990s.

Both General Scott and General Gaines were stationed At Fort Drane. Some of the other notable people who were garrisoned or else passed through the fort included; Zachary Taylor, Ichabod Crane, and Benjamin Kendrick Pierce.
