= Old Fort Pierce Park =

United States historic site in Florida

- Fort Pierce Site
- U.S. National Register of Historic Places
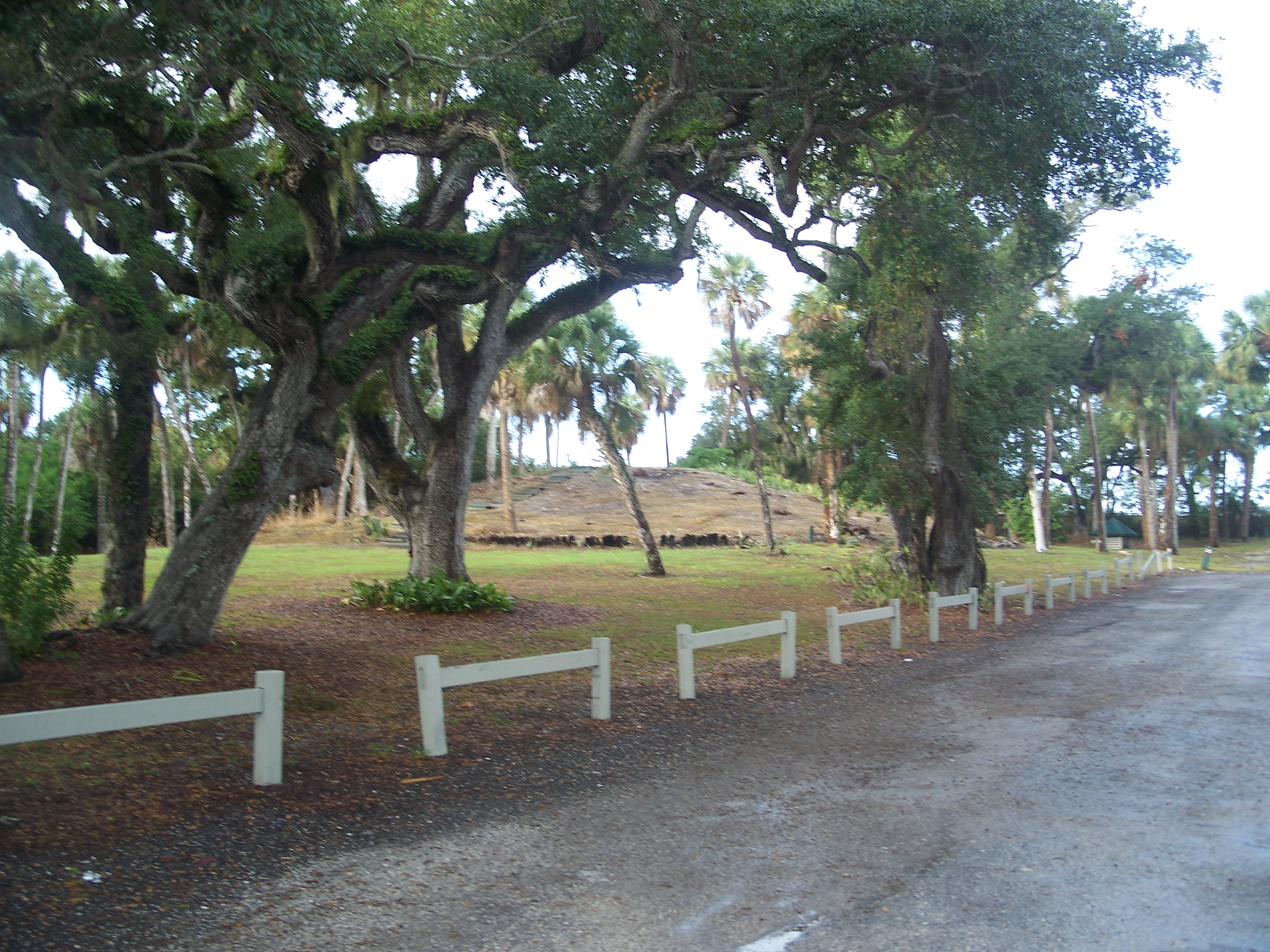
- Location: S. Indian River Drive (CR 707); Fort Pierce, Florida 34950
- Coordinates: 27°26′11″N 80°19′14″W
- Built: 1838
- NRHP reference No.: 74002181
- Added to NRHP: January 11, 1974

Old Fort Pierce Park is the site of Fort Pierce, a military installation constructed by the U.S. Army in Florida with the purpose of being a main supply depot for the army during the Second Seminole War. The modern town of Fort Pierce derives its name from this installation.

Fort Pierce, named for its first commander Benjamin Kendrick Pierce, was built in 1838 as a defensive position in the Second Seminole War. During the war, then second-lieutenant William Tecumseh Sherman was stationed at Fort Pierce. It was abandoned in 1842 at the end of the war and burned down the following year.

Today, the site is a park along the Indian River. The park is also the site of an ancient burial mound of the Ais Indian tribe which extended from Cape Canaveral to the Saint Lucie inlet.

This site once had a natural spring which made it a popular location for the Ais Indians and later for Spanish sailors who would stop here occasionally to refill their water jars before making the transatlantic crossing back to Spain. (1500–1750) It is not uncommon to find Spanish relics mixed with Indian potsherds in the river at that location.
