= Old Stone Barracks =

- U.S. National Register of Historic Places
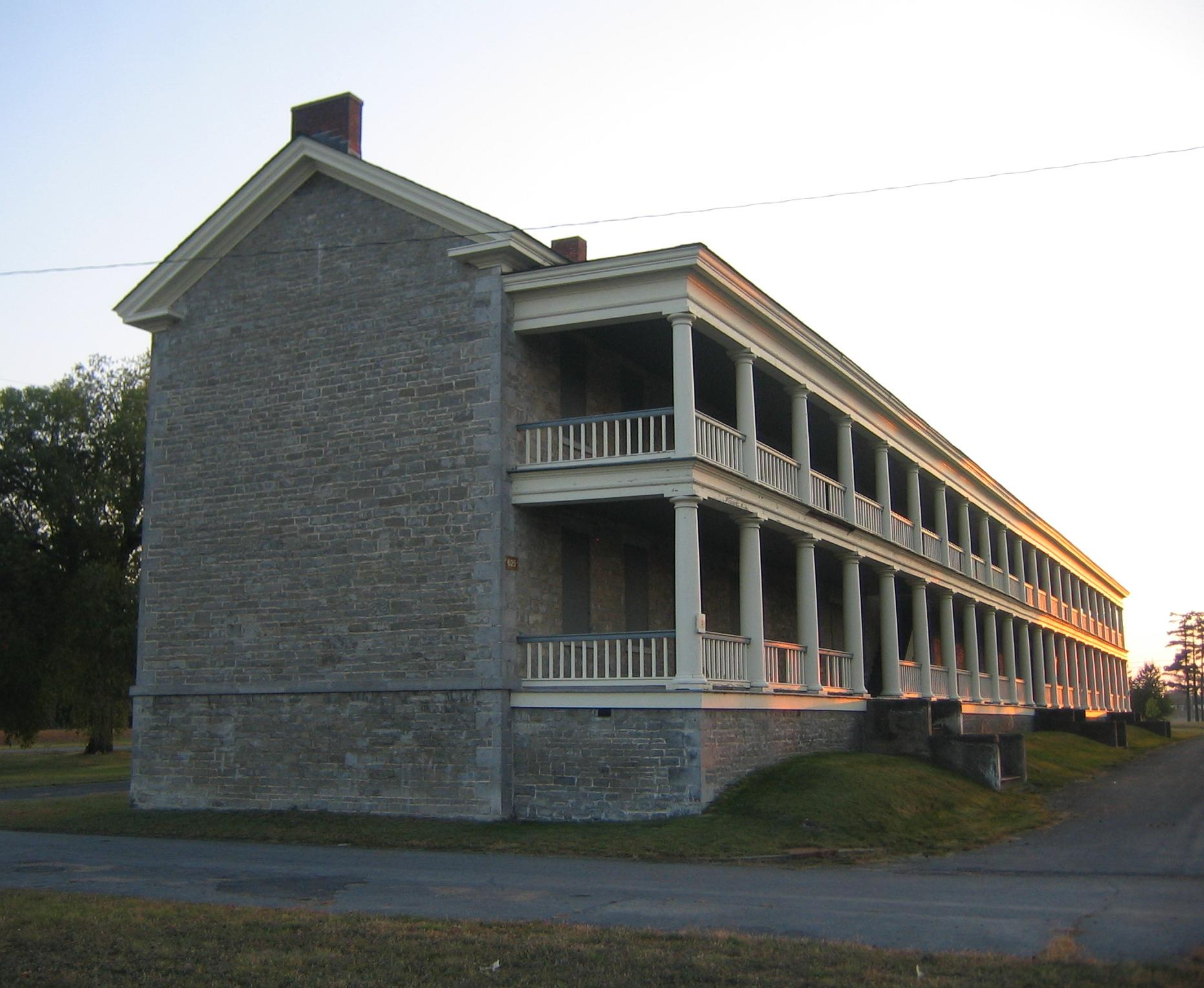
- Sunset looking west at the 1838 "Old Stone Barracks" at Plattsburgh, New York. Photographed September 25, 2008

- Location within New York Location within the United States
- Location: Plattsburgh, New York
- Coordinates: 44°40′51″N 73°26′42″W
- Built: 1838
- NRHP reference No.: 71000533
- Added to NRHP: February 18, 1971

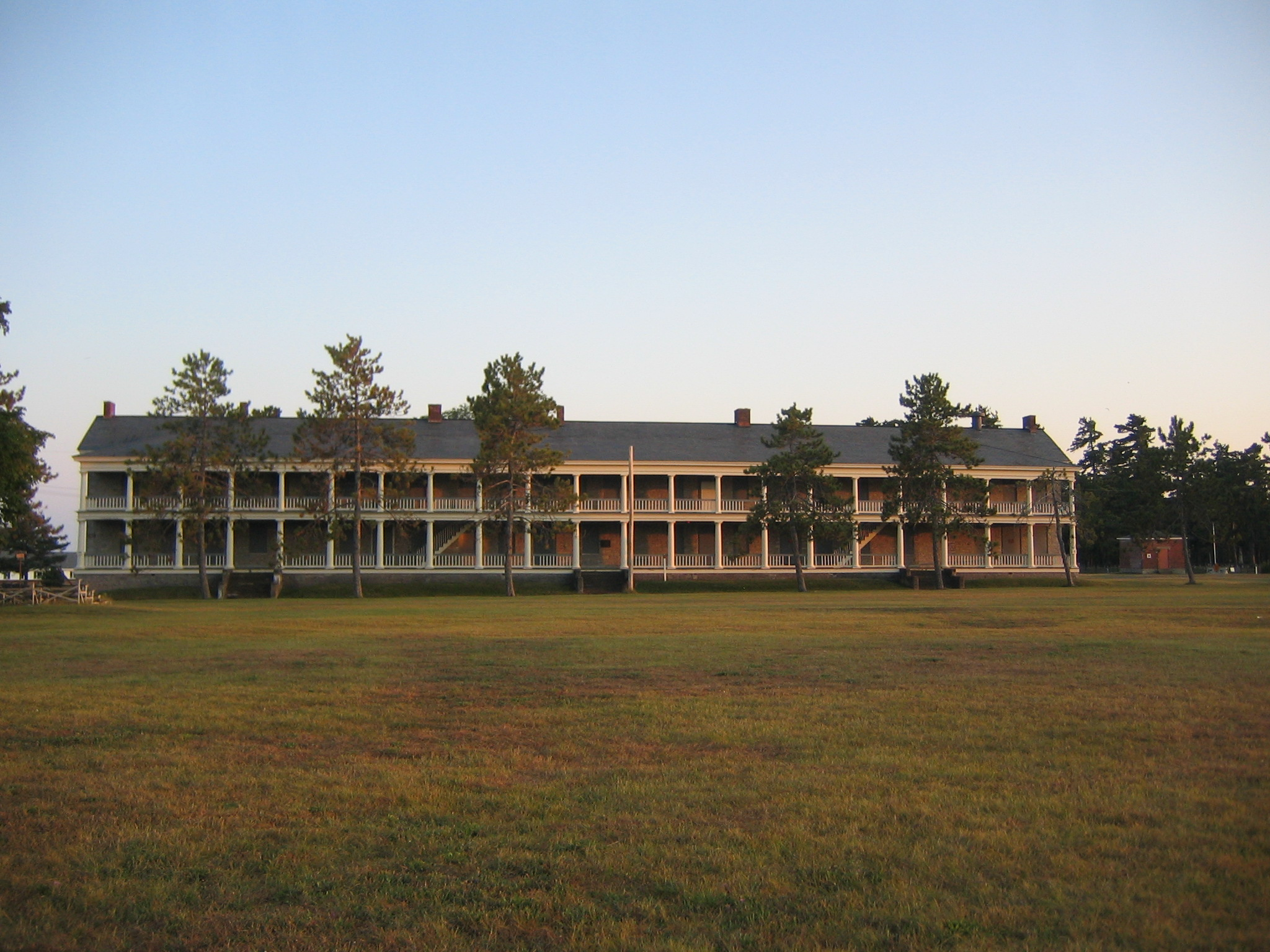
The Barracks as viewed from the parade ground. The surviving brick powder magazine from the same era and the "old post cemetery" beyond can be seen just to the right.

The "Old Stone Barracks" is the last remaining structure of a proposed quadrangle of early U.S. Army barracks built at Plattsburgh, New York in 1838. Of the four main buildings initially planned for the Plattsburgh post, only two were ever constructed, an officer's barracks and an enlisted barracks which formed an "L" shape. The buildings were utilized by the Army for nearly a century. The officer's quarters, in which Lt. Ulysses S. Grant once stayed, was torn down by the U.S. Air Force during the winter of 1963. The remaining building, the 200-foot (61 m) long, two-story "Old Stone Barracks", remained mostly empty after the early 1960s and was added to the National Register of Historic Places in 1971. In December 2010 the Barracks and more than 7 acres of property was offered to a Canadian real estate developer for $35,000 with the intention of building an apartment complex on the historic site. At the time, the Barracks property was appraised at over $775,000 and the sale sparked public outcry for its preservation. In 2014, the building was again sold to current owners Terry Schmaltz and Mary Theresa Pearl who redeveloped it as the home of the "Valcour Brewing Company." The new craft brewery opened in 2016.

== History ==
In the decades following the decisive British defeat at the Battle of Plattsburgh and the close of the War of 1812, the United States Military still remained suspicious and wary of British Canada. Relations with England were not cordial following the war and the establishment of a permanent Army Post for a garrison at Plattsburgh, along the strategically important Lake Champlain corridor, which for centuries had been a route for invasion, seemed an obvious choice. Although troops had been stationed there from roughly 1812 to 1825, no permanent military installation had been constructed with the men often being housed in dilapidated and inadequate log structures left over from the War. This was especially apparent in view of the usually harsh North Country winters. In an October, 1838 letter to the Commanding General of the United States Army, Major General Alexander Macomb, who had commanded at Plattsburgh during the 1814 Battle, Brigadier General Abraham Eustis outlined the poor condition of the soldier's quarters there:

I take the liberty of calling to your attention the deficiency of Quarters for the troops at this station. You are already informed that there is scarcely a vestige of the old barracks remaining and that in consequence I have directed the six old storehouses on the public ground to be repaired and fitted for temporary barracks ...

The establishment of a permanent Plattsburgh Barracks was also partly spurred on by the military buildup associated with the beginning of the 2nd Seminole War in 1835. The outbreak of the War had drawn nearly a quarter of the total strength of the Army to the War zone in Florida. This fact had blatantly demonstrated to lawmakers and military leaders alike that the standing peacetime strength of the United States Army was far too small to meet the nation's needs. In 1838, Congress raised the standing strength of the Army to 12,539 men and the need for housing for them ballooned overnight.

The innovative permanent Army post planned for Plattsburgh was initially to be four stone barracks structures positioned in a quadrangle around a 200-foot (61 m) square parade ground and surrounded by a wooden palisade with a western facing gate. Construction began late in 1838 on a rise overlooking the lake about a mile outside of the village. The site selected for the post stood just to the south of the three remaining earthwork fortifications left over from the 1814 siege, Fort Brown, Fort Moreau, and Fort Scott. These forts, which had been carefully laid out prior to the Battle, had been constructed under the direction of Major Joseph Totten, an expert in military and tactical engineering of the period. Together with two smaller redoubts which had been erected later, Fort Tompkins and Fort Gaines, the Plattsburgh fortifications formed a pentagon of interlocking cannon fire which could have protected the barracks from any hostile forces if the need arose.

By August, 1839, during the command of Benjamin Kendrick Pierce, stonework had commenced and the exterior walls of both the officer's and enlisted men's barracks had been erected. The main barracks buildings were built of native limestone which was quarried nearby and transported to the site. The water filled quarry where the limestone was excavated is still visible today. After this initial burst of progress, however, the site experienced several periods of stagnant and halted construction due in part to bureaucratic red tape from Washington. After numerous letters and solicitations were written to the Secretary of War by concerned Plattsburgh citizens, the Assistant Quartermaster General of the Army, Captain R. E. Clary was dispatched to oversee the construction project in September, 1841. Under Clary's supervision by September of the following year, it was reported to the Quartermaster General that the exterior work of the "company quarters" had been completed with the exception of the stone steps, portico floors, stairs leading to the upper level, and adjustment of the columns. Although reports claimed the buildings were nearing completion, the companies at Plattsburgh were still quartered in the old temporary wooden barracks through the winter of 1842–43 as the appropriation made for completing the work had been nearly exhausted. It would be nearly another year before two of the four buildings were ultimately finished and could be occupied in October, 1843.

When finally completed, the enlisted men's barracks, which would later be called simply the "Old Stone Barracks," was finished with a very attractive and distinctive two story tuscan columned and corniced portico which runs the entire 200-foot (61 m) length of the building and was covered with a skillion roof. Initially four external staircases along this portico allowed the only access to the second floor. One stairway for each of the four large second floor rooms which served as each Company's living quarters. The smaller and slightly more elaborate neighboring officer's barracks was also finished with a similar two story portico although on the opposite side of the structure facing Lake Champlain where officers could enjoy the panoramic view and breeze of Plattsburgh Bay. Future 18th President of the United States Ulysses S. Grant occupied quarters in the officer's barracks while stationed at Plattsburgh as a young Lieutenant sometime between his graduation from West Point in 1843 and prior to serving in the Mexican War in 1846.

The enlisted barracks originally contained 18 rooms, several of which on the first floor were utilized as a post hospital, dispensary, Company office, Sergeant's room, Company kitchen, and mess hall. Four small storm-sheds and the hospital bathroom also extended off the first floor on the backside of the building. Many of the rooms were heated by individual coal stoves as well, providing a much appreciated measure of luxury for the soldiers during the winter months. Initially the western wall of the barracks was built of wood which would have allowed for an addition to be added to the structure later if the Army deemed it necessary. This never came to pass, however, and the temporary wooden wall was eventually finished in stone to match the rest of the facade. Within short order a host of smaller support buildings were erected at the post as well including a brick powder magazine, post headquarters, storehouse, carpenter's shop, icehouse, guardhouse with an area for holding prisoners, and two deep wells for drinking water.

The military presence in the Champlain Valley was further augmented just four years after the completion of the new Army post at Plattsburgh when construction was begun in 1844 on Fort Montgomery at nearby Rouses Point, a massive masonry fortification mounting 125 guns which would guard the northernmost point of Lake Champlain. Fort Montgomery, by design, was never permanently garrisoned and it was assumed that if the need arose, troops from Plattsburgh could quickly be marched there to man the fortification. In May 1850, Major Thomas J. Jackson, who would later be forever immortalized with the nickname "Stonewall," attended a court martial at Plattsburgh Barracks. While there he wrote his sister Laura Ann describing his surroundings:

Plattsburg Barracks N.Y.

May 10th 1850

My Dear Sister,

You observe that I am now on the border of Canada, it is for the purpose of trying some prisoners. My health is still improving and in a short time I expect to return home to Fort Hamilton. In coming to this place I have passed some charming scenery. This place is on the Western bank of Lake Champlain. I should like very much to visit Montreal and Quebec before returning South, but want of time and money will prevent it. On my way here I saw the old Fort Ticonderoga and Crown Point. And in front of this Garrison, was fought the great Naval action of the late war.

Remember me kindly to Mr. A and Family.

Your brother Thomas"

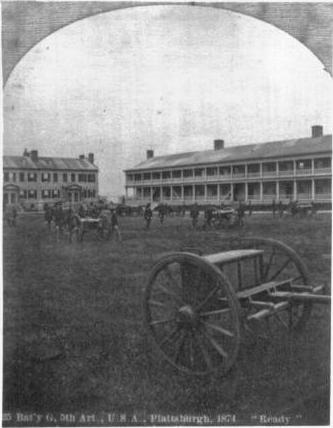
An 1874 stereoview photo card depicting Battery G of the 5th U.S. Artillery drilling on the parade ground at Plattsburgh Barracks. Note the adjacent officer's quarters to the left which was demolished in 1964.

Various Infantry and Artillery units were stationed at Plattsburgh Barracks in spurts throughout the latter half of the 19th century. Beginning in the early 1890s, a sprawling expansion program greatly enlarged the Army Post at Plattsburgh to the north with the construction of 3 much larger and more modern barracks, relegating the 1840 era structures to a much more secondary role. All of the old and long abandoned defensive fortifications still present, with the exception of Fort Brown, were leveled to form a mammoth 40-acre (160,000 m^{2}) parade ground known as the "U.S. Oval." In 1892 during the removal of Fort Moreau, which had been the central and largest of the three American forts during the Battle of Plattsburgh, numerous human remains, as many as 25 individuals, were unearthed which had been hurriedly buried either during or immediately following the siege. A similar situation occurred when Fort Scott was leveled, with some thirty or more skeletons being removed from that site as well. Cannonballs and other 1814 artifacts that were also recovered were purportedly sent by the Army to the Smithsonian Institution in Washington, D.C. All of the recovered skeletons were buried with full military honors in the nearby "old post cemetery" in a mass grave marked by a large monument dedicated to unknown dead of the War of 1812.

It was also during this period that the 21st Infantry, known as the "President's Own," was stationed at Plattsburgh. Their nickname was bestowed upon them during their years at Plattsburgh by President William Mckinley, who when frequently summering nearby at the luxurious Hotel Champlain, would often visit the Post to review the troops and attend performances by the unit's band. From their barracks here, the unit would be dispatched to see action in the Spanish–American War in 1898, as well as the Philippine–American War the following year. Following its return from duty in Cuba, the 15th Infantry was stationed here from 1899 to 1902 prior to its deployment to China and the Philippines.

In 1899, the original interiors of the "Old Stone Barracks" were gutted and modernized to serve as a barracks for the Post Band which it remained until 1906. During the updating of the structure, two of the external staircases on the front portico were removed and several internal stairways were constructed. It is believed that during this period, the original skillion or "shed" style roof was replaced over the portico with the hip roof we see today. Also, off the backside of the building where the four storm-sheds and hospital bathroom were originally located, several small single and two story porches were built to allow more convenient access to rooms from that side.

=== 20th century ===
The barracks served in a variety of capacities throughout the first half of the 20th century. During World War I and the years immediately preceding it, the building served as part of the Civilian Military Training Camp at Plattsburgh, the brainchild of General Leonard Wood and forerunner of today's ROTC program.

In 1939, on the eve of World War II, Plattsburgh Barracks hosted the massive 1st United States Army maneuvers, a huge pre-War training operation involving aircraft, tanks, and roughly 20,000 soldiers.

The barracks was last used as offices and then apartments for Air Force personnel at Plattsburgh Air Force Base in the late 1950s. Following the demolition of the adjoining officer's quarters in 1964, the surviving "Old Stone Barracks" mostly remained dormant. Around this time the small 1899 era porch additions on the rear of the barracks were removed and the entire building was boarded up as a historical structure. The building was added to the National Register of Historic Places in 1971. With the impending closure of the base in 1995, one of the last official acts of the Air Force concerning the building was to perform asbestos and lead paint abatement, removing most of the remaining interior down to the studs, and replacing the barracks's slate roof.

== 21st century ==
The only structures which remain of the original 1840 era Army post are the barracks, its adjacent brick powder magazine, and the nearby "old post cemetery". The original post parade ground is also still present. These structures represent one of the last remaining examples of the first generation of permanent U.S. Army barracks in existence in the United States.

The "Old Stone Barracks" itself changed little following the departure of the Air Force in 1995, remaining boarded up and closed to the public for another 20 years. The building was often the target of vandalism and frequent break-ins, due in part to the many ghost stories which circulated on the internet concerning the building and its purported (and false) use as a "field hospital" during the Battle of Plattsburgh (24 years before the Barracks was even built). Floodlights were added to illuminate the front and rear of the barracks at night, decreasing the number of forced entries into the structure.

In 2007, a section of paved road which ran beside the barracks and followed the route of the original dirt road into the post compound through the palisade gate was removed by the City of Plattsburgh. In December 2010, it became public knowledge that the Old Stone Barracks and over 7 acres of surrounding property had been offered to Bernard Schneider, a Canadian real estate developer, for $35,000. At the time, the property was appraised at over $775,000. News of the pending sale immediately sparked a public outcry and spurred a Facebook campaign entitled "Save the Old Stone Barracks." Details of the proposed development included the construction of a large apartment complex on the historic property. Bowing to public pressure and involvement by the New York State Office of Historic Preservation, the project stalled and the Barracks was again offered for sale.

In late 2014, the Old Stone Barracks was purchased by Terry Schmaltz and his wife Mary Theresa Pearl with plans to restore and refurbish the historic building as the new home of the "Valcour Brewing Company," a craft brewery. Initial plans for the 1.5-million-dollar project call for a tasting room, meeting space, restaurant, and inn.
