= Casemate Fort, Whiting Quadrangle =

- U.S. National Register of Historic Places
- New York State Register of Historic Places
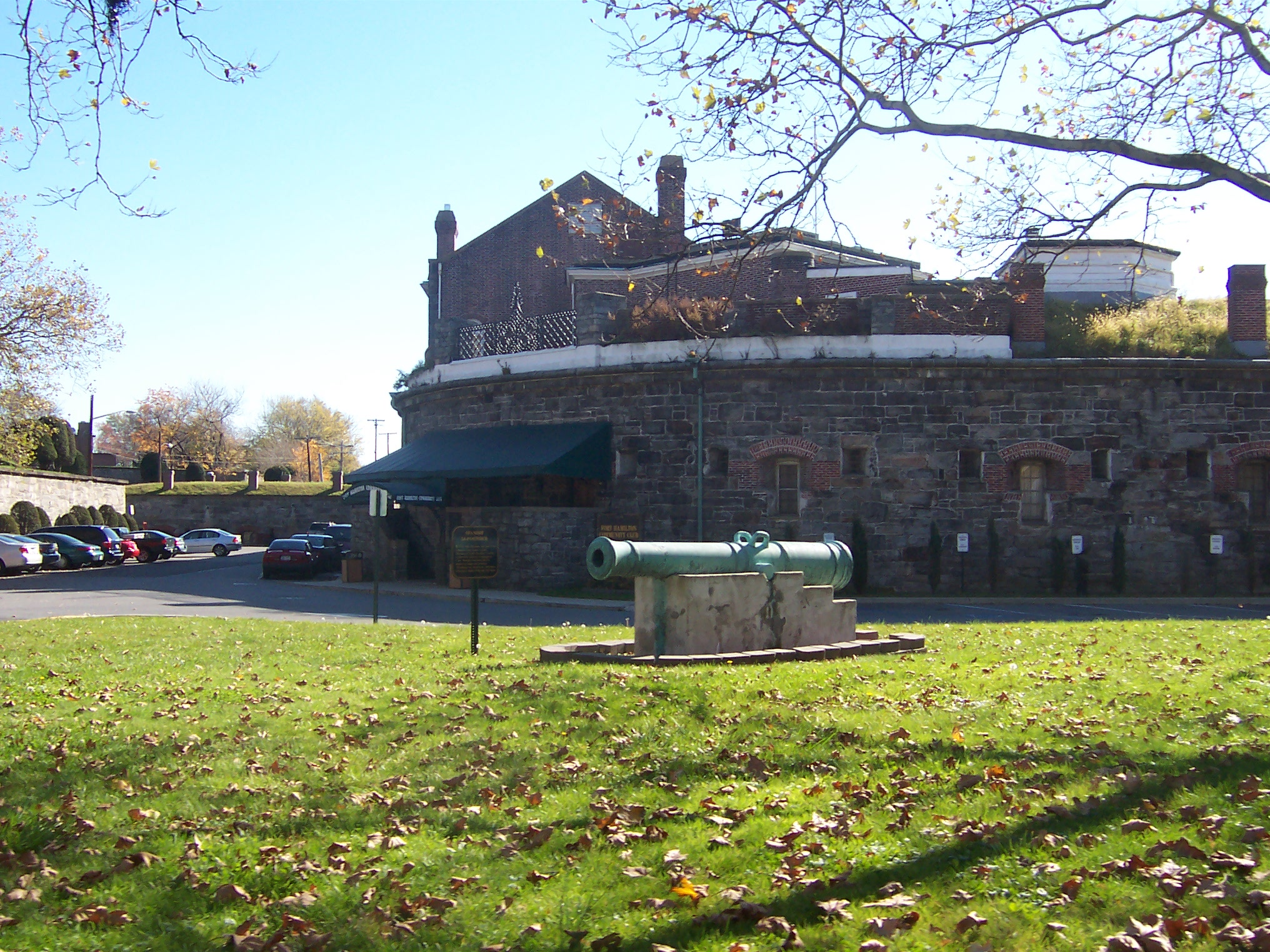
- Casemate Fort, November 2006

- Location within New York City Location within New York Location within the United States
- Location: Fort Hamilton, off NY 27, New York, New York
- Coordinates: 40°36′31″N 74°1′58″W
- Area: 2 acres (0.81 ha)
- Built: 1825
- NRHP reference No.: 74001249
- NYSRHP No.: 04701.008919

Significant dates
- Added to NRHP: August 7, 1974
- Designated NYSRHP: June 23, 1980

Casemate Fort, Whiting Quadrangle, also known as "Old Casemate," Officers Club Bldg. #207, Sentry Booth #220, and Fort Hamilton Community Club, is a historic building located in Fort Hamilton, Brooklyn, New York, New York. The old fort was designed in 1819 and built between 1825 and 1836. It is a brick and stone C-shaped structure with all walls approximately three feet thick. The building and adjoining stone walls form a type of fortification known as a "walled enceinte".

It was listed on the National Register of Historic Places in 1974.

== See also ==
- National Register of Historic Places listings in Brooklyn
