= Magdelaine Laframboise =

Northwest Territory fur trader and pioneer (1780–1846)

Magdelaine La Framboise
- Artist's depiction from descriptions
- Born: February 1780; Fort St. Joseph, Michigan
- Died: April 4, 1846; Mackinac Island
- Occupation: Fur trader
- Spouse: Joseph La Framboise
- Children: Josette and Joseph La Framboise

Magdelaine La Framboise (1780–1846), born Marguerite-Magdelaine Marcot, (Note: Her first name is sometimes spelled Madeline, Madeleine, etc.) was one of the most successful fur traders in the Northwest Territory of the United States, in the area of present-day western Michigan. Of mixed Odawa and French descent, she was fluent in the Odawa, French, English and Ojibwe languages of the region, and partnered with her husband. After he was fatally stabbed in the fall of 1806 by a member of the Potawatomi tribe, she successfully managed her fur trade business for more than a decade, even against the competition of John Jacob Astor. After retiring from the trade, she built a fine home on Mackinac Island.

La Framboise founded a school on Mackinac Island for Native American children. She also supported a Sunday school and other activities at the Catholic Sainte Anne Church. She donated land for a new site for the church, and was honored by being buried beneath its altar. As one of the most prominent early businesswomen of the new state, in 1984 she was elected posthumously to the recently established Michigan Women's Hall of Fame.

== Early life ==
She was born Marguerite-Magdelaine Marcot in February 1781 at Fort St. Joseph, near present-day Niles, Michigan. She was the youngest of seven mixed-race children of Jean Baptiste Marcot (1720–1783), a French factor or chief agent for the Northwest Fur Company, and his Odawa wife, Marie Nekesh (c. 1740 – c. 1790), also known as Marianne or Marie Amighissen. Her maternal grandfather was Chief Kewinoquot of the Odawa. The children's father, Jean Baptiste Marcot, was killed in 1783 by Indians at the portage between the Fox and Wisconsin rivers.

Therese (b. 1775) and Magdelaine, the two youngest children, were baptized as Roman Catholic a few years later on August 1, 1786, on Mackinac Island. They were raised in their mother's culture and learned several languages. Their father had sent the family's children to Montreal to be educated in French-language schools, but their widowed mother did not have the financial resources to do that when the girls came of age. She moved to Mackinac with Magdelaine and her sisters after the British abandoned Fort St. Joseph, ceding the area to the new nation of the independent United States in the aftermath of the American Revolutionary War.

For a time Marie lived with her youngest children in a village of the Lac Courtes Oreilles, located at the mouth of the Grand River. (This Ojibwe-speaking tribe has been federally recognized since 1854.) This area was later developed by European Americans as Grand Haven, Michigan. Therese and Magdelaine both became fluent in four languages: Ottawa, French, English, and Chippewa (also known as Ojibwe).

In later years, Magdelaine's older sisters Therese and Catherine Marcot married and also became active in the fur trade; they took over from their husbands, George Schindler and Jean Baptiste Cadotte, respectively. Although neither became as well-known as Magdelaine, they were upwardly mobile, making good lives for themselves and their descendants. The descendants of Therese Schindler became "most prominent in Wisconsin medical and social circles." The women used their family ties among the Odawa and knowledge about the varieties of regional Native American tribes and culture to build and maintain their businesses. Like Magdelaine in later years, Therese Schindler was based mostly in Mackinac Island.

== Marriage and family ==
Marcotte married Joseph La Framboise (1765–1806) in 1794. On September 24, 1795, they had their first child, a daughter, Josette La Framboise (1795–1820), then a son Joseph La Framboise (March 1805-1856). Although the couple were married by Odawa custom (known as "the custom of the country"), they had their marriage solemnized on July 11, 1804, by a Catholic missionary at Michilimackinac (Mackinac Island). (Magdelaine/Madeline's surname has also been recorded as Laframboise, and she became known as Mme. La Framboise.)

== Fur trading ==
Magdelaine La Framboise and her husband Joseph developed a fur trade in the Grand River Valley of west Michigan, where they established many trading posts. Every fall they would take their trade goods for business with the Odawa from Mackinac Island down to the Grand River area. They built another post at what has developed as Fallasburg, Michigan. This was the first permanent mercantile building in the west Michigan area. Every spring they returned to Mackinac Island with the furs they had acquired through the season's trading.

== On her own ==
After Joseph La Framboise was murdered in 1806, Magdelaine La Framboise took over their fur trade. She continued to manage several trading posts, and expanded her business throughout the western and northern portions of Michigan's lower peninsula. She also raised their two children, sending both Josette and Joseph to Montreal for education in French schools.

Fur trading could be a lucrative business: an experienced fur trader earned about $1000 per year (which was a large sum at the time). La Framboise was highly successful, earning $5000 to $10,000 per year.

"La Framboise, the half-Ottawa wife of a murdered French trapper, owned a string of trading posts in the Grand River Valley. Reputed to be no ordinary woman — probably for succeeding in an exclusively male trade in the "pays d'en haut" or savage country."

In the early 1800s Mackinac had a permanent population of about 250. Although it was part of the United States and a territory, most of the residents were still of French and Métis ancestry, and French was the predominant language. In the summer trading season, the population could reach 4,000, attracting agents and Native Americans from the interior. La Framboise was not alone as a woman fur trader. In 1805 her sister Therese moved with her daughter Marianne to Mackinac full-time after her marriage to trader George Schindler, who was well-respected. They lived nearby and Therese worked with her husband in the trade.

In addition, both women had become friendly with Elizabeth (Bertrand) Mitchell (c. 1760–1827) and her husband. She was the mixed-race wife of the Scots physician David Mitchell (c. 1750–1832). He had served since 1774 with the British at Michilimackinac, where the couple married. When the 8th Foot regiment departed in 1780 during the American Revolutionary War, Mitchell chose to resign and stay on Mackinac Island with his wife and children.

He had begun fur trading and by 1790 built quite a business with his wife's help and her Odawa family connections. They were among the elite traders; they sent their sons to Montreal for their education and their daughters to Europe. Their lives were quite interrupted by the War of 1812, during which Mitchell rejoined the British Army. Afterward, under pressure by Americans against British nationals trading in the United States, the family moved across the border to Drummond Island. Mitchell lived there with three of their sons, and Elizabeth was with him temporarily. About 1816, she returned to the US with their son William to manage their holdings on Mackinac. They had retail stores at both places and traveled to see each other.

Because La Framboise spoke several regional Native American languages, in addition to French and English, and had a strong network among the Native Americans, she continued to be successful, even in competition with John Jacob Astor's American Fur Company monopoly. About 1818 she became an affiliate of his, and finally sold out in 1822 to his American Fur Company. Rix Robinson, a Michigan pioneer, purchased her business. La Framboise, then 41 years old and a very wealthy woman, retired to a stately home on Mackinac Island. Her son-in-law Captain Benjamin Pierce, commandant of Fort Mackinac, had overseen its construction.

== Life on Mackinac Island ==
House of Magdelaine La Framboise, Mackinac Island

After her retirement from fur trading, La Framboise taught herself to read and write in both French and English. She supported the first Catholic school for Native American children on Mackinac Island, starting it in her home. Continuing her devotion to Ste. Anne's Church there, she taught catechism to the parish's children. She was influential in keeping the congregation together in the several years when it did not have a regular priest. Both her activism with the church and work for the education of children secured her a respected place in Mackinac society.

The parish register lists Mme. Laframboise as godmother for many baptisms and witness at many marriages. When the church leaders decided to move the church from its original location, La Framboise donated the property next to her home as the site for the building. Ste. Anne's Church still stands there today. In exchange for her gift of land, La Framboise asked to be buried beneath the altar of Ste. Anne's at her death.

On April 2, 1816 her daughter Josette La Framboise, known as Josephine, married Benjamin Kendrick Pierce (1790–1850), American commandant of Fort Mackinac. When they later lived in Washington, DC, she was consulted by officials on Indian affairs. Benjamin was the brother of Franklin Pierce, who was elected in 1852 as U.S. President. Pierce and Josette had two children, Josette Harriet Pierce (also known as Harriet Josephine Pierce), born in 1818, and Benjamin Langdon Pierce, born in 1820. Josette La Framboise Pierce died on November 24, 1820. Their son Benjamin Langdon Pierce died in infancy. Magdelaine La Framboise took over the care of her granddaughter dit Harriet after her daughter's death.

Magdelaine's son Joseph La Framboise, Jr. became a fur trader and merchant like his parents. He lived along the Minnesota River Valley and also in Montreal, where his mother traveled to visit him. He married Magdeleine "Sleepy Eyes" Sisseton around 1827, a member of the Sioux tribe. They had one son, Francis La Framboise.

After his wife Magdeleine died, Joseph married again in 1845 in Nicollet County, Minnesota, to Jane Dickson, daughter of fur trader William Dickson. She was believed to be 1/4 or half-Sioux through her mother. They also had children. Joseph La Framboise died there in November 9, 1856, Little Rock Creek, Ridgely Township.

During the 1830s and 1840s, La Framboise continued to host many prominent visitors to Mackinac Island, including French writer Alexis de Tocqueville, who explored the United States and wrote about it, and Margaret Fuller, an "American woman of letters" from Massachusetts. Fuller memorialized her trip in a non-fiction book entitled Summer on the Lakes, in which she referred to meeting Laframboise, writing:

The house where we lived belonged to the widow of a French trader, an Indian by birth, and wearing the dress of her country. She spoke French fluently, and was very ladylike in her manners. She is a great character among them. They were all the time coming to pay her homage, or to get her aid and advice; for she is, I am told, a shrewd woman of business.

"Juliette Augusta Kinzie described La Framboise as "a woman of a vast deal of energy and enterprise – of a tall and commanding figure, and most dignified deportment."

== Death and legacy ==
La Framboise died on April 4, 1846. Father Henri Van Renterghen of Ste. Anne's honored the request of Mme. La Framboise and had her interred beneath the altar of the church. In the 1960s, Ste. Anne's was renovated and a basement activity center was added. The remains of La Framboise, as well as those of her daughter Josephin Pierce and her infant daughter Josette, who had been buried with her, were relocated and interred in Ste. Anne's churchyard. A historic marker there also recognized La Framboise and her contributions.

In the early 21st century, Ste. Anne's Church constructed a crypt in the church for interment and prayer. It honored La Framboise by reinterring her and her family's remains in the crypt on July 26, 2013. Some of her descendants attended the ceremony.

The mansion of La Framboise still stands next door to the church. It has been acquired, renovated and adapted for use as the Harbour View Inn.
