= Fort Hamilton =

U.S. Army installation in Brooklyn, New York

- Part of Harbor Defenses of Southern New York
- New York City borough of Brooklyn, New York
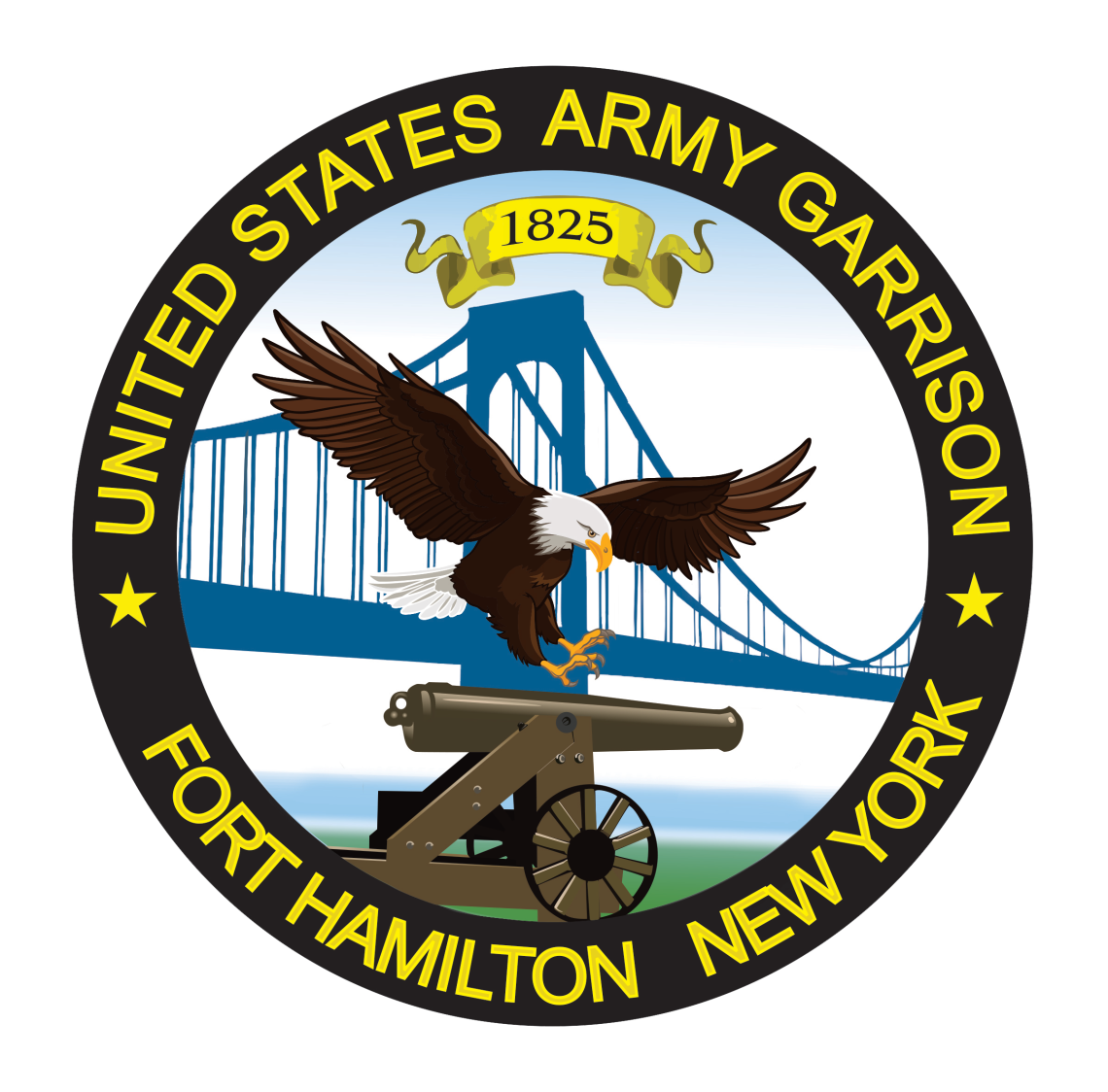
- Fort Hamilton Seal

Site information
- Controlled by: United States Army
- Open to the public: partly
- Condition: partly demolished, remainder occupied

Location
- Location within New York City Location within New York Location within the United States
- Coordinates: 40°36′22″N 74°01′51″W

Site history
- Built: 1825–1831
- Built by: Simon Bernard
- In use: 1825–present

Garrison information
- Current commander: COL Brian A. Jacobs
- Past commanders: Major Benjamin Kendrick Pierce; Captain Abner Doubleday; Captain Robert E. Lee (post engineer)
- Garrison: Brooklyn, New York

Fort Hamilton is a United States Army installation in the southwestern corner of the New York City borough of Brooklyn, surrounded by the communities of Bay Ridge and Dyker Heights. It is one of several posts that are part of the region which is headquartered by the Military District of Washington. Its mission is to provide the New York metropolitan area with military installation support for the Army National Guard and the United States Army Reserve. The original fort was completed in 1831, with major additions made in the 1870s and 1900s. About half of the original fort defenses remains.

== History ==
On July 4, 1776, a small American battery (the Narrows Fort) on the site of Fort Hamilton (the east side of the Narrows) fired at HMS Asia, which was part of a British fleet convoying troops to fight in the New York and New Jersey campaign. Asia suffered minor damage, but such attacks on the fleet were militarily of no value, and the British soon occupied New York City after their victory at the Battle of Long Island. This event marked one of the earliest uses of the site for military purposes.

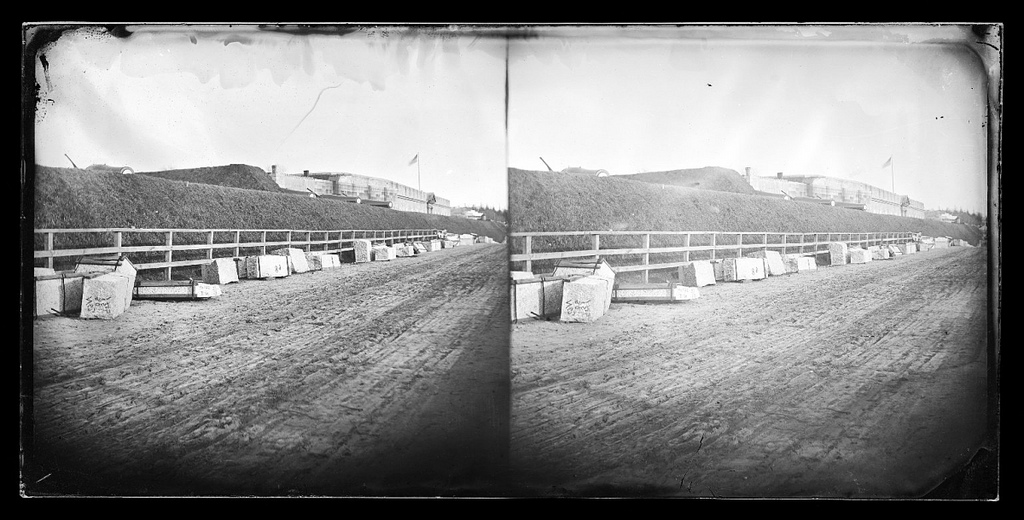
Shore at Fort Hamilton, Brooklyn, c. 1872–1887

The War of 1812 underscored the importance of coastal defense (in particular the British burning of Washington) and helped to promote a new round of fort building. The new forts, including Fort Hamilton, were eventually termed the third system of US seacoast forts. The cornerstone for Fort Hamilton was set in place by its designer, Simon Bernard, on June 11, 1825. Bernard was previously a French military engineer under Napoleon, who had joined the US Army after Napoleon's defeat in 1815. Six years and a half million dollars later, the fort was ready to receive its garrison, initially Battery F of the 4th US Artillery.

Fort Hamilton (now the Casemate Fort, Whiting Quadrangle) was designed primarily as a landward defense for Fort Lafayette, although it had a sea-facing front as well. Fort Lafayette was offshore on Hendricks Reef, and was demolished in the 1960s to make room for the eastern tower of the Verrazzano–Narrows Bridge. Fort Hamilton was in the shape of a trapezoid, with the wide side facing the Narrows and the narrow side facing inland. It had two tiers of cannon all around: a casemated tier inside the fort and a barbette tier on the roof. Loopholes for muskets were provided on the three landward sides. A dry ditch also protected these three sides. A caponier, a rare feature in US forts, projected into the ditch to defend it against attack. Two smaller caponiers enclosed the ends of the ditch, projecting off the seacoast front. The fort's sally port was in the middle of this front. A square redoubt with its own ditch was located behind the fort to provide an initial landward defense position.

Though references to the structure as Fort Hamilton occur as early as 1826, it was not officially named for the former Senior Officer of the United States Army and first Secretary of the Treasury, Alexander Hamilton, until the twentieth century. In 1839 the Federal government gave permission to New York State's 27th Regiment to drill at the fort, thus qualifying it as the nation's first National Guard training camp. The following year, it allocated $20,000 to improve the fort's armaments, and Captain Robert E. Lee, then an officer of the Army Corps of Engineers, was assigned the task of improving the defenses of the fort as well as those of other military installations in the area. Lee served as Fort Hamilton's post engineer from 1841 to 1846 and is credited with the initial design of several subsequent New York-area forts, notably the rebuilt Fort Richmond and Fort Tompkins, along with the Fort at Willets Point and the Fort at Sandy Hook. From 1848 to 1850 Lieutenant Thomas "Stonewall" Jackson also served at Fort Hamilton, and in 1861 Captain Abner Doubleday served as the post commander, shortly after serving at Fort Sumter during the bombardment that started the Civil War.

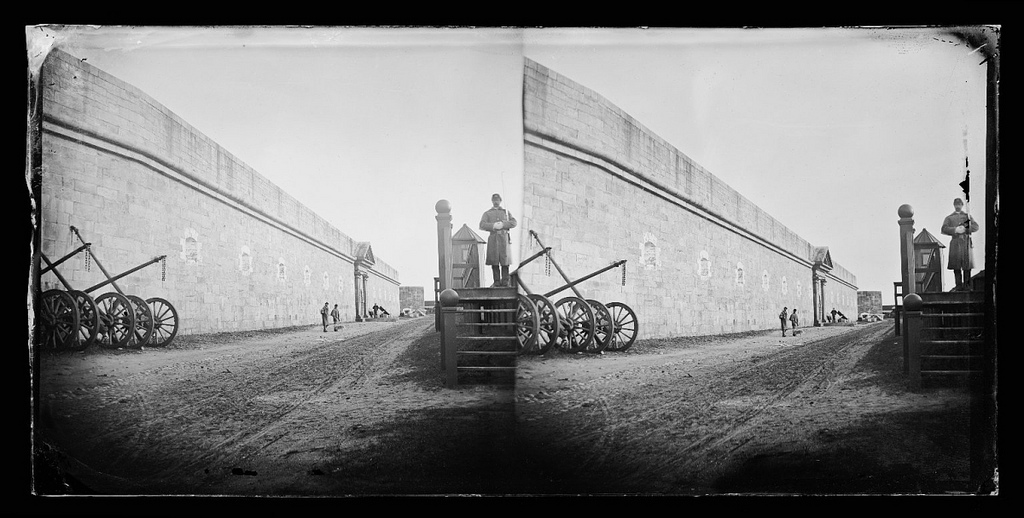
Sentry, Fort Hamilton, Brooklyn, c. 1872–1887

=== Civil War ===
During the Civil War, Fort Hamilton's garrison expanded. A ship barrier across the Narrows assisted Fort Hamilton and its sister forts on Staten Island, now called Fort Wadsworth, in protecting the harbor against the possibility of Confederate raiders. The forts also provided troops to help put down the New York Draft Riots of 1863. Fort Hamilton also served as a prisoner-of-war camp, and an exterior "New Battery" of guns was added.

Rifled cannon made vertical-walled masonry fortifications obsolete during the Civil War. The first response of the US coast defense forces to this was a series of new batteries, with guns in open positions behind low earth walls and brick magazines with heavy earth cover between the guns. Most of these were located near existing forts. In 1871 construction began at Fort Hamilton on an 8-gun water battery and a 15-gun mortar battery, but the latter was never completed or armed. Money for these projects ran out in the late 1870s, and US coast defense languished, with few improvements completed for nearly 20 years.

=== Endicott program ===
The 1885 Board of Fortifications, chaired by Secretary of War William C. Endicott and also called the Endicott Board, recommended sweeping improvements to US coast defenses, with a new generation of modern breech-loading rifled guns and numerous new gun batteries. Most of the Board's recommendations were adopted as the Endicott program, and that included major changes and improvements for Fort Hamilton. More than half of the old fort was demolished to make room for new concrete gun batteries. Fort Hamilton became part of the Artillery District of New York, renamed in 1913 as the Coast Defenses of Southern New York.

The following table shows the gun batteries completed at Fort Hamilton from 1898 to 1905. In most cases references do not indicate the precise model of gun or carriage at a particular battery, or the batteries' namesakes:

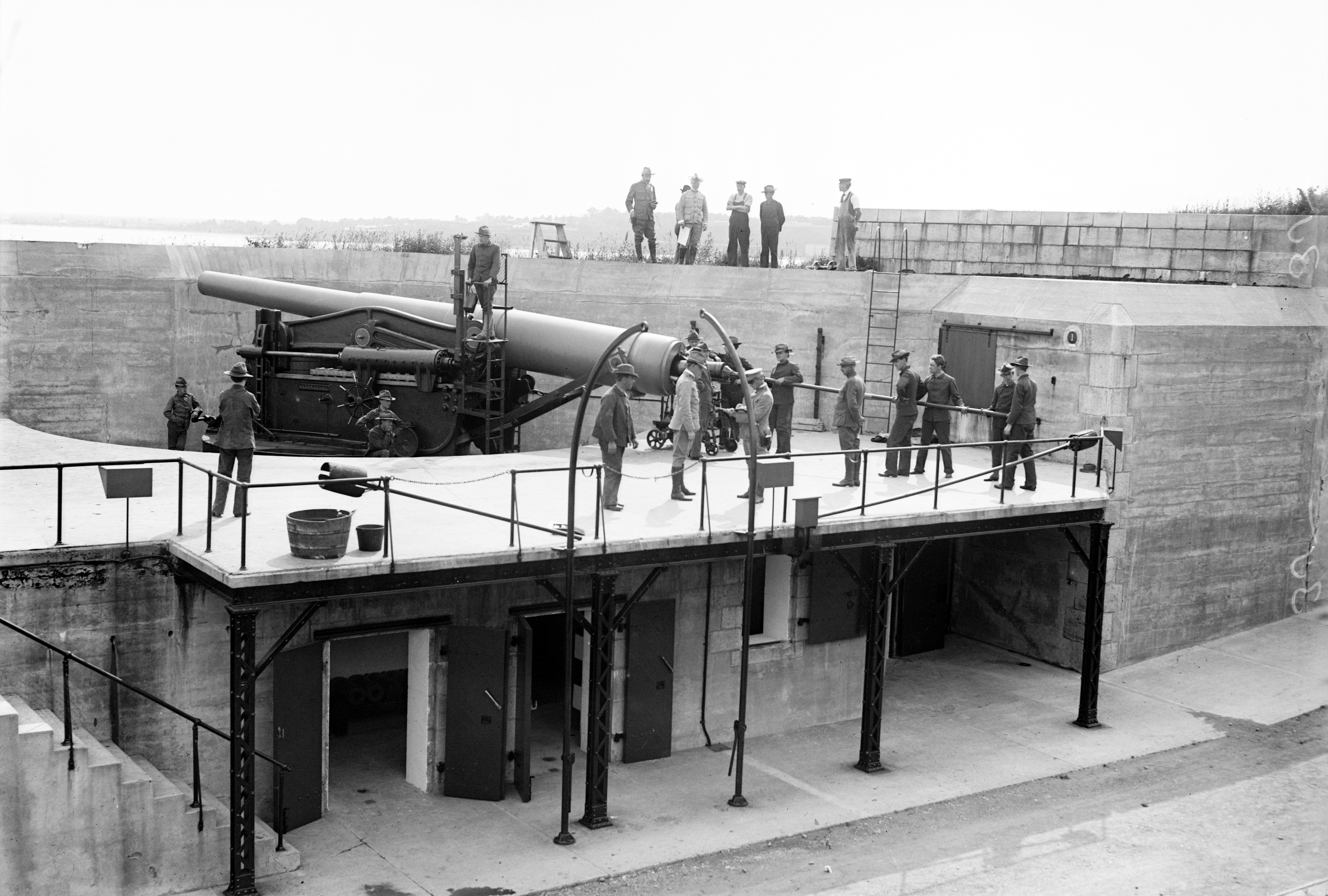
In June 1908, the 10th Company of the 13th Artillery District, NYNG (later the 245th Coast Artillery) loads a 10-inch gun at Fort Hamilton

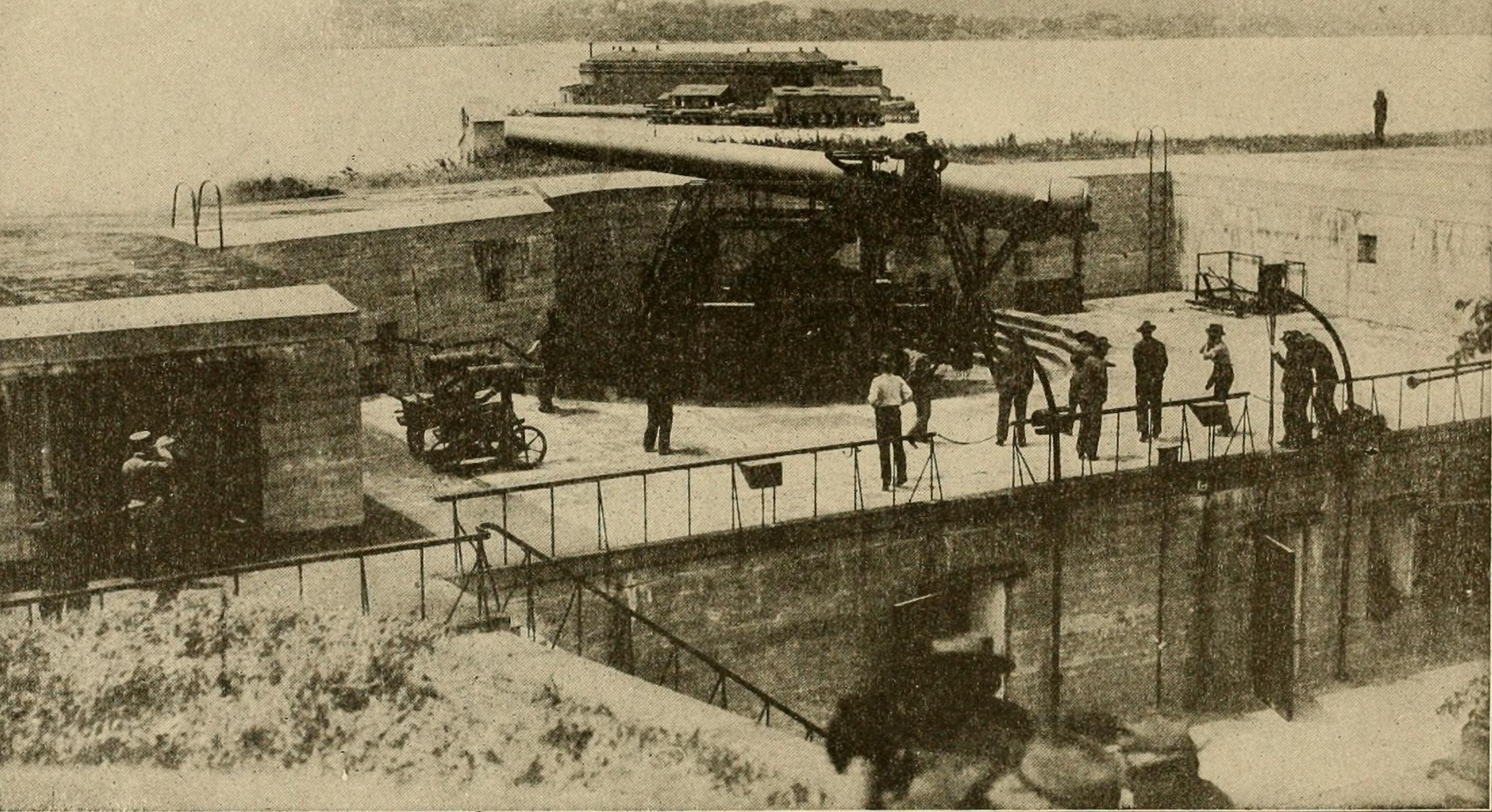
12-inch disappearing gun at Fort Hamilton with Fort Lafayette in the background

Name	No. of guns	Gun type	Carriage type	Years active
Piper	8	12-inch mortar	barbette	1901–1942
Harvey Brown	2	12-inch gun	disappearing	1902–?
Doubleday	2	12-inch gun	disappearing	1900–1943
Neary	2	12-inch gun M1888	barbette M1892	1900–1937
Gillmore	4	10-inch gun	disappearing	1899–1942
Spear	3	10-inch gun	disappearing	1898–1917
Burke	4	6-inch gun M1900	pedestal M1900	1903–1917
Livingston	2	6-inch gun M1905	disappearing M1903	1905–1920?
Livingston	2	6-inch gun M1900	pedestal M1900	1905–1948
Johnston	2	6-inch gun M1900	pedestal M1900	1902–1943
Mendenhall	4	6-inch gun	disappearing	1905–1917
Griffin	2	4.72-inch/45 caliber Armstrong gun	pedestal	1899–1913
Griffin	2	3-inch gun M1898	masking parapet M1898	1902–1920
Griffin	2	3-inch gun M1903	pedestal M1903	1903–1946

Several batteries (Burke, Johnston, Brown, and Griffin) were directly in front of the remains of the old fort, with Battery Griffin in front of and below the others. The other batteries extended in a line southeast of the old fort, with Battery Piper, the mortar battery, well to the rear of the line. Battery Griffin seems to have been designed as a mixed battery of two each M1898 and M1903 3-inch guns. The 4.72-inch guns of this battery were hastily added after the outbreak of the Spanish–American War in 1898; they were British guns purchased because most of the Endicott program was still years from completion. The 4.72-inch/45 caliber guns were transferred to Fort Kamehameha, Hawaii in 1913 to concentrate this type of weapon in one area. Battery Livingston was also an unusual combination of two disappearing 6-inch guns and two guns on pedestal mounts. Batteries Gillmore and Spear were originally a 7-gun battery under the former name, but were split up in 1903, probably for improved fire control.

=== World War I ===
The American entry into World War I brought many changes to Fort Hamilton, as at most other coast defense installations. Numerous temporary buildings were constructed to house the influx of new recruits, draftees, and units in training prior to deployment overseas. As the Coast Artillery was one of the Army's few sources of trained personnel, the branch was chosen to operate almost all US-manned heavy and railway artillery in that war, most of which was French- or British-made. Most personnel at the forts were transferred to new heavy artillery regiments. Also, several of Fort Hamilton's guns were dismounted for potential service on the Western Front; however, very few Army Coast Artillery weapons were actually used in that war, due to shipping priorities and extensive training. Battery Spear's three 10-inch guns were dismounted for potential use as railway artillery. The eight 6-inch guns of Batteries Burke and Mendenhall were dismounted for potential use on field carriages. Two of these guns, along with four of Battery Piper's 12-inch mortars, were used as the first batteries of Fort Tilden in nearby Far Rockaway, Queens. The removal of half of the mortars was also part of a forcewide program to improve the rate of fire of the remaining mortars. None of the weapons removed from Fort Hamilton in World War I were returned to the fort.

=== Between the wars ===
The end of World War I also meant more changes for Fort Hamilton. Around 1920 Battery Livingston's pair of 6-inch disappearing guns were transferred to West Point to be used for training cadets. These two guns are preserved today at Fort Pickens near Pensacola, Florida and Battery Chamberlin at the Presidio of San Francisco, the last 6-inch disappearing guns outside of the Philippines. Battery Griffin's pair of 3-inch M1898 guns was removed in 1920, part of a withdrawal from service of some gun types. In 1921 two long-range batteries of 12-inch guns were completed at Fort Hancock, New Jersey, and by 1924 the installation of 16-inch guns at Fort Tilden relegated Fort Hamilton to the second line of New York's coast defenses. In 1937 Battery Neary's pair of 12-inch guns was removed.

=== World War II ===
In World War II Fort Hamilton primarily served as a mobilization center, as it had in World War I. Except for the two remaining 6-inch pedestal guns of Battery Livingston and the pair of 3-inch guns at Battery Griffin, the remaining guns were gradually scrapped; the pair of 16-inch guns at the Highlands Military Reservation in New Jersey along with Fort Tilden superseded the older defenses. An anti-aircraft battery, probably of 90 mm guns, was at the fort during the war.

=== Post World War II ===
Shortly after World War II it was decided that gun coast defenses were obsolete. In 1948, the last coast defense gun was removed from Fort Hamilton. A battery of four 120 mm M1 guns was at the fort 1952-54, part of the Cold War air defense system. In the late 1950s and early 1960s the now-disused gun batteries were demolished or buried for the Verrazzano–Narrows Bridge and the Belt Parkway.

=== Units ===
The following Regular Army units were established at Fort Hamilton:

- 12th Infantry Regiment: October 20, 1861
- 21st Infantry Regiment: May 20, 1862
- 5th Coast Artillery Regiment, 1924

In the 1960s, Fort Hamilton also served as the home for the United States Army Chaplain School as it moved from the recently closed Fort Slocum. Hundreds of Army, Army Reserve and Army National Guard Chaplains and their assistants were trained here for active duty and reserve ministries to soldiers and their dependents. The school was later moved across the Narrows to Fort Wadsworth, and still later to Fort Jackson, South Carolina where it now resides.

== Description ==
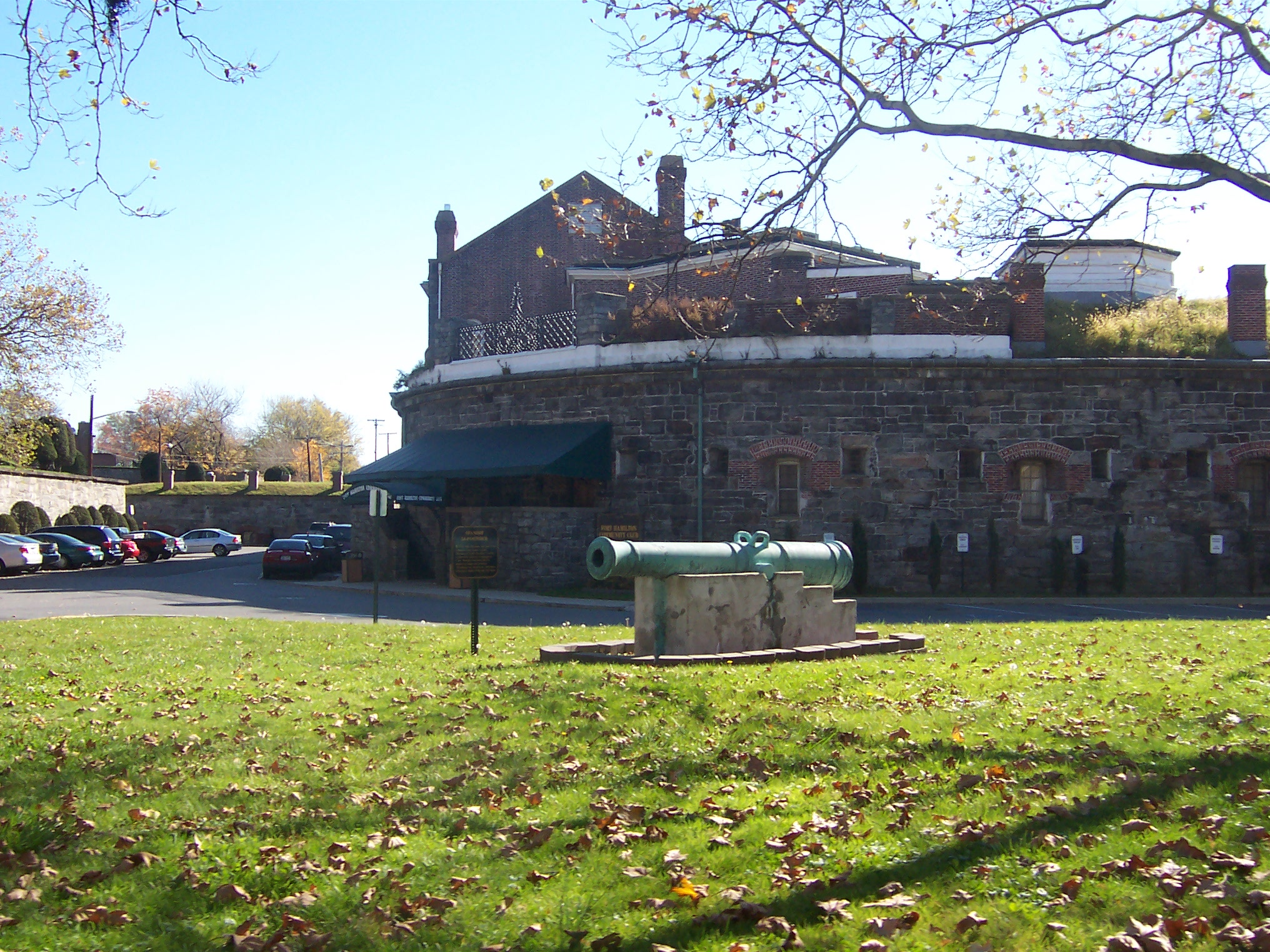
Ft. Hamilton Historic Community Club in the old fort

Fort Hamilton is the only active-duty DoD military post in New York City. Fort Hamilton was once a sister fortification to Fort Wadsworth on Staten Island. The two forts were part of a system of military installations in New York City, including Fort Tilden and Fort Totten in Queens; Fort Wood and Governors Island in Manhattan; Hart Island and Fort Schuyler in the Bronx; and Brooklyn Army Terminal, Brooklyn Navy Yard and Floyd Bennett Field in Brooklyn.

U.S. Army Fort Hamilton Garrison is the home of the New York City Recruiting Battalion, the Military Entrance Processing Station, the North Atlantic Division Headquarters of the United States Army Corps of Engineers, the 1179th Transportation Brigade and the 722nd Aeromedical Staging Squadron, the latter organization being a geographically separated unit (GSU) of the 439th Airlift Wing of the Air Force Reserve Command. Fort Hamilton also supports many Army Reserve and New York Army National Guard units, These Army National Guard units include the 133d Quartermaster Company, Company C/642d Aviation Support Battalion, 222d Chemical Company, and the 107th Military Police Company. Currently Fort Hamilton is under Installation Management Command headquartered at Fort Sam Houston, TX.

The construction of the Verrazzano–Narrows Bridge in the early 1960s did away with several historic structures, including Fort Lafayette, which was located near the Brooklyn shore where the bridge tower now rises from the water. During the same period, efforts toward saving the historical heritage of the Narrows increased. Part of the U.S. Army's contribution to preserving this heritage is in the Harbor Defense Museum at Fort Hamilton.

The original fort later became the Officers' Club and now houses the Community Club. The caponier, a miniature fort guarding the main fort's gate, now houses the Harbor Defense Museum. Other notable landmarks include the Robert E. Lee House, where Lee, then a captain, resided while post engineer of the garrison, and Colonels' Row, six historic townhouses that used to house senior officers. All of these structures are listed on the National Register of Historic Places.

In the 2000s, the historic parade field that once lay behind the old New York Area Command (NYAC) Headquarters Building and the Military Personnel Office, former site of numerous ceremonies and festivities, was developed into swiftly built privatized housing. The historic flag pole and cannon are still present at the site, near the old headquarters building and across from the Post Exchange barber shop.

In 2007, the historic brick barracks, located on the plot of land within Pershing Loop on the eastern portion of the base, which formerly housed the New York Area Command's Ceremonial Platoon and Military Police Company, was demolished. The ceremonial platoon, consisting of only infantrymen, once performed funeral honors and ceremonial functions (such as deployment as color guards in New York City parades, or firing cannons to start the New York City Marathon), in the greater N.Y. area, including Long Island, New York City, as well as parts of New Jersey, along with the 26th Army Band unit that was similar to the Old Guard in Washington, D.C.

A Civil War-era experimental 20-inch Rodman gun, one of two remaining and the largest gun produced by either side in that period, is in John Paul Jones Park immediately north of the fort. Numerous shells for this weapon are displayed on the fort grounds. An ex-Navy 12"/45 caliber Mark V Mod 8 gun is also displayed on post, representative of the type of weapon the fort had in the Endicott era.

== Education ==
On-post residents, including their dependents, are in the New York City Department of Education school district. The zoned K-8 school is P.S./I.S. 104 The Fort Hamilton School, and the public high school in the area is Fort Hamilton High School.

== In popular culture ==
In Marvel Comics, the second issue of G.I. Joe (1982) has a primary character reporting that Cobra prisoners will be delivered to the stockade located on Fort Hamilton.

Fort Hamilton is featured prominently in Law and Order: Special Victims Unit season 19 episode 18, titled "Service".

Fort Hamilton is the setting for nearly all of Nelson DeMille's novel Word of Honor.

In The Lords of Flatbush, Jane Bradshaw's (Susan Blakely) father (Bill van Sleet) is an Army officer newly assigned to Fort Hamilton. Jane's parents tell her on their way out to dinner that they can be reached at the Fort Hamilton officers' club that evening.

== See also ==
- Seacoast defense in the United States
- United States Army Coast Artillery Corps
