= Sainte Anne Church (Mackinac Island) =

Roman Catholic church in Michigan, USA

- Ste. Anne Catholic Church
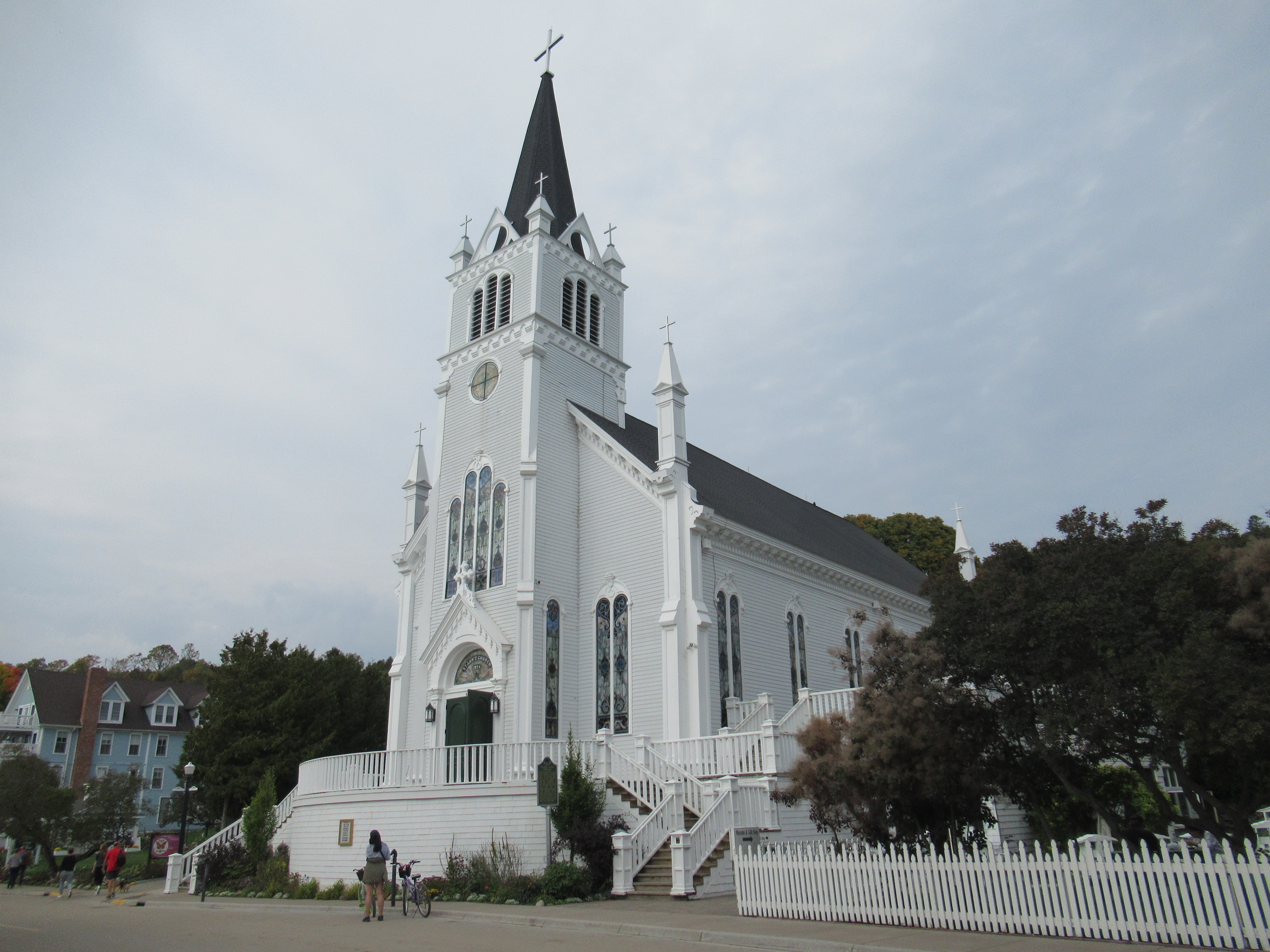
- Image of the church in October 2023
- Sainte Anne Church
- 45°51′01″N 84°36′41″W
- Address: 6836 Main Street (M-185); Mackinac Island, Michigan 49757
- Country: United States
- Denomination: Roman Catholic
- Website: Official website

History
- Founded: 1670 (356 years ago)
- Founder: Claude Dablon

Architecture
- Years built: 1874 (152 years ago)

Administration
- Diocese: Diocese of Marquette

- Sainte Anne Church
- U.S. National Historic Landmark District – Contributing property
- Michigan State Historic Site
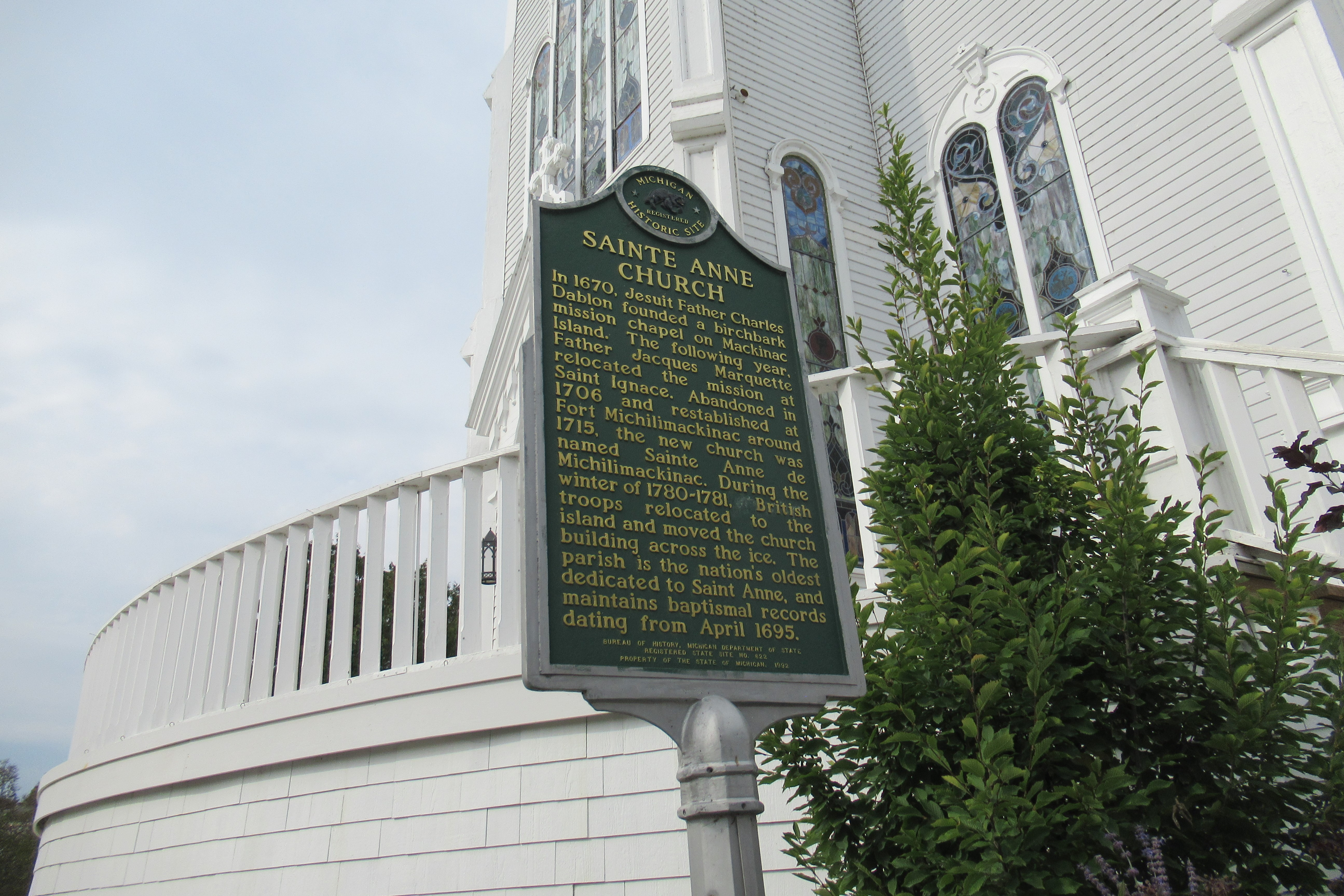
- Part of: Mackinac Island (ID66000397)

Significant dates
- Designated NHLDCP: October 15, 1966
- Designated MSHS: December 20, 1990

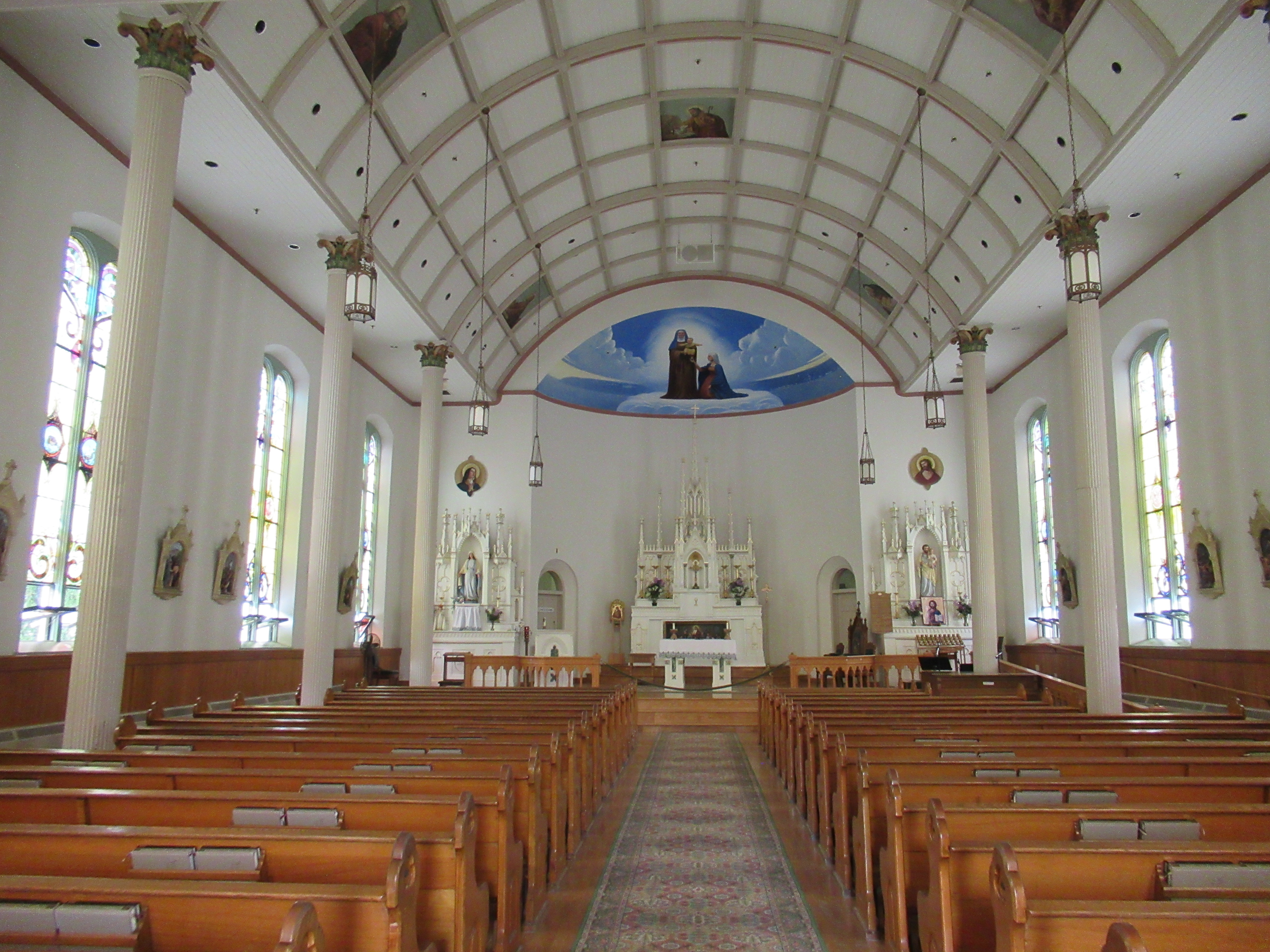
Interior of the church

Sainte Anne Church is a Roman Catholic church located in the city of Mackinac Island in the U.S. state of Michigan.

The Jesuit missionary Claude Dablon inaugurated the original church on Mackinac Island in 1670, and the earliest surviving parish records date back to 1695. After moving from Fort de Buade to Fort Michilimackinac in 1708 and from Fort Michilimackinac to Mackinac Island in 1781, the parish used a historic log church for decades. It constructed the current church complex in 1874 on a site donated by the former fur trader Magdelaine Laframboise. The church was dedicated as a Michigan State Historic Site on December 20, 1990.

== History ==
=== Jesuit mission ===
The parish began as a mission church of the Society of Jesus, served by Jesuits at Fort de Buade at the site of the current St. Ignace, and then by members of the same Order at Fort Michilimackinac (located within present-day Mackinaw City. The parish's Jesuit heritage became diluted in the 1740s when a primary focus of the mission outreach, the Odawa (Ottawa) peoples of the Straits of Mackinac, moved in search of fertile farmland from the sandy region around Fort Michilimackinac to new L'Arbre Croche locations southwestward along the Lake Michigan coast. Cross Village developed at their central village. The Fort Michilimackinac location evolved into service as a parish church for a partly transient population that included many traveling fur traders and voyageurs. The fort's church and parish were increasingly identified with Saint Anne, whom many voyageurs revered as a patron saint.

The remaining ties between the Society of Jesus and the parish of Sainte Anne de Michilimackinac were broken in 1765 when the news of the Suppression of the Society of Jesus was brought to the interior of North America. The Jesuit Order could no longer staff this or other Great Lakes mission churches. The parish was maintained through the devoted efforts of a succession of lay parishioners, many of them women. This status, which under other circumstances might have been seen as slightly irregular by the standards of that day, was accepted and celebrated by the Church because of the devotion of the parishioners. For example, the lay leadership carefully maintained a dwelling space, attached to the church, for the absent priest. It was during this period of de facto lay leadership, during which time the parish did not have an assigned priest, that the church building was disassembled and moved (under British orders) from Fort Michilimackinac to Mackinac Island, its new permanent home, in 1780–1781.

=== American frontier ===
The island and parish was defined as within United States territory in 1796 under the Jay Treaty with Great Britain settling the border with Canada. It was a thriving frontier community based on the fur trade. The economic growth of the Island's commerce and harbor attracted more Americans. The general indifference by the new American military authorities to the Catholic faith, led to the temporary disintegration of the church's structure of lay leadership. By 1803 Father Gabriel Richard, visiting the parish to offer the sacraments, found that the altar had been desecrated and the priest's quarters adapted for use as a brothel. After the War of 1812, the parish was saved by a prominent local fur trader, Madeline La Framboise, an Ojibwe who worked with a succession of visiting priests to restore the church's status as a place of worship. She also donated land to be used as a site for the church.

With continued settlement in the region, the Catholic Church re-established a geographically structured system of Catholic life and worship in Michigan Territory. Father Samuel Charles Mazzuchelli was assigned to Sainte Anne de Michilimackinac in 1830; he was the first resident priest in 65 years. The parish was reassigned in 1853 to what is today the current Diocese of Marquette. With population and economic growth, the church demolished its historic log structure in the 1870s. It replaced it with the timber-framed church, which begun in 1874 and was completed in the 1880s, and is still in use today.

=== Today ===
As the 300th anniversary of the church's parish record book approached, Sainte Anne Church was recognized in 1992 as a registered Michigan historic site, designated as SO622. A state historic marker was erected at the church. As measured by the continuity of its parish records, the parish of Sainte Anne de Michilimackinac is one of the oldest Roman Catholic parishes in the interior of North America. A museum is operated on the church's ground floor; it interprets and displays artifacts of the parish's history.
