= Hancock Barracks =

Coordinates: 46°7.736′N 67°48.885′W

Hancock Barracks was a 19th-century fortification near Houlton, Maine. It was an active United States Army post from 1828 to 1847.

== Origin ==
Controversy surrounded the boundary between Massachusetts (now Maine) and New Brunswick after the Treaty of Paris (1783) had ended the American Revolutionary War. The British invaded coastal Maine during the War of 1812, but the treaty ending that war simply reverted the border to that established in 1783. The Army anticipated further conflict along the border, and purchased 25 acres of land atop Garrison Hill east of Houlton, Maine.

The United States Army in 1828 established Hancock Barracks to quarter a garrison of two hundred troops. At the time of its construction, Hancock Barracks lay farther northeast than any other Army installation in the United States. Soldiers and their family members who died at the post were interred at the post cemetery. Locals took jobs supplying the troops, stimulating the local economy. Workers completed military and state roads connecting Hancock Barracks with Bangor, Maine, open for travel after 1834.

== Aroostook War ==
Conflict quickly arose regarding the definition of the border with Maine and New Brunswick authorities expressing sovereignty in the area. Lumbermen and settlers infiltrated the Aroostook region from both sides. Major Reynold M. Kirby arrived at Hancock Barracks in October 1838 along with Captain Lucien B. Webster.

When the Aroostook War flared in 1839, three companies of the 1st Artillery Regiment manned Hancock Barracks under Major Reynold M. Kirby. Maine legislature sent twelve companies of state militia, and Major Kirby helped to restrain them from starting a shooting war. The officer corps in 1840/1841 briefly included Second Lieutenant Michael Simpson Culbertson. In 1839 Brigadier General Winfield Scott successfully negotiated a truce that minimized hostilities until Webster-Ashburton Treaty settled the boundary dispute in 1842.

The Army made Hancock Barracks the headquarters of 1st Artillery Regiment in 1840. Despite the bitter weather, it gained a reputation as a good post. American army officers occasionally made merriment with their British counterparts in nearby Woodstock, New Brunswick.

== Decommissioning ==
The Army abandoned Hancock Barracks in 1847. With the authorization of Congress, the War Department sold the buildings at auction in 1873.
