= Benjamin Blacksmith Shop =

- U.S. National Historic Landmark District – Contributing property
- Location within Michigan Location within the United States
- Location: Market Street; Mackinac Island, Michigan
- Coordinates: 45.84912°N 84.61948°W
- Part of: Mackinac Island (ID66000397)
- Designated NHLDCP: October 15, 1966

The Benjamin Blacksmith Shop is a blacksmithy and museum, in operation since before 1885, located adjacent to the Biddle House on Market Street on Mackinac Island in the U.S. state of Michigan. It is part of Mackinac Island State Park. Mackinac Island is known for its local ordinances that forbid privately operated motor vehicles and encourage widespread use of horses, and this smithy displays and celebrates examples of the craft of horseshoeing.

== History and today ==
The Star Blacksmith Shop was bought by blacksmith-postmaster Robert Benjamin in 1885. At that time, and for 80 years thereafter, it operated at a slightly different location on Market Street. Mackinac Island's population was not big enough to allow the Benjamin family to specialize in the work done by the shop. It operated as a mixed smithy, performing craft forge operations and horseshoeing for the Island's large summer and smaller winter populations.

After blacksmith Herbert Benjamin's death in 1965, the Benjamin Blacksmith Shop was threatened with closure. In 1968, heir Robert "Bob" Benjamin donated the shop and its fittings to the Mackinac Island State Park Commission, which moved the building to its present location adjacent to the Biddle House and restored it to its appearance in the 1950s.

As a tourist attraction starting in 1968, the Benjamin Blacksmith Shop largely ended its horseshoeing work (which continued at other locations on Mackinac Island) and specialized in craft metalwork. Blacksmiths can be seen at this location throughout the State Park's period of full summer operations, forging mild steel items and implements for use by the State Park and sale to the public.

Admission is by Fort Mackinac ticket. Since 1985, the Shop has hosted an annual Blacksmith Convention, usually held on the first weekend in August.
