= McGulpin House =

Historic house in Michigan, United States

- U.S. National Historic Landmark District – Contributing property
- Michigan State Historic Site
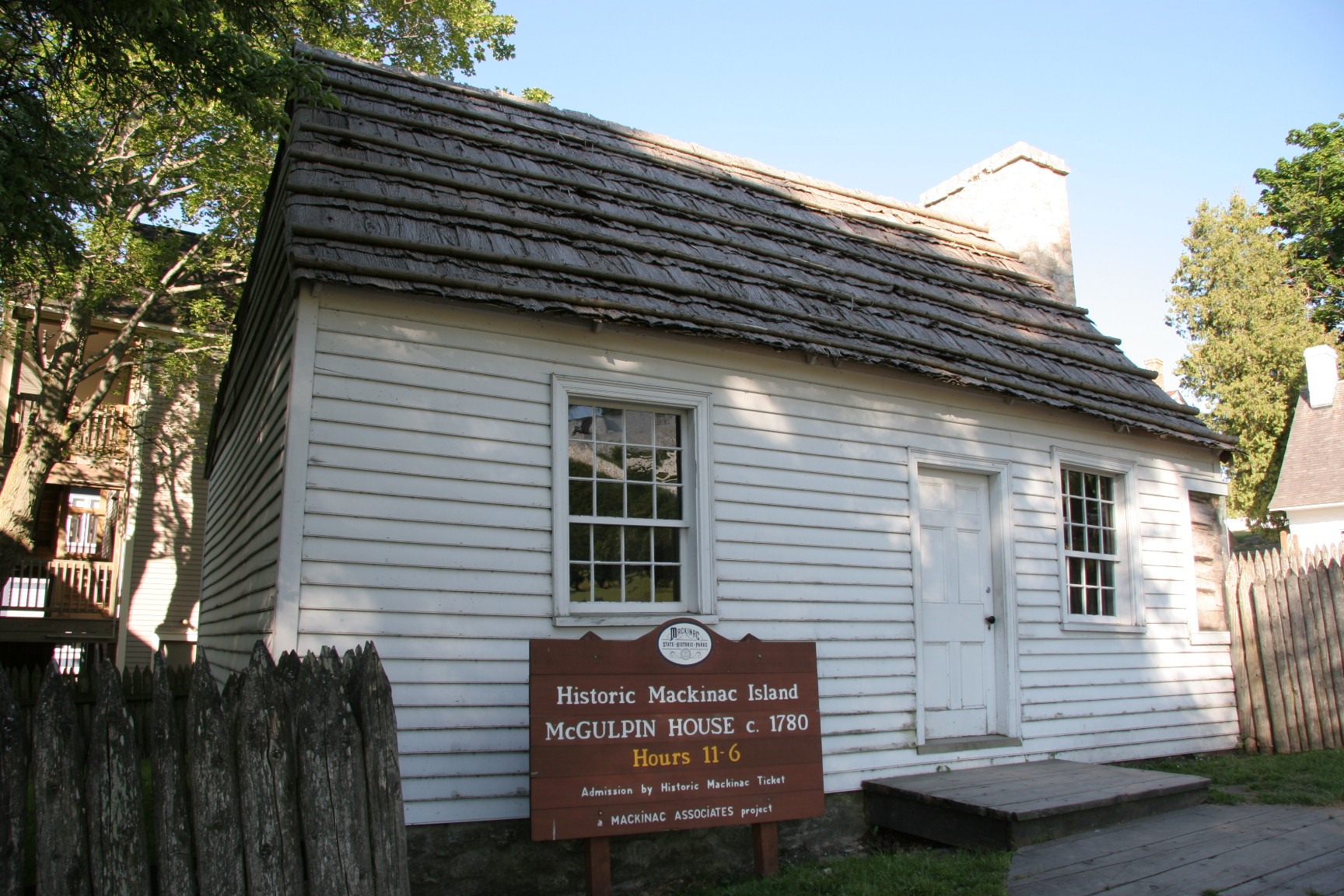
- McGulpin House, June 2006

- Location within Michigan Location within the United States
- Location: Market Street; Mackinac Island, Michigan
- Coordinates: 45.85061°N 84.61757°W
- Part of: Mackinac Island (ID66000397)

Significant dates
- Designated NHLDCP: October 15, 1966
- Designated MSHS: July 19, 1956

The McGulpin House is a historic house museum, located in a structure originally built before 1780 and now located at the corner of Fort Street and Market Street on Mackinac Island, Michigan. It is owned, operated, and opened to the public during the summer months by Mackinac Island State Park as part of Historic Downtown Mackinac Island.

== History and today ==
The McGulpin House is built in a working-class French Canadian style. Its origins are unknown; it has not always stood on its current location. There are two theories about the origins of the building: the house could have been created as a home for the priest of St. Anne's Church or to be a home for people on the island. An analysis of the home's structural timbers indicates that they were hand-sawn with a pit saw, which indicates that the timbers were cut prior to the construction of the Mill Creek sawmill in about 1790.

The house's timbers and design style indicate, but do not prove, that the structure was constructed prior to the settlement of Mackinac Island in 1780–1781. It is known that several private frontier houses were built in the vicinity of Fort Michilimackinac in the period between 1763 and 1780, which were prosperous years for the fur trade at the Straits of Mackinac. In 1780 Lieutenant Governor Patrick Sinclair, in a move related to the American Revolutionary War, ordered the fur traders and private citizens of the Fort Michilimackinac settlement to move to a fortified village on the southern end of Mackinac Island. The Strait of Mackinac froze solid with ice that winter, and there is documentary evidence that some wooden houses were partly dismantled and carried across the ice to their new island settlement. It is believed that the McGulpin House may have been one of these homes.

After the War of 1812 the United States consolidated its political and economic control over Mackinac Island, the fur trade boomed, a title deed registry was opened, and written real estate records began. In 1819, what is now the McGulpin House was purchased by William and Madeline McGulpin, a craftsman baker and his wife. The McGulpins operated a shoreline farm on the Lower Peninsula mainland, near what is now Mackinaw City. The site of their farm was later named McGulpin Point in honor of these pioneer settlers.

With local grain in hand, the McGulpins specialized in baking bread and hardtack for the American Fur Company's establishment on Mackinac Island. The fur company post on Market Street was by far the largest employer at the Straits of Mackinac, and resupplied dozens of fur traders who fanned out over the Upper Great Lakes by birchbark canoe to trap and trade for furs.

The McGulpin House was moved to its current location in 1981. It has been opened to the public as a barebones restoration that concentrates on the actual structure of the home at it would have appeared around 1820, shortly after the McGulpins moved in. The McGulpins were a working-class family who would not have possessed a home fitted with many of the furnishings used by more prosperous families in the early American upper class. The McGulpin House can be compared with the nearby Biddle House, an upper-class home.
