= Skull Cave =

- U.S. National Historic Landmark District – Contributing property
- Michigan State Historic Site
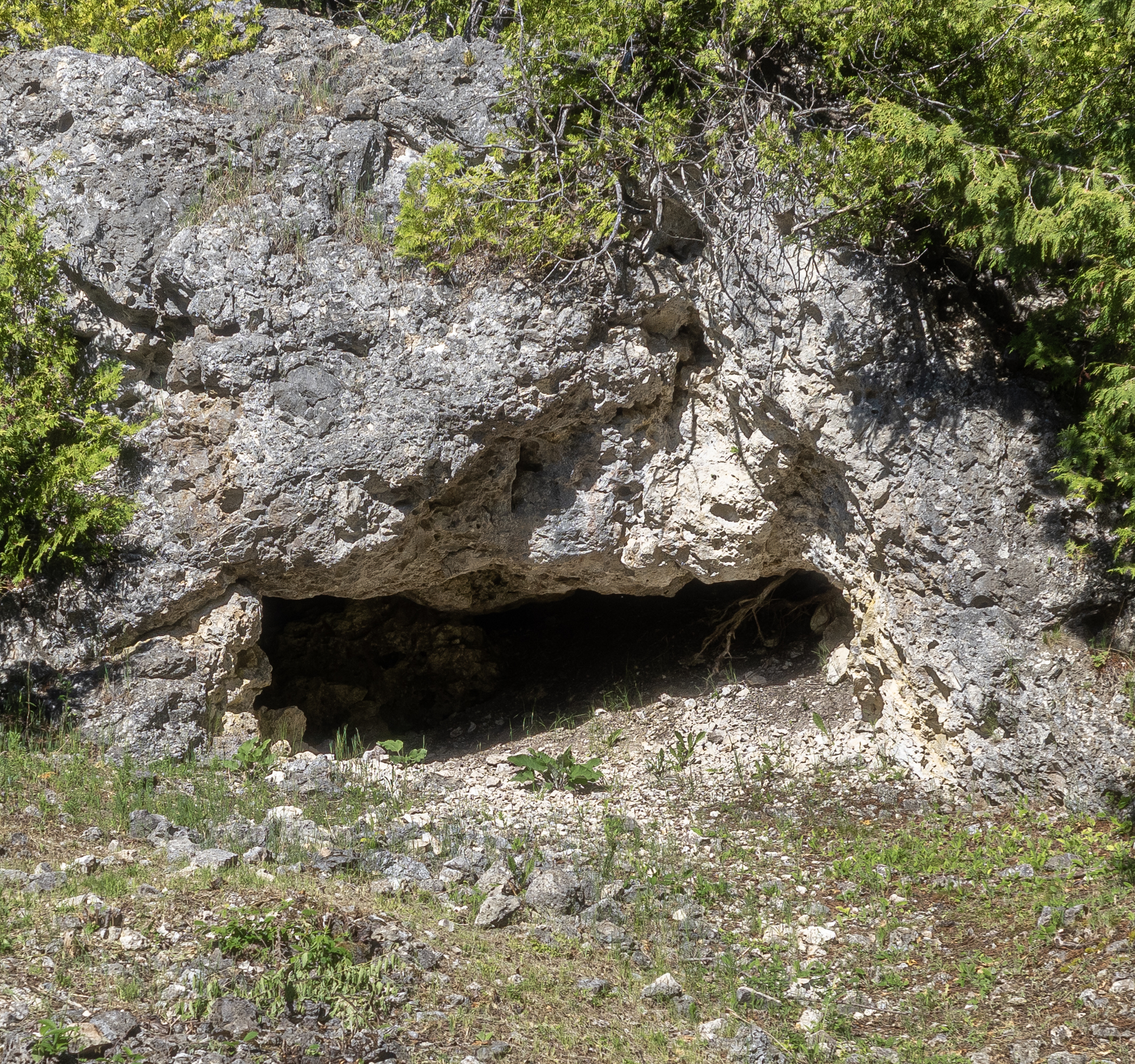
- Skull Cave in 2026

- Location within Michigan Location within the United States
- Location: Garrison Road; Mackinac Island, Michigan
- Coordinates: 45°51′26.8″N 84°37′06.8″W
- Part of: Mackinac Island (ID66000397)

Significant dates
- Designated NHLDCP: October 15, 1966
- Designated MSHS: January 12, 1959

Skull Cave is a small and shallow cave on the central heights of Mackinac Island in Michigan, United States. The cave was carved during the Algonquin post-glacial period by the waters of Lake Algonquin, a swollen meltwater ancestor of today's Lake Huron.

Skull Cave is primarily of interest for its historical associations. It is believed to have been used as an inhumation site by Native Americans of the Straits of Mackinac area in the 18th century.

While in active use as a site for human remains, the cave was also used as a refuge in 1763 by fur trader Alexander Henry, a survivor of the capture of Fort Michilimackinac by Native Americans during Pontiac's War. In his "Memoirs," Henry recalled a night spent as a refugee in the bone-strewn cavern.

Henry recalled his ordeal as follows:

On going into the cave, of which the entrance was nearly ten feet wide, I found the further end to be rounded in its shape, like that of an oven, but with a further aperture, too small, however, to be explored. After thus looking around me, I broke small branches from the trees and spread them for a bed, then wrapped myself in my blanket and slept till day-break. On awaking, I felt myself incommoded by some object upon which I lay, and, removing it, found it to be a bone. This I supposed to be that of a deer, or some other animal, and what might very naturally be looked for in the place in which I was; but when daylight visited my chamber I discovered, with some feelings of horror, that I was lying on nothing less than a heap of human bones and skulls, which covered the floor!

Skull Cave is contained within Mackinac Island State Park. It is located 0.4 miles (0.6 km) north of Fort Mackinac in the island's interior. It was designated as a Michigan Historic Site on January 12, 1959, and granted state historical marker #L0004.
