= Fort Holmes =

- U.S. National Historic Landmark District – Contributing property
- Michigan State Historic Site
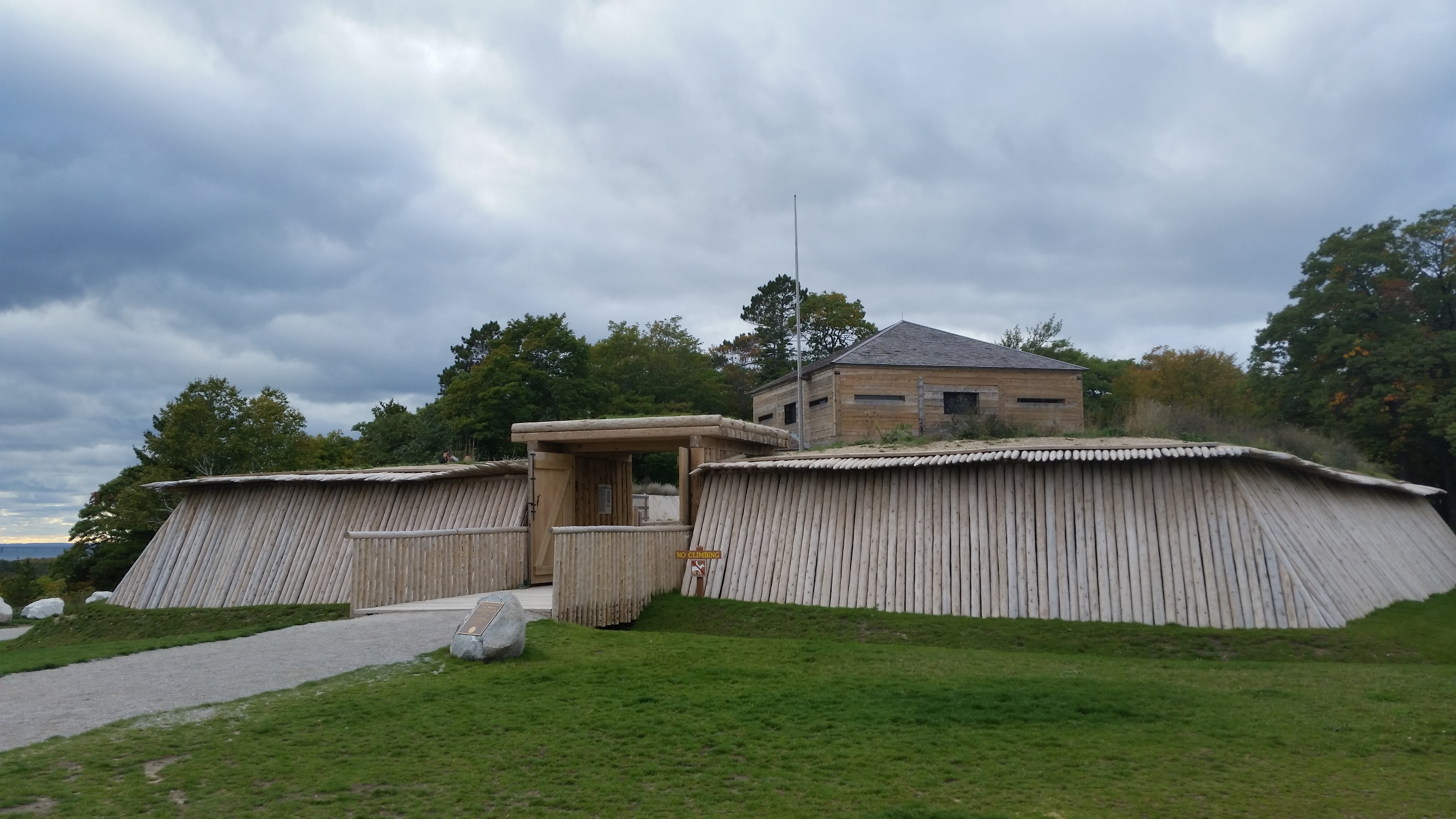

- Location within Michigan Location within the United States
- Location: Mackinac Island, Michigan
- Coordinates: 45°51′30″N 84°36′59″W
- Part of: Mackinac Island (ID66000397)

Significant dates
- Designated NHLDCP: October 15, 1966
- Designated MSHS: September 25, 1956

Fort Holmes is a fortified earthen redoubt located on the highest point of Mackinac Island. Originally built in 1814 by British forces during the War of 1812, the redoubt was improved by that army throughout the course of the war (1812–1814) to help defend the adjacent Fort Mackinac from a possible attack by the U.S. Army.

The British named the redoubt Fort George and reinforced it with cannon, a blockhouse, and a magazine for gunpowder and other munitions. However, Fort Holmes never functioned as an independent military fortification. It was always a dependent outpost of nearby Fort Mackinac.

When United States armed forces reoccupied Mackinac Island in 1815 under the terms of the Treaty of Ghent, they took possession of Fort George. They surveyed and measured their prize, which they renamed Fort Holmes in honor of Major Andrew Holmes, a casualty in the 1814 Battle of Mackinac Island. However, the American army soon abandoned Fort Holmes. The earthworks and buildings of the former redoubt slowly eroded and disappeared over the course of more than a century.

In 1936, as part of its mission to provide employment through public works projects during the nationwide Great Depression, the Works Progress Administration used the original 1817 American survey to rebuild Fort Holmes to its War of 1812 appearance. As of 1984, however, most of the reconstructed buildings of Fort Holmes had again disappeared, except for the redoubt's earthen walls.

In 2015 the Mackinac Island State Park completed a second reconstruction of Fort Holmes that resumes the appearance that the redoubt had in 1817. The blockhouse includes interpretive panels inside, and is open in the summer. Many visitors come to the fort site for a view of the Straits of Mackinac, much of which is visible from this lookout point approximately 320 feet (98 m) above the surface of Lake Huron and 890 feet (271 m) above sea level. The redoubt and blockhouse can be rented for special occasions.

== Images ==
Location of Fort Holmes

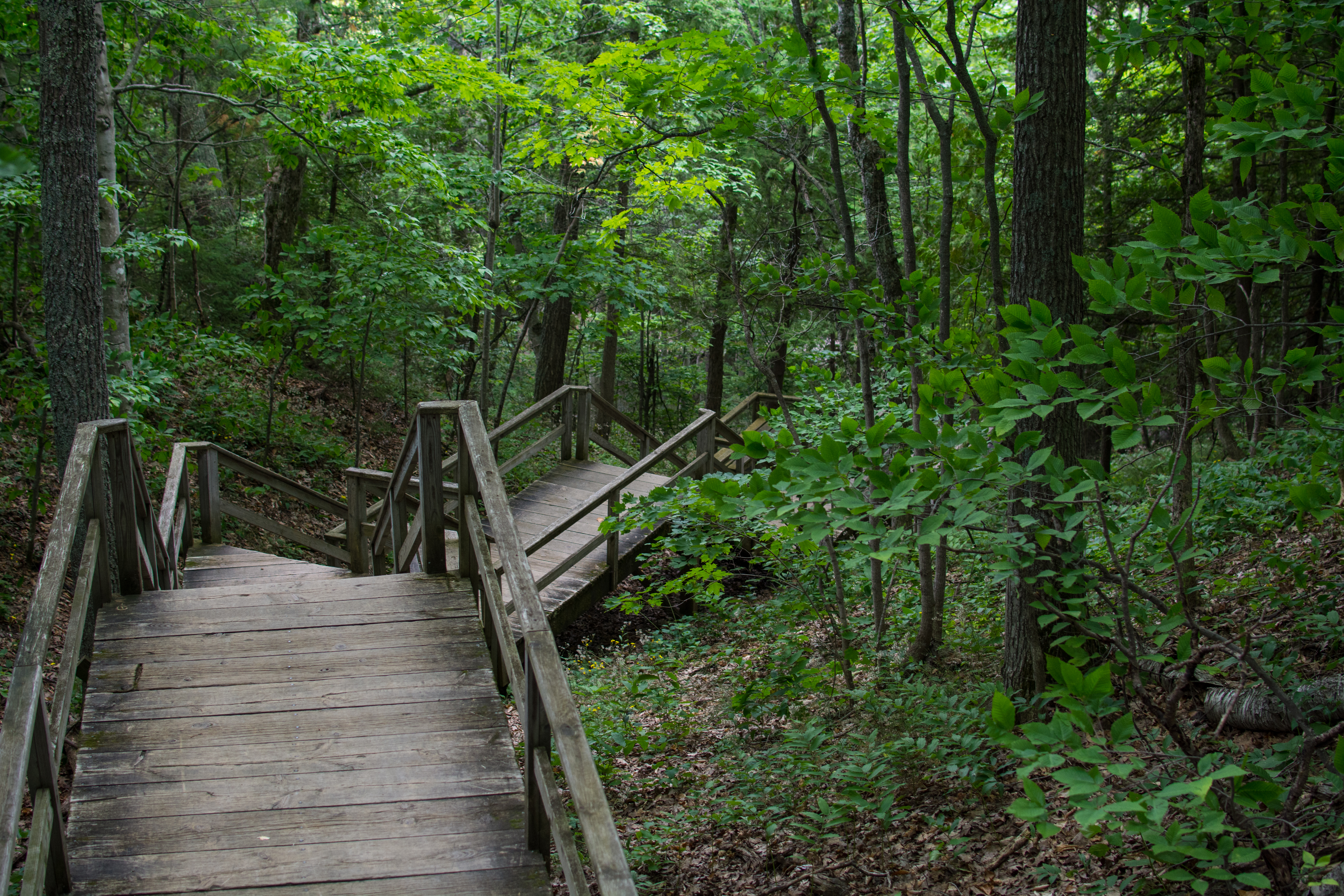
Stairway down from Fort Holmes

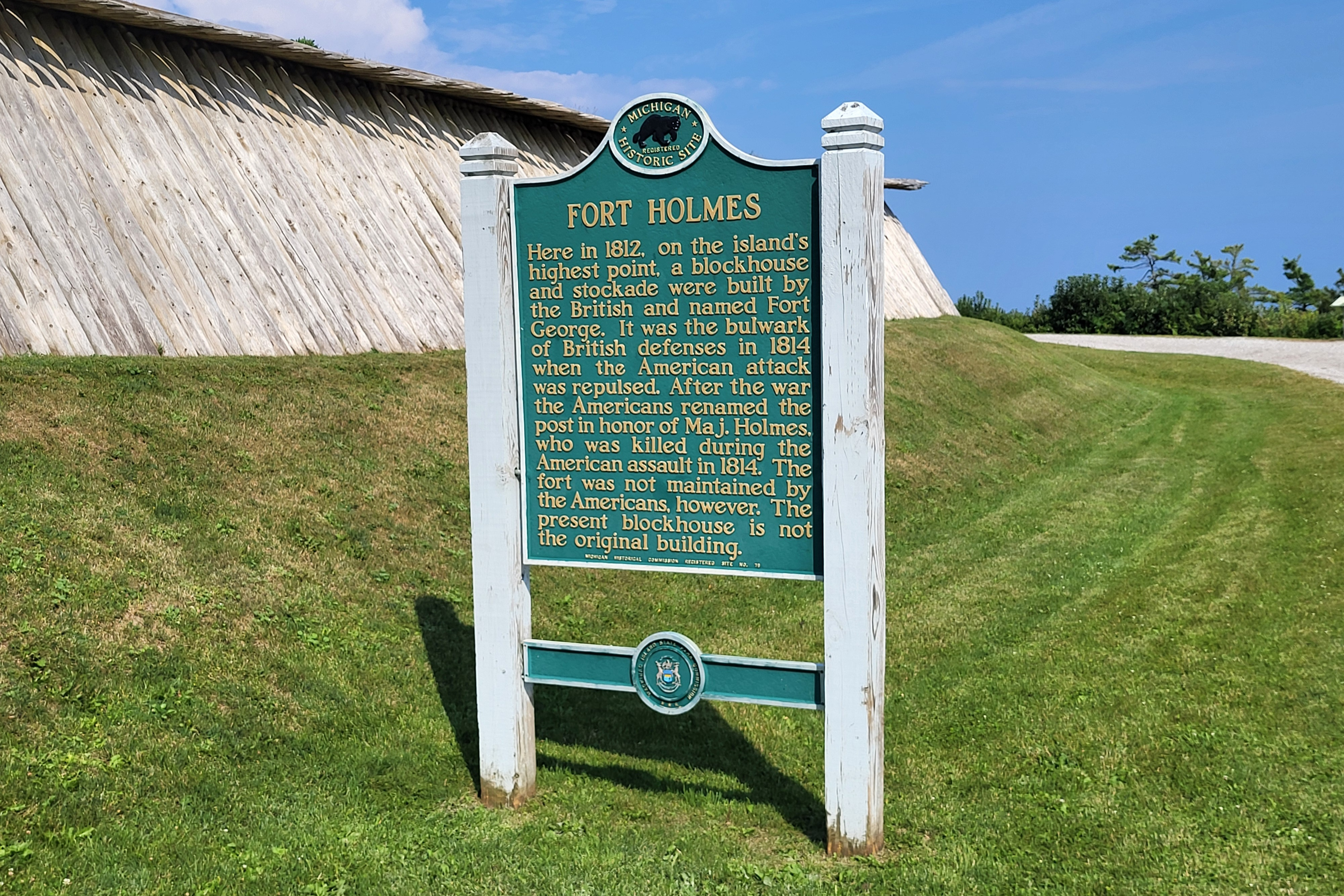
State historic marker

== See also ==
- Brian Leigh Dunnigan, Fort Holmes [Reports in Mackinac History and Archeology: No. 10] (Mackinac State Historic Parks, Mackinaw City, Mich.) .
