= Margaret Doud =

American politician (born 1943)

Mayor of Mackinac Island
- Incumbent
- Assumed office April 14, 1975
- Preceded by: Clem Gunn

Personal details
- Born: May 29, 1943 (age 83)
- Education: Central Michigan University (BA)

Margaret M. Doud (born May 29, 1943) is the mayor of Mackinac Island, Michigan. Doud has served as the mayor since April 14, 1975, making her the longest currently serving mayor in the United States. She has run unopposed as a nonpartisan in most of the 51 mayoral elections that she has won.

== Career ==
Margaret M. Doud was born on May 29, 1943. Her father, Robert Doud, and her grandfather, James Doud, both were mayor of Mackinac Island prior to her tenure. She is a graduate of Central Michigan University.

Doud was first appointed to the Mackinac Island City Council in 1974, filling the term of retiring council-member Dennis Brodeur. In 1975, Doud defeated former mayor Otto Emmons to succeed retiring incumbent Clemens Gunn. She took office on April 14, 1975.

Although Mackinac Island has about 600 residents, this popular vacation destination welcomes over 1 million visitors during the tourist season, so the city government provides services and infrastructure to accommodate thousands of visitors at a time throughout the summer months. The mayor and the six-member city council oversee large fire, police, and infrastructure services similar to those required for large cities but that are tailored to island priorities of sustainability, walkability, and bicycle or horse-drawn transportation. For more than 50 years, Doud has been the spokesperson for the island. She has stated that her priorities are to preserve and protect the unique history and culture of the island while adapting as necessary to the realities of 21st century expectations.

On May 22, 2005, she was given special recognition for her service. This included a certificate of recognition by Senator Debbie Stabenow and a tribute by the State of Michigan and then-Governor Jennifer Granholm. She was also presented with a flag that was flown over the U.S. Capitol building by Fr. Jim Williams, the pastor of Ste. Anne's Church, on behalf of Congressman Bart Stupak.

As well as being the mayor, she managed the historical Windermere Hotel along with her mother, Jeannette Doud, and now manages it full-time after her mother's death in 2015. She occasionally contributes to The Mackinac Island Town Crier, the island's local newspaper.
