= Mackinac Island State Park =

State park on Mackinac Island in Michigan, United States

- Map of Mackinac Island showing the state park boundaries
- Location: Mackinac Island, Michigan; United States
- Coordinates: 45°52′N 84°37′W
- Area: 2.81 sq mi (7.3 km^{2})
- Established: 1875 (Mackinac National Park); 1895 (Mackinac Island State Park)
- Governing body: Michigan Department of Natural Resources / Mackinac Island State Park Commission
- Mackinac Island State Park
- U.S. National Historic Landmark District – Contributing property
- Part of: Mackinac Island (ID66000397)
- Designated NHLDCP: October 15, 1966

Mackinac Island State Park is a state park located on Mackinac Island in the U.S. state of Michigan. A Lake Huron island, it is near the Straits of Mackinac. The island park encompasses 1,800 acres (7.3 km^{2}), which is approximately 80% of the island's total area. The park is also within the boundaries of the city of Mackinac Island and has permanent residents within its boundaries. M-185 circles the perimeter of the park as the only motorless highway in the state due to the island's ban of automobiles. The park is governed by the Michigan Department of Natural Resources and the Mackinac Island State Park Commission. On July 15, 2009, the park celebrated its 20 millionth visitor.

The park was first established as Mackinac National Park in 1875, which was the second national park established in the United States after Yellowstone National Park. In 1895, it was transferred to state control and reorganized as Mackinac Island State Park, which was the first state park in Michigan. The park contains many important historical and geological features, such as Fort Mackinac, Fort Holmes, other historic buildings, historic sites, limestone caves, and other unique rock formations. The park also operates the Mackinac Island Airport. Many of these sites are formally operated by the Mackinac Island State Park Commission, which also operates two other parks around the Straits of Mackinac area: Colonial Michilimackinac and Dousman's Mill (formerly Historic Mill Creek Discovery Park).

== War of 1812 ==
Mackinac Island played an important role in the War of 1812 between the United States and Canada (then a British colony). Fort Mackinac, upon the island, was built by the British army during the Revolutionary War. The British later relinquished the fort to the Americans in 1796, but then built and maintained a similar fort on nearby St. Joseph Island. The two nations used their island forts in a struggle to maintain supremacy over the waters of northern Lake Huron. As one of the opening actions of the War of 1812, the British captured Fort Mackinac, and maintained it as a British stronghold until the end of the war. An American attempt to recapture the fort in 1814 failed in the Battle of Mackinac Island. When the war ended with the Treaty of Ghent in 1815, the island was returned to American control.

== History ==
=== National park ===
Mackinac National Park on March 3, 1875, was designed by Congress as the country's second national park after Yellowstone. Mackinac-born US Senator Thomas Ferry introduced the bill to do so after the Yellowstone designation. He argued that the active military personnel station there, as the island was then mostly a military reservation, would do double duty as caretakers of the island, which helped convince other congressmen. The park was placed within the United States Department of War.

With the leased parcel revenue plan in 1888, the fort was able to build trails, improve roads, and even put up an observation tower on the island's highest point at Fort Holmes.

The War Department decommissioned the fort given its lack of military strategic importance in 1890. With the decommissioning, the troops were moved off the island leaving no one to care for the park. The department suggested a sale of the park.

A grassroots lobbying campaign led in September 1895 for the U.S. government to turn over the park and fort to the State of Michigan. The state legislature established the Mackinac Island State Park Commission to manage the park and its structures as the first state park, Mackinac Island State Park.

== Information centers ==
- Soldiers' Barracks
- Visitor Center
- Mackinac Island Tourism Bureau

== Historic areas ==
=== Historic buildings ===
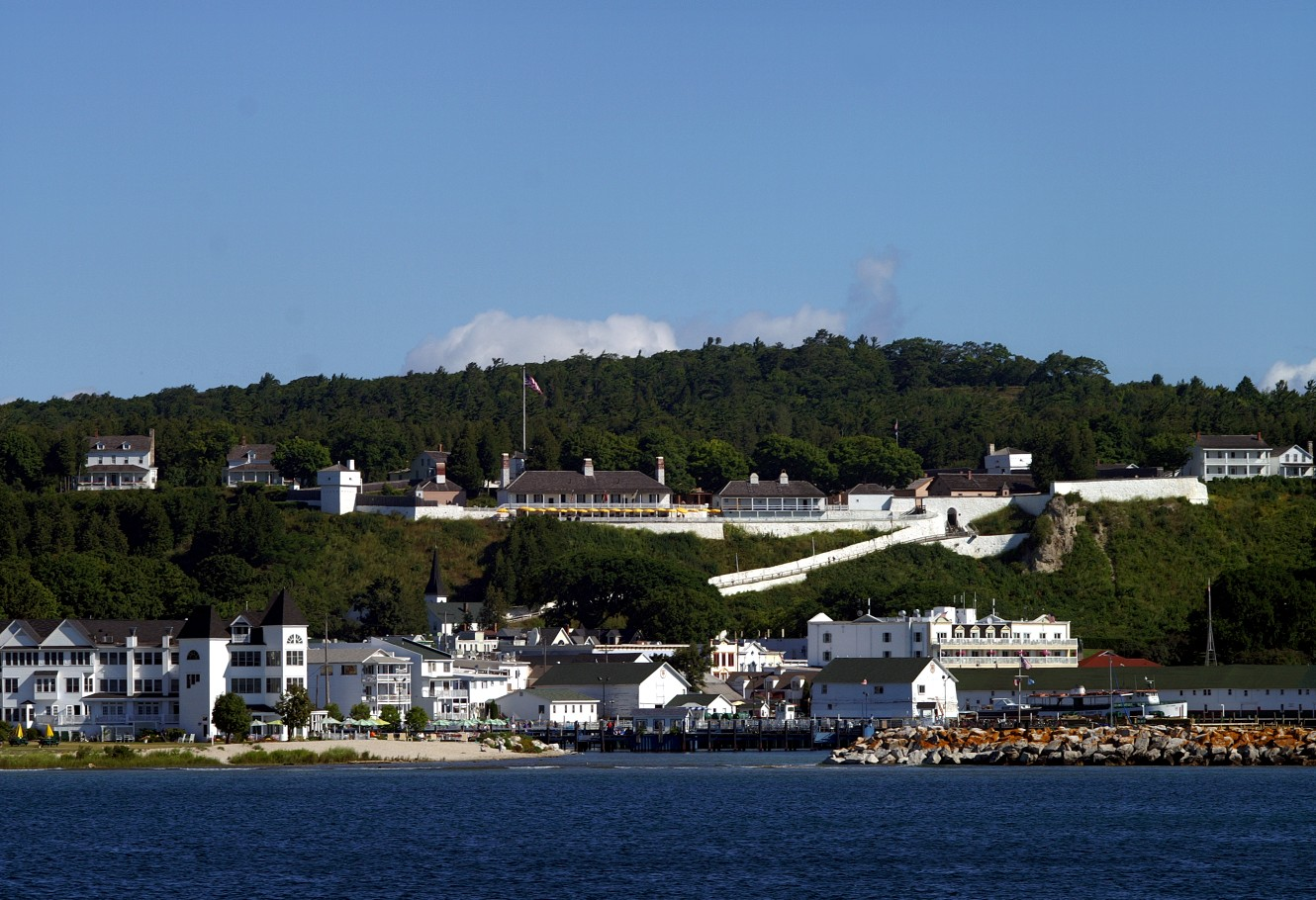
Fort Mackinac

- Fort Mackinac - museum
- Fort Holmes
- Mission Church - museum
- Mission House
- American Fur Company Retail Store & Dr. Beaumont Museum - museum
- Matthew Geary House
- Benjamin Blacksmith Shop - museum
- Biddle House - museum
- Governor's Mansion (Lawrence Andrew Young Cottage)
- Richard and Jane Manoogian Mackinac Art Museum - formerly Indian Dormitory
- McGulpin House - museum

=== Sites ===
- Battlefield of 1814
- British Landing
- Cemeteries
- Lime Kiln
- Marquette Park
- Wawashkamo Golf Club

== Caves and rock formations ==
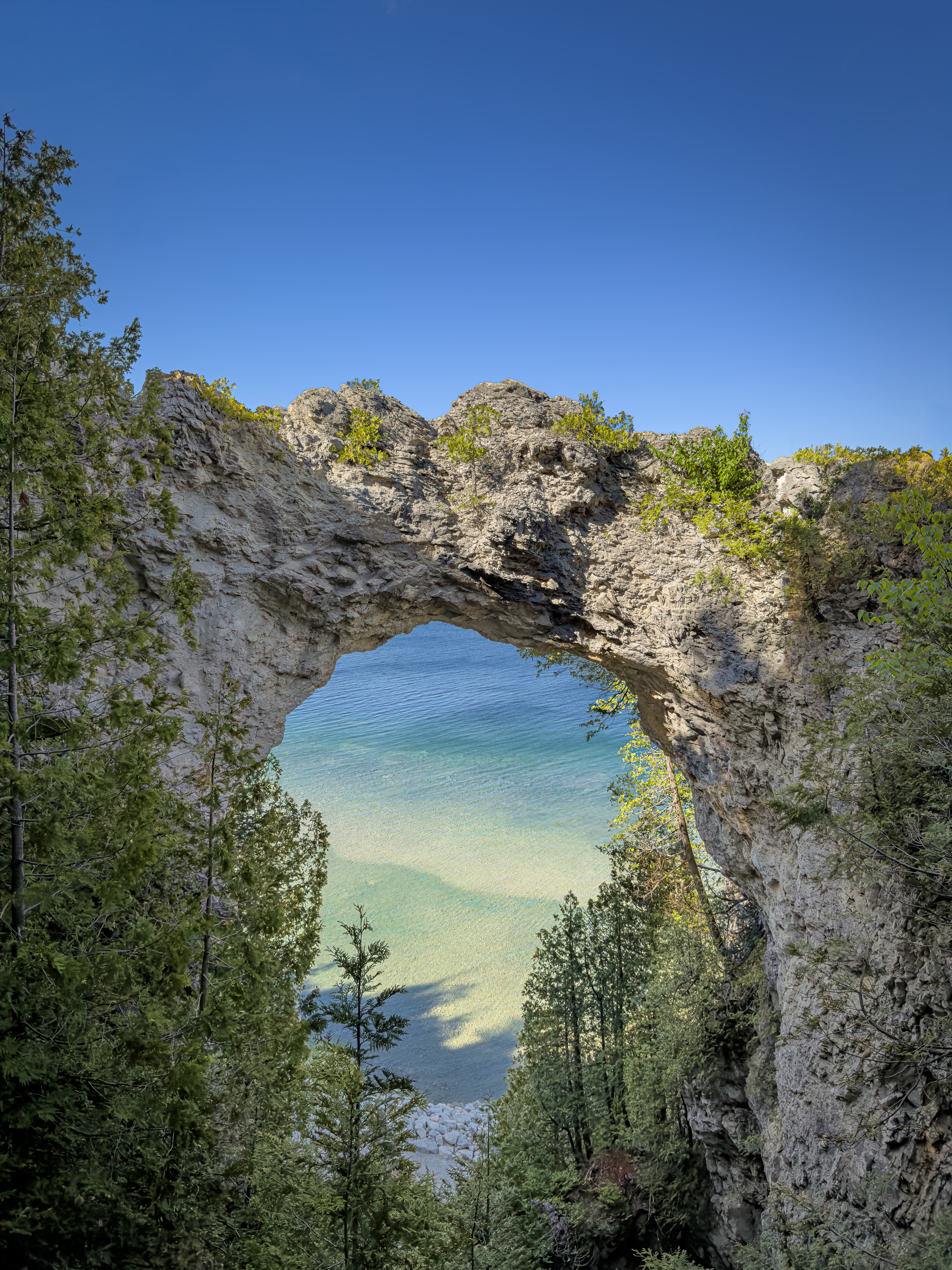
Arch Rock

- Arch Rock
- Gitchi Manitou
- Sugar Loaf
- Cave of the Woods
- Crack-in-the-Island
- Eagle Point Cave
- Skull Cave
- Friendship's Altar
- Sunset Rock (sometimes called Chimney Rock)
- Devil's Kitchen
- Robinson's Folly

== Installations ==
- Anne's Tablet

== Gallery ==
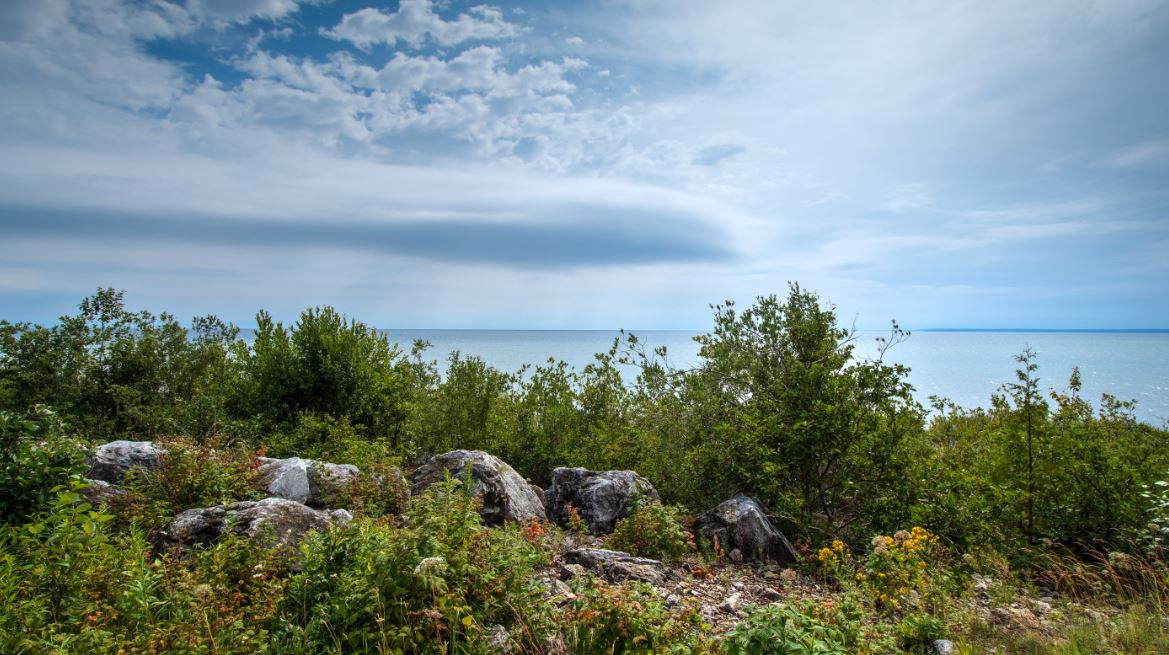
Eastern shore of Mackinac Island, near Mission Point.

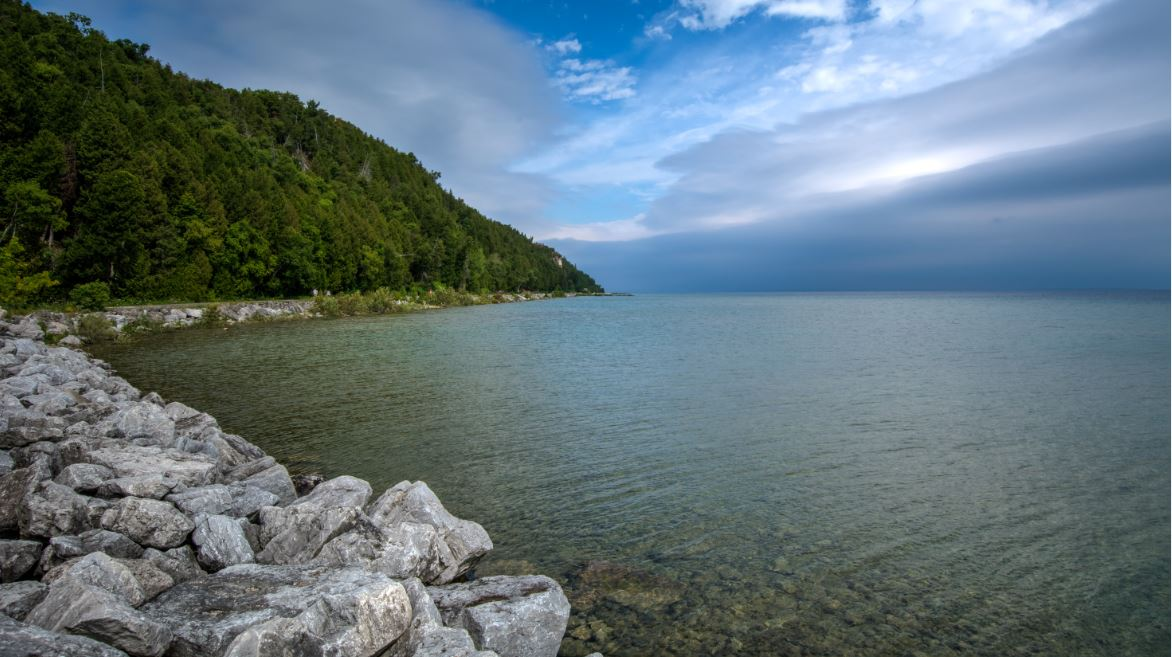
The main biking road around Mackinac Island, eastern shore.

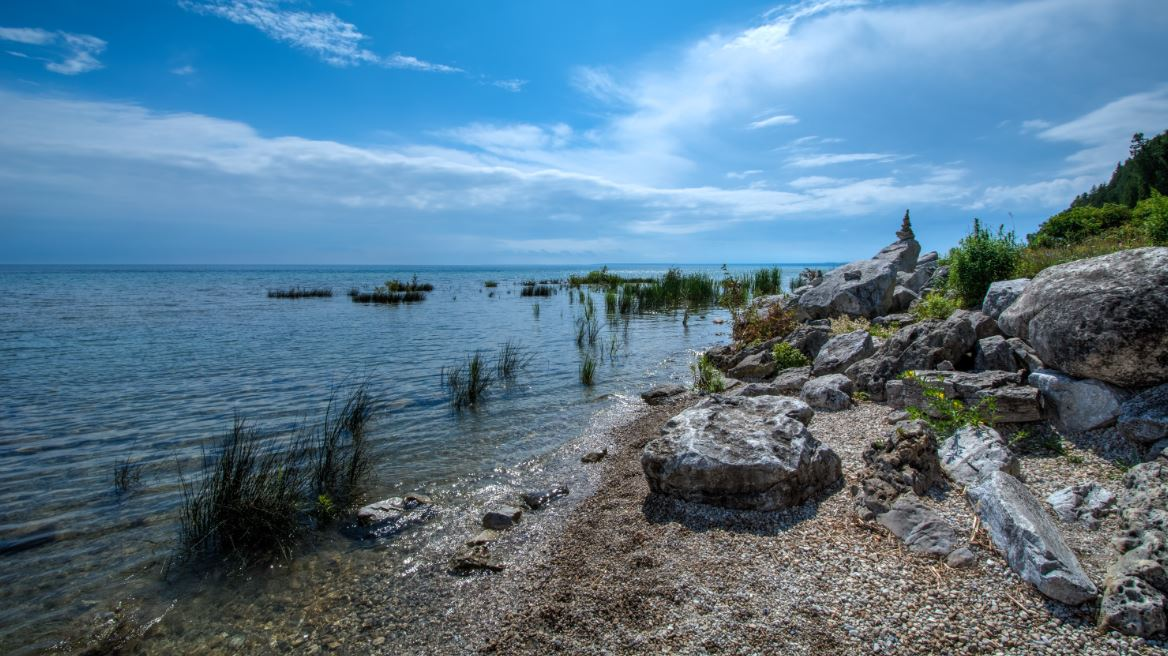
One of many scenic beaches on Mackinac Island.

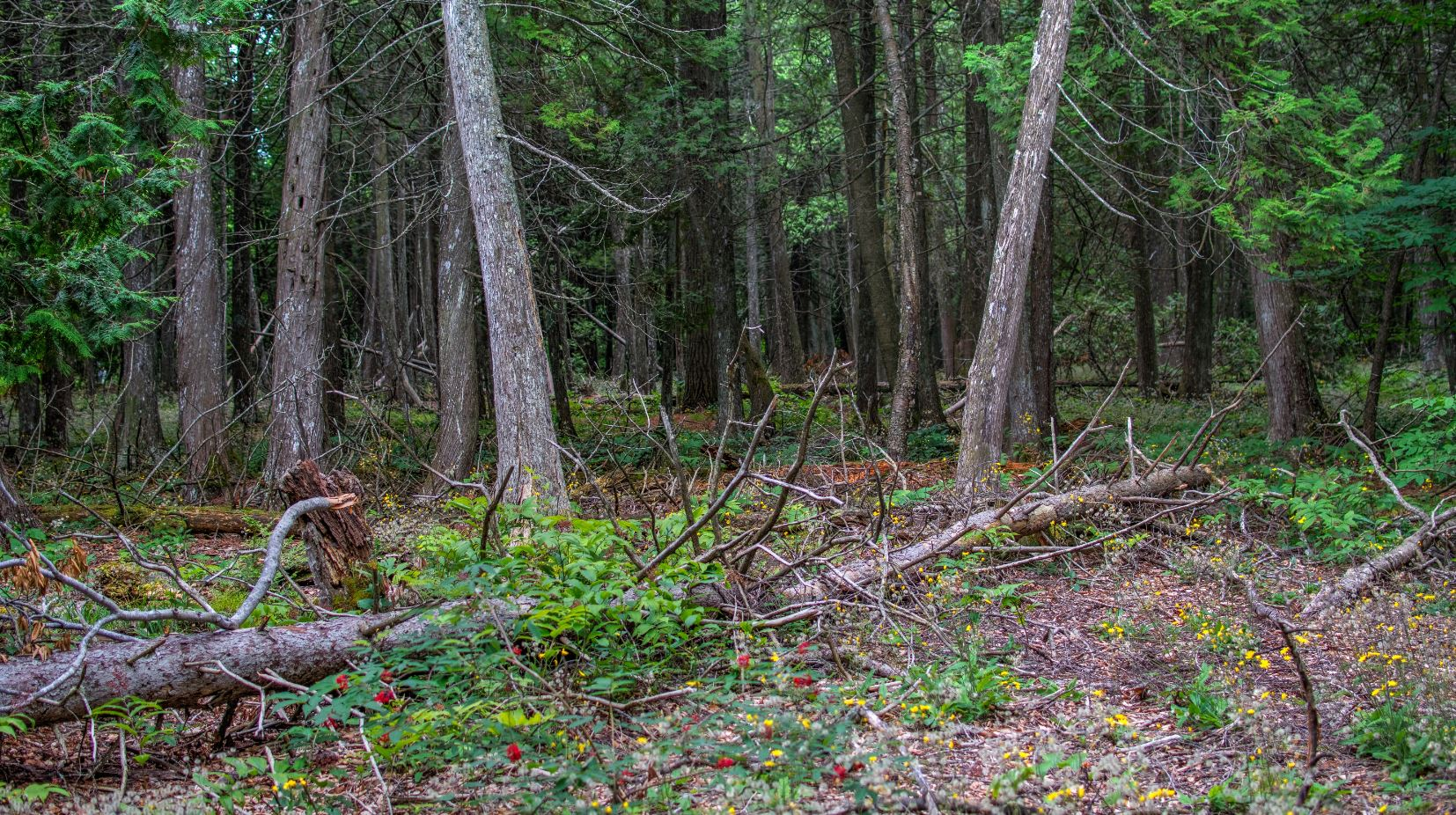
Extensive forests cover the core of Mackinac Island.

== Mackinac State Historic Parks ==
Mackinac State Historic Parks is an agency within the Michigan Department of Natural Resources led by the Mackinac Island State Park Commission. The Parks consist of several parks, museum and other historical areas in the Straits of Mackinac area with the major groups includes Mackinac Island State Park, Michilimackinac State Park and Historic Mill Creek Discovery Park in Mackinaw City.

The agency is governed by the Mackinac Island State Park Commission, a seven-member body. The commissioner are appointed by the governor to six year terms with confirmation by the Michigan Senate.

While a national park, the park was first overseen by the park superintendent, who was also the fort commander. With the military not wanting to fund the park, being non-military, and the National Park Service not formed until 1916, the department approved a revenue plan by a captain at the fort in which choice parcels would be leased to resorters to build summer cottages which started in 1885.

When the park was turned over to the State of Michigan in 1895 to become the first state park, the state legislature established the Mackinac Island State Park Commission to manage the park and its structures.

=== Areas and attractions ===
- Mackinac Island State Park, Mackinac Island
  - Fort Mackinac
  - Historic Downtown Mackinac
    - The Richard and Jane Manoogian Mackinac Art Museum
- Michilimackinac State Park
  - Colonial Michilimackinac
  - Old Mackinac Point Lighthouse
- Dousman's Mill (formerly Historic Mill Creek Discovery Park, Historic Mill Creek State Park and Old Mill Creek State Historic Park), in Mackinaw City
