= Richard and Jane Manoogian Mackinac Art Museum =

- Richard and Jane Manoogian Mackinac Art Museum (listed as Indian Dormitory)
- U.S. National Register of Historic Places
- U.S. National Historic Landmark District – Contributing property
- Michigan State Historic Site
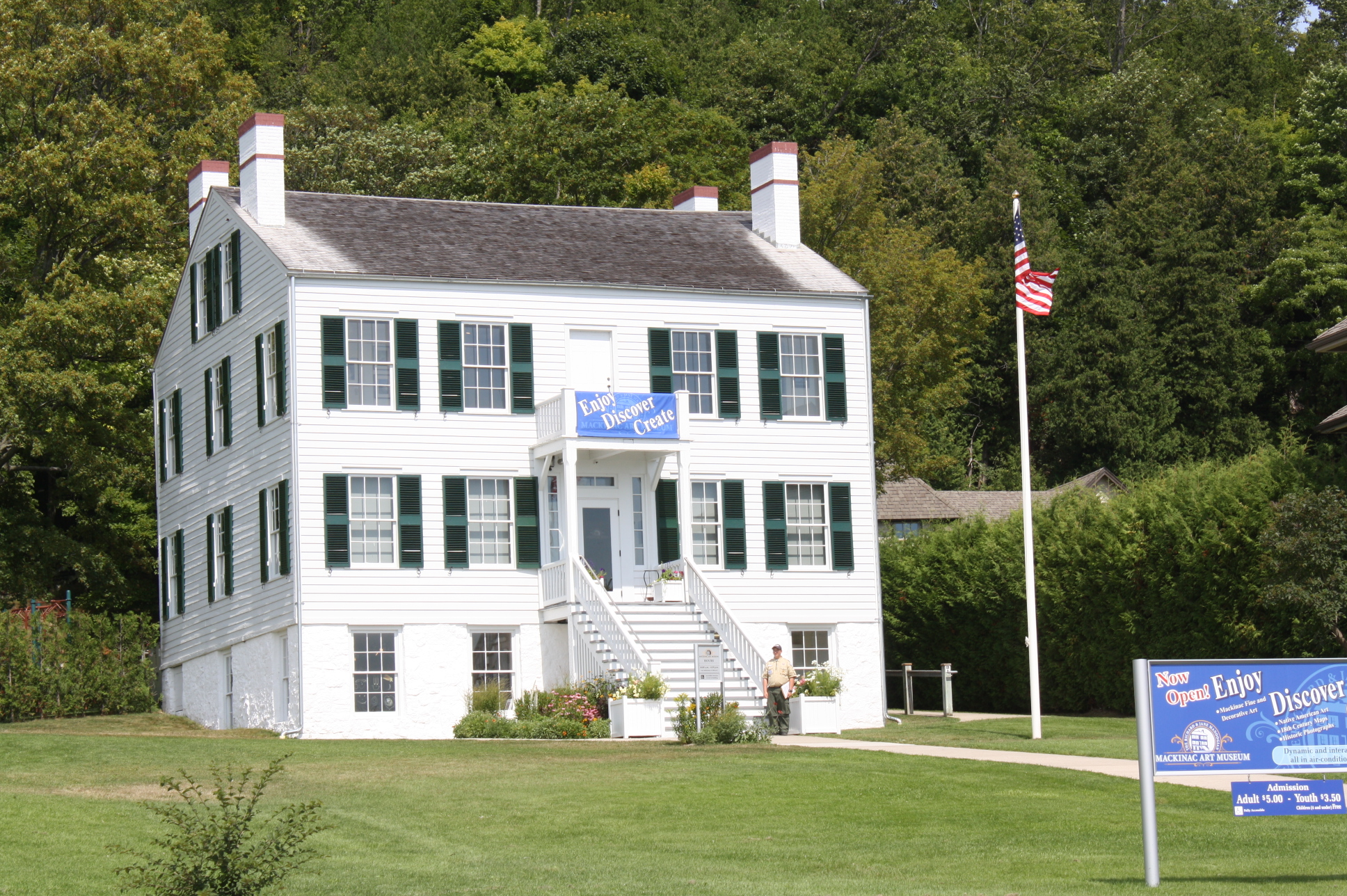
- Indian Dormitory in 2011

- Location within Michigan Location within the United States
- Interactive map
- Location: Huron St., Mackinac Island, Michigan
- Coordinates: 45°51′4″N 84°36′55″W
- Built: 1837
- Architect: Oliver Newberry
- Part of: Mackinac Island (ID66000397)
- NRHP reference No.: 71000408

Significant dates
- Added to NRHP: November 5, 1971
- Designated MSHS: February 17, 1965

The Richard and Jane Manoogian Mackinac Art Museum is an art museum located in the historic Indian Dormitory building on Mackinac Island, Michigan. The museum's exhibits feature art inspired by Mackinac Island, including historic painting and maps, photographs from the mid-19th to the mid-20th century, Native American art and beaded garments, and contemporary art and photography from area artists.

The museum is one of many attractions in Mackinac Island State Park.

== History ==
The Indian Dormitory is a Federal-style structure built at U.S. government expense on Mackinac Island, Michigan, in 1838. It was a pioneering idea in building housing for Native Americans visiting the Indian agency on the island. The local Sons of Temperance chapter, Mackinac Division No. 23 (1847-1851), held weekly meetings there in a rented room in the Indian Dormitory between 1847 and 1848, before moving their meetings to the local Court House. From 1867 until 1960, it was used as a public school, and from 1966 until 2003 as a museum of Native American culture. On July 2, 2010, it opened as the Richard and Jane Manoogian Mackinac Art Museum, operated by Mackinac State Historic Parks. The building is listed on the National Register of Historic Places.

=== Henry Schoolcraft, Indian Agent ===
The Indian Dormitory is a surviving fragment of the assimilationist vision of Henry Schoolcraft, the U.S. government official supervising Native American affairs and based at Mackinac Island. Schoolcraft noticed in the early 19th century that the culture of most Native Americans centered on the hunting and gathering of food, activities which were less productive in terms of food production than agriculture.

Schoolcraft believed that Native Americans could be persuaded to cede much of their hunting lands to the U.S. federal government, and that the government could reinvest some of the proceeds to be earned from reselling these lands to teach farming techniques to "the Indians." Other income from land sales could be used to support Native American families during the transitional period.

As the Indian Agent in Sault Ste. Marie, Michigan, and later on Mackinac Island, Schoolcraft had seen that many of the Native Americans who travelled by foot or canoe to visit his agency were limited by necessity to portable, temporary shelters they could easily build. These did not seem adequate from the European-American point of view.

=== Treaty of Washington, 1836 ===
As the Mackinac Island Indian Agent, Schoolcraft was able to persuade many Native Americans of Michigan Territory, especially members of the Ojibwa and Ottawa tribes, to sell most of the northern Lower Peninsula and eastern Upper Peninsula of Michigan to the federal government. The exchange was sealed in the 1836 Treaty of Washington.

In exchange for the vast tract of land sold, the federal government promised to pay an annuity to affected Native Americans, provide training in farming and allied crafts, such as blacksmithing, and build a dormitory structure on Mackinac Island to which recognized Native Americans with tribal standing could come for shelter when doing business on Mackinac Island with the Indian Agency.

In fulfilment of this promise, the Indian Dormitory was built in 1838.

=== Island schoolhouse ===
After the expiration of the annuity schedule laid out in the 1836 treaty, Native Americans stopped coming to Mackinac Island in large numbers. The Indian Dormitory ceased to be of service in its original function.

In 1867, the building was adapted as a public school for the children of Mackinac Island of all ethnic groups. Serving as a schoolhouse from 1867 to 1960, the Thomas W. Ferry School provided classroom space to one of the most ethnically diverse populations in Michigan.

By 1960, the wooden building could not meet the standards of school safety required by law. The school building, with its Schoolcraft heritage, had long been surrounded by Mackinac Island State Park property, and in 1963 it was purchased by the Park Commission.

=== Building restoration ===
Although Henry R. Schoolcraft's role in American frontier history could be criticized by a later generation as racist, Schoolcraft had a strong interest in the Ojibwa religion, mythology, and culture. Schoolcraft energetically collected local Ojibwa stories and tales, many of which his mixed-race wife Jane Johnston Schoolcraft either told or translated for him. All of his books were published under his name, with little credit to her or her family.

The Massachusetts poet Henry Wadsworth Longfellow studied the Schoolcraft couple's works for themes and inspiration for his epic poem, The Song of Hiawatha. To Americans of European ancestry, this Romantic poem and its title character were authentic windows into the spiritual life of the "American Indian."

In homage to this poem and its sentimental view of Ojibwa culture, in 1964-1965 the Mackinac Island State Park renovated the interior of the Indian Dormitory to serve as a museum of Native American culture and Hiawatha imagery. The exterior was restored to its original 1838 appearance, and the structure was opened to the public in 1966.

== Mackinac Island Art Museum ==
From 1966 until 2003, the Indian Dormitory served as a museum featuring period settings depicting its service as the Indian Dormitory (1838–1846) on its lower levels, and offering an exhibit of Great Lakes Native American culture on the top floor. By the end of this period, the Hiawatha theme was reinterpreted as a classic example of cultural appropriation and, thus, was viewed as no longer appropriate for public use. Schoolcraft and Longfellow had synchretically mashed together images, names, and narratives from different Native American peoples and nations. In 2000 the second-floor exhibit space was closed, and in 2003 the State Park expanded the closure to include the first floor and basement.

After visitation ceased, the State Park carried out a study to plan the structure's future. Mackinac State Historic Parks announced plans in late 2008 to refit and reopen the Indian Dormitory as a museum featuring Straits of Mackinac art and culture. The interior was extensively rebuilt in 2008-2010 to add climate controls suitable for archival preservation of the collection on display. The exterior was restored to reflect the structure's 1838 appearance and function. The structure reopened on July 2, 2010, as the Richard and Jane Manoogian Mackinac Art Museum.

The Indian Dormitory has been added to the National Register of Historic Places, and is a contributing property to Mackinac Island's overall status as a National Historic Landmark.
