= Matthew Geary House =

Historic house in Michigan, United States

- Mathew Geary House
- U.S. National Register of Historic Places
- Michigan State Historic Site
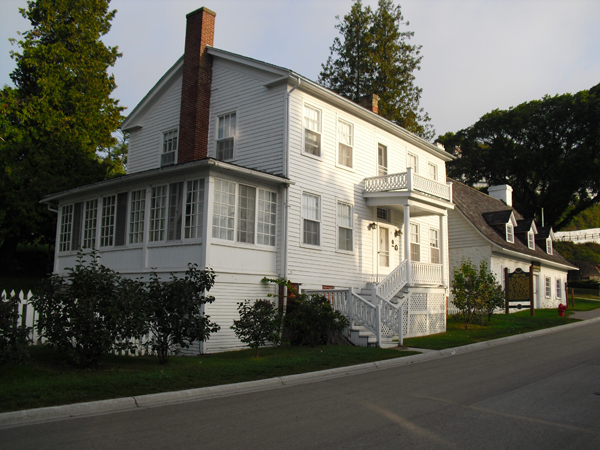
- Mathew Geary House

- Location within Michigan
- Interactive map
- Location: Market St., Mackinac Island, Michigan
- Coordinates: 45°51′2″N 84°37′5″W
- Area: 1 acre (0.40 ha)
- Built: 1846
- NRHP reference No.: 71000407
- Added to NRHP: May 6, 1971

The Matthew Geary House is a wood-framed single family home located at 7248 Market Street in the city of Mackinac Island, Michigan built about 1846.

== History ==
The lot this house stands on was first platted in 1811, and sold to John Ogilvy. The parcel passed through multiple owners in the next few decades, including the American Fur Company, until it was purchased by Matthew Geary (1807–1873) in the mid-1840s. Geary was a prominent citizen of Mackinac Island, having been elected fish inspector for the island. He was also elected as a village trustee in 1848, and held other elective positions on the island. Geary constructed this house in about 1846.

Following Geary's death on March 8, 1873, the house was passed to his family. The Geary House remained in the Geary family until 1968, when it was purchased by the Mackinac Island State Park Commission, the current owner as of 2026. It was listed on the National Register of Historic Places in 1971.

== Description ==
The Matthew Geary House is a two-story, side-gabled frame house with an entrance porch topped with a balustrade and an enclosed side porch. Its raised basement, an architectural response to bedrock close to the surface, is characteristic of traditional Mackinac Island architecture. A rear addition, and the glassed-in side sun porch, are not original to the house. The basement can be accessed via a short flight of steps from the outside of the building.

On the interior, the main floor contains a centran hall and staircase and four surrounding rooms. The kitchen is located in the rear to the east room, and a parlor/bedroom is located in the front to the east. On the west side of the house hall is a large combination living-dining room, and the rear sunporch is located behind this room. The second floor contains four bedrooms, two on either side of the central hall. A bathroom is located at the rear within the two-story addition.
