= Mackinac Island State Park Commission =

Commission overview
- Headquarters: Mackinaw City, Michigan
- Annual budget: $2,950,800
- Commission executive: Steven C. Brisson, Director
- Parent Commission: Michigan Department of Natural Resources
- Website: mackinacparks.com

The Mackinac Island State Park Commission is an appointed board of the State of Michigan that administers state parklands in the Straits of Mackinac area. It is a Type-I Agency under the Michigan Constitution, housed under the Department of Natural Resources. It performs public activities under the name Mackinac State Historic Parks. Park units include Mackinac Island State Park including Fort Mackinac and certain properties within the historic downtown of Mackinac Island, Michigan; Colonial Michilimackinac including Fort Michilimackinac and Old Mackinac Point Lighthouse; and Dousman's Mill (formerly Historic Mill Creek). It is assigned to the Michigan Department of Natural Resources.

Mackinac State Historic Parks is accredited by the American Alliance of Museums. Over one million artifacts are in the collection. which are overseen by a professional curatorial staff. Archeological digs are conducted, and educational opportunities, including lesson plans, are available. The commission maintains the official Michigan Governor's Summer Residence on Mackinac Island and distributes photographs, media kits, brochures and other promotional material.

On July 15, 2009, the Park celebrated its 20 millionth visitor.

== History ==
In its present form, the commission was created by Act 451 of 1994 for the purpose of managing these parks. It is composed of seven members—appointed by the governor with the advice and consent of the State Senate—to serve six-year terms. In fiscal year 2003 the gross appropriation for the Mackinac park system was $2,950,800; $1,037,600 of this amount comes from the Mackinac Island state park fund, while $76,400 was generated from user fees. The state general fund made up the remaining $1,836,800. Some public critics have proposed that the Mackinac Island State Park and the Commission be privatized. Management practices have been deemed effective in years past in independent audits.

The Mackinac Island State Park Commission was created as the governing body of Mackinac State Historic Parks. In 1875, the government land on Mackinac Island, which encompassed 50 percent of the island, was designated the second national park in the United States. In 1895, it was turned over to the state of Michigan, becoming Michigan's first state park. That year, the state legislature created the Mackinac Island State Park Commission to be stewards of the park and its many historic structures. Due to commission efforts, park land now encompasses 80 percent of Mackinac Island, which includes 1,800 acres (7.3 km^{2}). The commission now also manages parks on the mainland. In total, the commission is responsible for a combined 2,500 acres (10 km^{2}) of parkland within Mackinac State Historic Parks, more than 110 buildings and about 1.7 million artifacts.

The chairman of the commission is Daniel Loepp. Other commission members include Elizabeth Dricsoll Boyd, Marlee Brown, Lori Frohoff, Richard Manoogian, Henrick G. (Hank) Meijer, and Phillip Pierce.
