= Dousman's Mill =

State park in Michigan, United States

- formerly Historic Mill Creek State Park
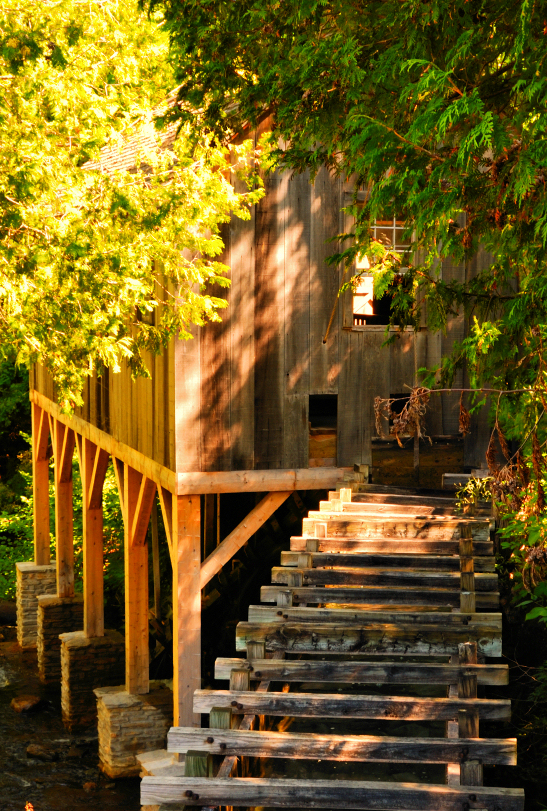
- The historic sawmill

- Location within Michigan Location within the United States
- Location: Mackinaw Township, Cheboygan County, Michigan, United States
- Nearest city: Mackinaw City, Michigan
- Coordinates: 45°44′20″N 84°40′35″W
- Area: 625 acres (253 ha)
- Established: 1984
- Administrator: Michigan Department of Natural Resources; Mackinac Island State Park Commission
- Website: Official website
- Campbell Farm Site
- U.S. National Register of Historic Places
- Michigan State Historic Site
- Area: 6 acres (2.4 ha)
- NRHP reference No.: 78001496

Significant dates
- Added to NRHP: January 31, 1978
- Designated MSHS: March 20, 1984

Dousman's Mill, formerly known as Historic Mill Creek, Historic Mill Creek State Park and Historic Mill Creek Discovery Park, is a state park, nature preserve, and historic site in the U.S. state of Michigan. It is run by Mackinac State Historic Parks, the operating arm of the various historic parks in the Mackinac Straits area, including Mackinac Island State Park. It is 625 acres (253 ha) in size, and the park is located five miles (8.0 km) southeast of Mackinaw City on U.S. Highway 23.

== History ==
The original sawmill at Mill Creek operated from about 1790 until 1839. It was originally built by Robert Campbell to supply lumber to the Straits of Mackinac, especially the frontier settlement of Mackinac Island. In 1793 it contracted with Fort Mackinac to make repairs on the soldiers' barracks. The Mill Creek sawmill enjoyed a dominant market share of the supply of cut timbers in the Straits of Mackinac during the fur trade era, and a millwright's house was built about 1820 near the sawmill to provide a place for the mill operator to live. In 1819, Michael Dousman purchased the mill site and continued to operate it. However, global demand for beaver fur declined in the 1830s, and no documentation indicates the sawmill operated after 1839. following Dousman's death in 1854 the sawmill and millwright's house were abandoned.

After the sawmill's abandonment in 1839, the original sawmill complex buildings rotted and disappeared. However, timbers cut by the original mill survived in buildings on Mackinac Island (Mission Church and Mission House, built in the 1820s and still there today). Saw marks on these timbers could be used to reconstruct the mill machinery so as to closely resemble the original. The marks gave restoration experts information on the rake of the saw's teeth and the saw's operating speed. In the reconstructed sawmill, the wood is fed into the blade at 1/3 inch (8.5 mm) per stroke, and the infeed motion is powered by the pitman arm that powers the saw's vertical movement.

Archaeological investigations were conducted at the site of the sawmill in the 1970s. The dig site was variously called the "Filbert Site," the "Mill Creek Site", or the "Campbell Farm Site", and was designated 20CN8. In September 2025, the site was renamed once again to Dousman's Mill in honor of the operator of the mill from 1819 to 1839.

== Dousman's Mill today ==
Mill Creek drains the Dingman Marsh, a perched wetland within Mackinaw State Forest in northwest Cheboygan County. The park includes approximately one mile (1.6 km) of the eponymous creek's watercourse as it flows downhill toward Lake Huron, but not the wetland. The creek dam and sawmill (c. 1790) were rebuilt in 1984; the sawmill was restored in part for the 2007 season. The Workshop (c. 1820) was rebuilt around 1994 on the site of the original. The millwright's house (c. 1820) was rebuilt in 2005. Several active-based attractions added to the park during its "Historic Mill Creek Discovery Park" days, such as a zip line, have been removed, reverting the site back to primarily historical interpretation, its original purpose.

== Activities and amenities ==
The park offers 3.5 miles (5.6 km) of nature trails, 1.5 miles (2.4 km) of which is handicapped-accessible.

In summer, costumed interpreters use antique woodworking tools to make shingles, demonstrate a variety of other tasks common in the 1820s, and oversee the operation of the sawpit and sawmill. A naturalist conducts talks on the animal and plant species of the nearby forested areas.

The North Central State Trail serves Dousman's Mill.
