= Fort Mackinac =

- U.S. National Register of Historic Places
- Michigan State Historic Site
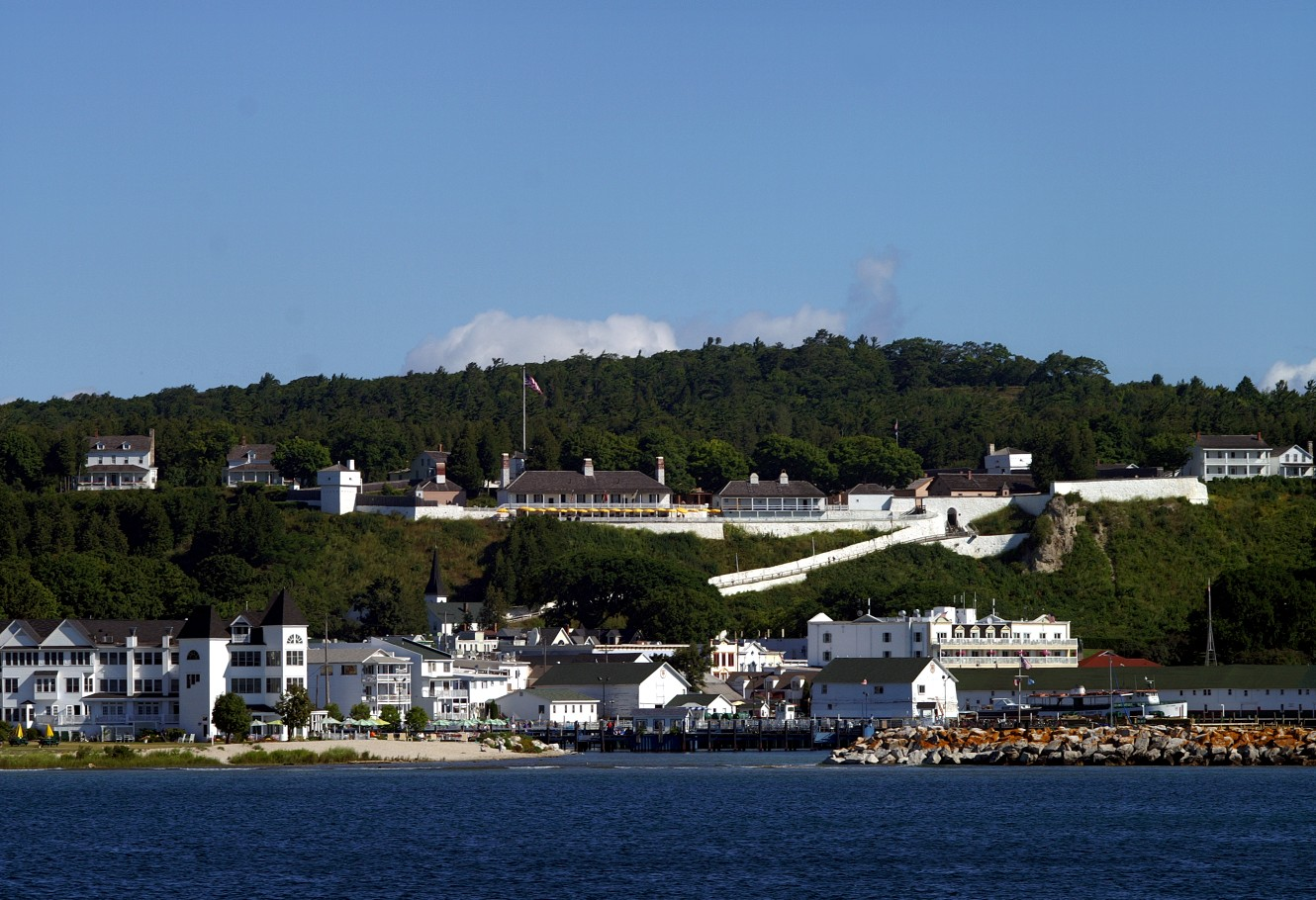
- Fort Mackinac

- Location within Michigan Location within the United States
- Interactive map
- Location: Huron Rd., Mackinac Island, Michigan
- Coordinates: 45°51′8″N 84°37′2″W
- Built: 1782
- NRHP reference No.: 70000280

Significant dates
- Added to NRHP: October 31, 1966
- Designated: June 9, 1960
- Designated MSHS: February 19, 1958

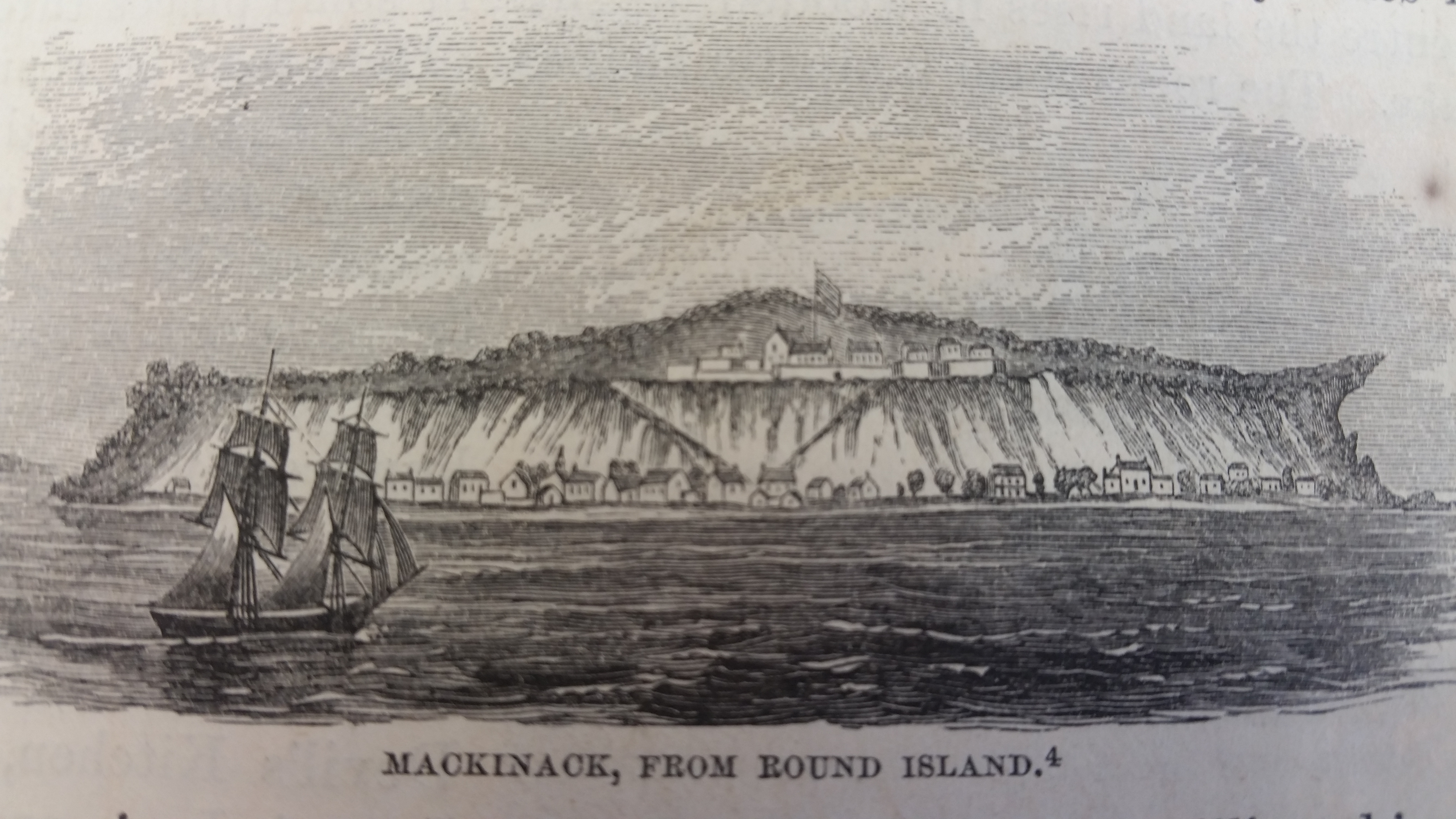
Fort Mackinack

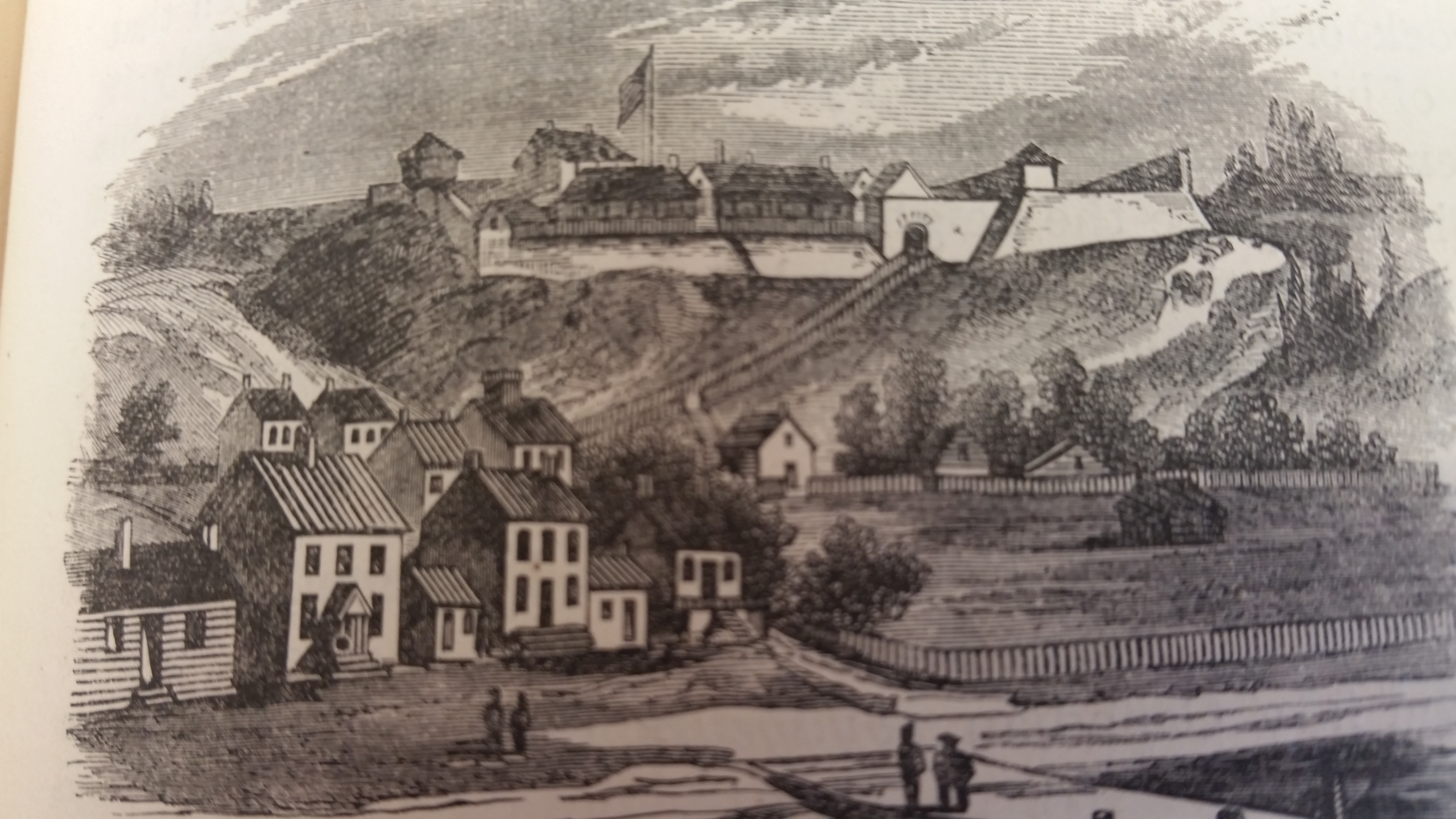
Fort Mackinack

Fort Mackinac (/ˈmækənɔː/ MAK-ə-naw) is a former British and American military outpost garrisoned from the late 18th century to the late 19th century in the city of Mackinac Island, Michigan, on Mackinac Island. The British built the fort during the American Revolutionary War to control the strategic Straits of Mackinac between Lake Michigan and Lake Huron, and by extension the fur trade on the Great Lakes. The British did not relinquish the fort until thirteen years after the end of the American Revolutionary War. Fort Mackinac later became the scene of two strategic battles for control of the Great Lakes during the War of 1812. During most of the 19th century, it served as an outpost of the United States Army. Closed in 1895, the fort has been adapted as a museum on the grounds of Mackinac Island State Park.

== History ==
=== American Revolutionary War ===
Before 1763, the French used Fort Michilimackinac on the mainland south shore of the Straits of Mackinac to control the area. After the Treaty of Paris (1763), the British occupied the French fort but considered the wooden structure too difficult to defend. In 1780/1781, its lieutenant governor Patrick Sinclair constructed a new limestone fort on the 150-foot (46 m) limestone bluffs of Mackinac Island above the Straits of Mackinac. The British held the outpost throughout the American Revolutionary War. Captain Daniel Robertson commanded the garrison on Mackinac Island from 1782 to his replacement in 1784 by Lieutenant George Clowes. Despite the terms of the Treaty of Paris (1783), the British did not officially relinquish the fort to the United States until the Jay Treaty was ratified in 1796.

=== War of 1812 ===
In June 1812, British Major-General Isaac Brock heard that America had declared war and sent a canoe party to Fort St. Joseph, Ontario to confirm that a state of war existed. This party returned with an order to attack Fort Mackinac, then known as Fort Michilimackinac.

A minimal United States garrison of approximately sixty men under the command of Lieutenant Porter Hanks then manned Fort Mackinac. Although a diligent officer, Hanks had received no communication from his superiors for months. On the morning of July 17, 1812, a combined British and Native American force of seventy war canoes and ten bateaux under the command of British Captain Charles Roberts attacked Fort Mackinac. Roberts came from Fort St. Joseph and landed on the north end of Mackinac Island, 2 miles (3.2 km) from the fort. The British removed the village inhabitants from their homes and trained their two 6-pounder iron cannons at the fort. The Americans, under Lieutenant Hanks, were taken by surprise and Hanks perceived his garrison was badly outnumbered. The officers and men under Roberts numbered about two hundred (including 180 Canadians); a few hundred Native Americans of various tribes supported him.

Fearing that the Native Americans on the British side would massacre his men and allies, Lieutenant Hanks accepted the British offer of surrender without a fight. The British paroled the American forces, essentially allowing them to go free after swearing to not take up arms in the war again. They made the island inhabitants swear an oath of allegiance as subjects of the United Kingdom.

Shortly after the British captured the fort, two American vessels arrived from Fort Dearborn (Chicago), unaware of the start of the War of 1812, or the fort's capture by British forces. The British raised the American flag and when the vessels tied up at the pier, the British captured the two sloops as prizes of war. The ships were Erie (Captain Norton) and Friends Good Will (Captain Lee), the latter being taken by the British into service as HMS Little Belt. The schooners Mary and Salina, anchored at port, were sent by the British to Detroit as cartels carrying the prisoners they had taken.

After capturing the island, the British under the command of Colonel Robert McDouall of the Royal Newfoundland Regiment built Fort George, a stockade and blockhouse on the highest point of the island, to prevent the Americans from re-capturing the island using the same strategy. Lieutenant Hanks made his way to Detroit and the American military post there. Upon his arrival, superiors charged him with cowardice in the surrender of Fort Mackinac. Before the court martial of Lieutenant Hanks could begin, British forces attacked Fort Detroit. A British cannonball ripped through the room where Hanks was standing, cutting him in half and killing the officer next to him as well.

United States Army Colonel George Croghan and his superior General William Henry Harrison designed a campaign to take control of the Great Lakes and sever the fur trade alliance between the British and the tribes of the region; as part of this campaign, the Americans attempted to retake Mackinac Island in July 1814. The two-pronged campaign also included an assault on Prairie du Chien, Wisconsin, located on the upper Mississippi River.

=== Battle of Mackinac Island (1814) ===
On July 26, 1814, a squadron of five United States ships arrived off Mackinac Island, carrying a landing force of 700 soldiers under the command of Colonel Croghan. This landing began the Battle of Mackinac Island. To his dismay, Colonel Croghan discovered that the new British blockhouse stood too high for the naval guns to reach, forcing an unprotected assault on the wall of Fort George. The Americans shelled Fort George for two days with most shells falling harmlessly in vegetable gardens around the fort.

A dense fog forced the Americans back from Mackinac Island for a week. Major Andrew Holmes led the American forces in returning; they landed at the north end of the island near the location of the British assault in 1812. The Americans worked their way to the fort through dense woods, which Native American allies of the British protected, finally emerging into a clearing below Fort George.

Colonel McDouall had placed a small force bearing muskets, rifles, and two field guns behind low breastworks at the opposite end of the clearing. When the Americans emerged from the woods into the clearing, the British guns targeted them easily. British forces killed 13 Americans, including Major Holmes and two other officers, and wounded 51 others. The heavy losses compelled Colonel Croghan to order his men to retreat back through the woods to the beach. The Americans rowed back to their ships and retreated.

The American defeat in the Battle of Mackinac Island left the island and its forts in the hands of the British through the end of the War of 1812. Following the Treaty of Ghent, American forces reoccupied Fort Mackinac in July 1815. They renamed Fort George as Fort Holmes, in honor of Major Holmes, killed in the 1814 attack. After the War of 1812 and settlement of the northern border and tensions with Britain, Fort Mackinac gradually declined in military significance.

=== Later years ===
No longer needed as a front line border defense against the British in Canada, the fort was used as a strategic troop reserve. The Army essentially could deploy troops to Fort Mackinac until a need arose to transfer them to other locations of military importance. The Army nearly abandoned Fort Mackinac between such uses. It was also used as a fur trading post, as Mackinac Island was an important fur post. From 1816 to 1821 the post was commanded by Benjamin Kendrick Pierce, the older brother of President Franklin Pierce. He married the daughter of Magdelaine Laframboise, a prominent fur trader of Ojibwe and French descent.

On June 6, 1822, a fur trader named Alexis St. Martin waited to trade in his furs when a gun accidentally discharged just inches from him, blowing a hole in his abdomen. The post surgeon, Doctor William Beaumont, attended to him. Dr. Beaumont cared for the presumably doomed St. Martin the best he could. To his surprise, the man appeared to make a recovery. Beaumont took St. Martin into his home, caring for him for several years. St. Martin healed although his stomach had a hole. Beaumont seized the opportunity and began observing and conducting experiments on the man. Through these experiments, Beaumont described the process of digestion in detail, unlocking its mysteries. Beaumont wrote a book about his experiments and later became known as "The Father of Gastric Physiology."

The fort developed as an important staging area for US exploration of the northern Michigan Territory, including the expedition in 1820 under the command of Lewis Cass to explore the headwaters of the Mississippi River. Henry Rowe Schoolcraft held the post of United States Indian agent at Fort Mackinac for a time in the 1830s. He did extensive study of the Native American languages and culture of the region, aided by his marriage to Jane Johnston, the Ojibwe-British daughter of John Johnston, a wealthy British fur trader at Sault Ste. Marie. Both her parents' families were prominent among the elite of the region.

During the Mexican–American War and for long periods during the Civil War, the Army left the care and upkeep of Fort Mackinac to an ordnance sergeant. Despite these periods of relative inactivity, the fort played a small role in the Civil War, briefly used as a prison for three Confederate political prisoners. Brought to Mackinac Island and the fort during the summer months, these three men enjoyed relative freedom, guarded only by a volunteer militia. When faced with the prospect of enduring a long, harsh winter on the island, two of the prisoners signed loyalty oaths and obtained release. The third Confederate refused, and the Army ultimately transferred him to another post.

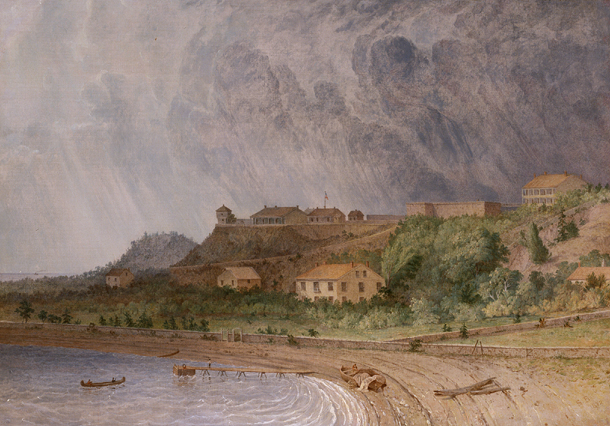
Fort Mackinac, Michigan by Seth Eastman

Seth Eastman, an officer and artist in the United States Army, in 1872 made an oil painting of Fort Mackinac, as a commission by the US Congress of paintings of military forts. It is now part of the collection of the United States Senate. His more important work was to illustrate Henry Rowe Schoolcraft's six-volume history of the American Indians, commissioned by Congress in the 1850s.

=== Mackinac National Park ===
Map of Mackinac Island showing the state park boundaries

From 1875 to 1895, Mackinac National Park, the second national park in the United States after Yellowstone National Park, included Fort Mackinac and much of Mackinac Island. During the national park years, the troops stationed at Mackinac acted as park caretakers.

To improve conditions and boost morale, the Army constructed a bathhouse at the fort (in which every man at the fort was required to bathe at least once a week), a post toilet (complete with flush toilets), and a post canteen (where the men could read current magazines, play pool, and buy beer and wine). They wanted Fort Mackinac to be a "desirable station." Soldiers also had regular military duties, drilling on the parade ground and taking target practice at least once a week on either a 600- or 1000-yard rifle range. The skills learned at the fort later proved important for many troops who were posted at other locations in the still-dangerous American West.

== Decommissioning ==
=== State administration ===
In 1895, Congress closed Fort Mackinac and Mackinac National Park. It transferred the fort and park to the State of Michigan, which created Mackinac Island State Park, the first state park in Michigan. The semi-autonomous Mackinac Island State Park Commission in 1895 began governing Fort Mackinac and the other surrounding historic sites on or near Mackinac Island: Colonial Michilimackinac, Dousman's Mill (formerly Historic Mill Creek), the Old Mackinac Point Lighthouse, and Mackinac Island State Park. The Governor of Michigan appoints members of the commission, who meet many times during the course of a year to govern Mackinac State Historic Parks. The commission and historic parks preserve, protect, and present the rich and natural history of Mackinac Island and the Straits area.

In the 1950s, Mackinac Island State Park Commission developed a new way of financing its park, based on the system that financed the Mackinac Bridge. Michigan financed construction of Mackinac Bridge through revenue bonds repaid from the cash flow of toll fees from the bridge after it opened in 1957. Mackinac Island State Park Commission modified this idea for park restoration purposes, with Fort Mackinac admission fees serving as the cash flow. More than three-fourths of budget of Mackinac Island State Park Commission now comes from admission fees and other self-generated cash flow. Most United States parks-and-recreation agencies instead depend upon public subsidies. Mackinac Island State Park Commission operates one of the largest parks in United States that generates a significant majority of its own operating budget.

=== Fort Mackinac today ===
The current museum at the park includes 14 historic buildings.

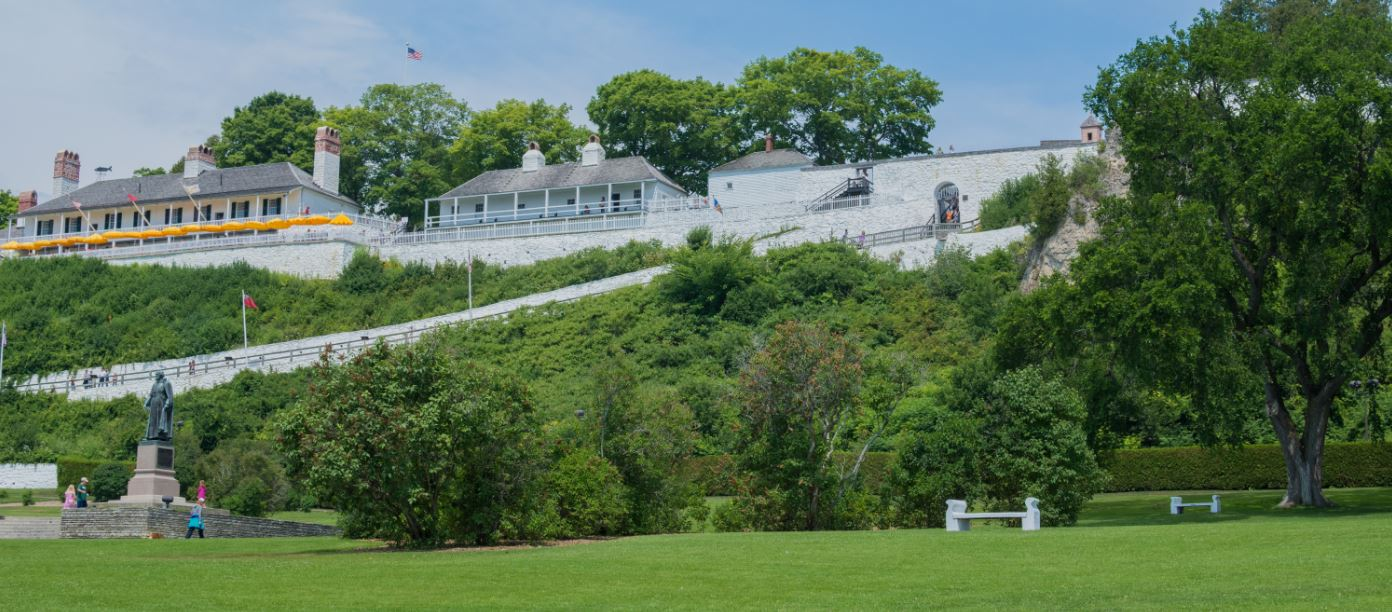
Fort Mackinac, high up on the limestone bluffs overlooking the main town on Mackinac Island

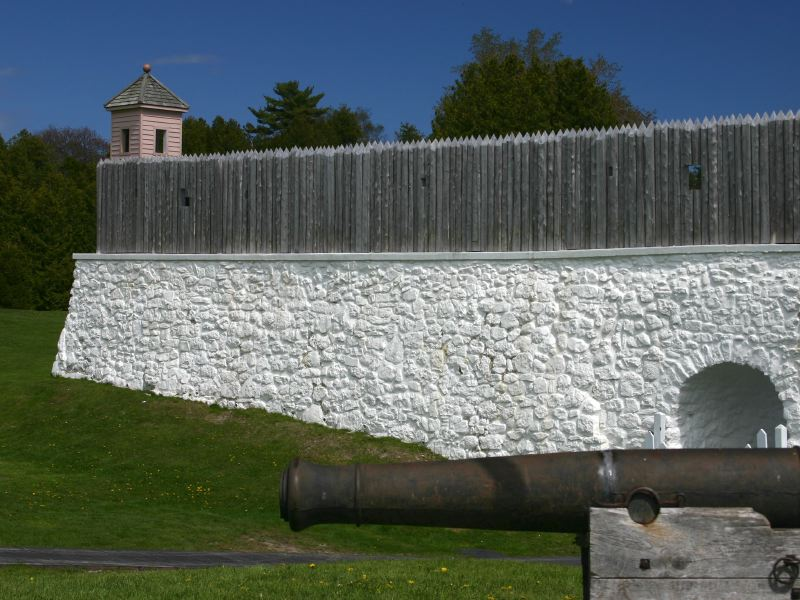
Fort Mackinac, 2004

Today, Fort Mackinac is a popular heritage tourist destination. Situated on 150-foot bluffs above the Straits of Mackinac, it is one of the few surviving American Revolutionary War forts and one of the most complete early forts in the country. In 2015, Fort Mackinac celebrated 235 years standing guard over Mackinac Island.

During the main tourism summer months (June through August), visitors ascend into a bustle of activity within the old British-built stone walls of old Fort Mackinac after entering its weathered gates. Costumed interpreters greet visitors, portray life in the 1880s, answer questions, pose for pictures, and lead tours throughout the day. Some of the "soldiers" carry original 45-70 Springfield Model 1873, the type used at the fort during the 1880s. Others play music or greet and mingle with the crowds of visitors.

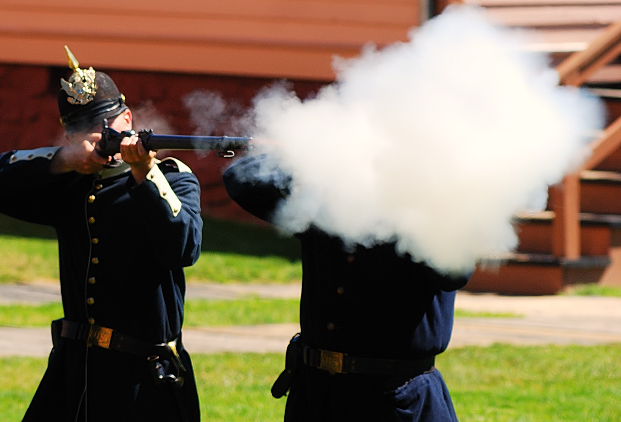
"Soldier" Firing a Springfield Model 1873 Rifle at Fort Mackinac

The 1841 model six-pounder is fired many times daily. It is the second-largest cannon regularly demonstrated on the Great Lakes. Activities also include rifle firings, discussions about the uniforms and equipment worn by soldiers, and demonstrations of both guard mounting and dress parade ceremonies.

=== Extant buildings ===
There are 14 original buildings as part of the fort museum:

1. Commissary Building: Once used for food storage; today houses the Museum Store.
2. Office: Used for the paymaster and offices.
3. Quartermaster's Storehouse: Held any and all equipment needed by the soldiers during the Fort's history.
4. Post Bathhouse: The newest building, built in 1885, housing 6 baths for the soldiers' comfort.
5. Soldiers Barracks: Used to house the nearly 100 soldiers stationed there.
6. Reading Room: Provided a lending library and education for soldiers.
7. Hill Quarters: Many lieutenants lived in these officers' quarters. Rank was rewarded.
8. Post Hospital: Where the post doctor/surgeon treated patients until a new hospital was built in 1860.
9. Officer's Stone Quarters: Michigan's oldest building (1780), used to house officers. Today holds the Kids Quarters and the Tea Room.
10. Wood Quarters: Used for various purposes over the life of the building, including officers' quarters and a post canteen that served Schlitz beer, but no whiskey.
11. Post Guardhouse: Central headquarters and break room for the guard detail, housing a prison cell in the back.
12-14: North, East, and West Blockhouses: Stone towers built by the first Americans garrisoning Fort Mackinac.

== See also ==
- Mackinaw jacket, created at Fort Mackinac in 1812.
