= Mackinac Island, Michigan =

Historic resort community on a Michigan island

- City
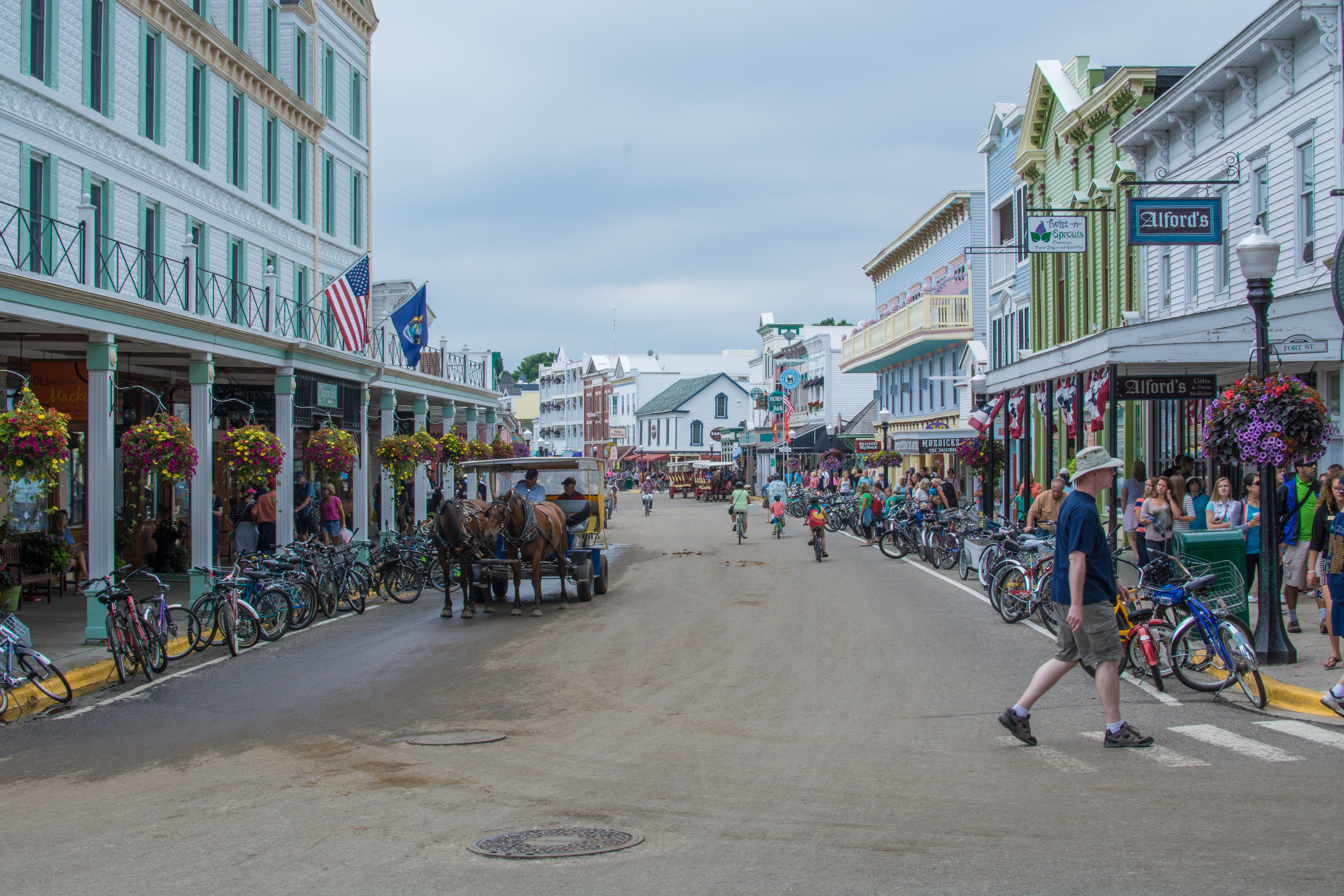
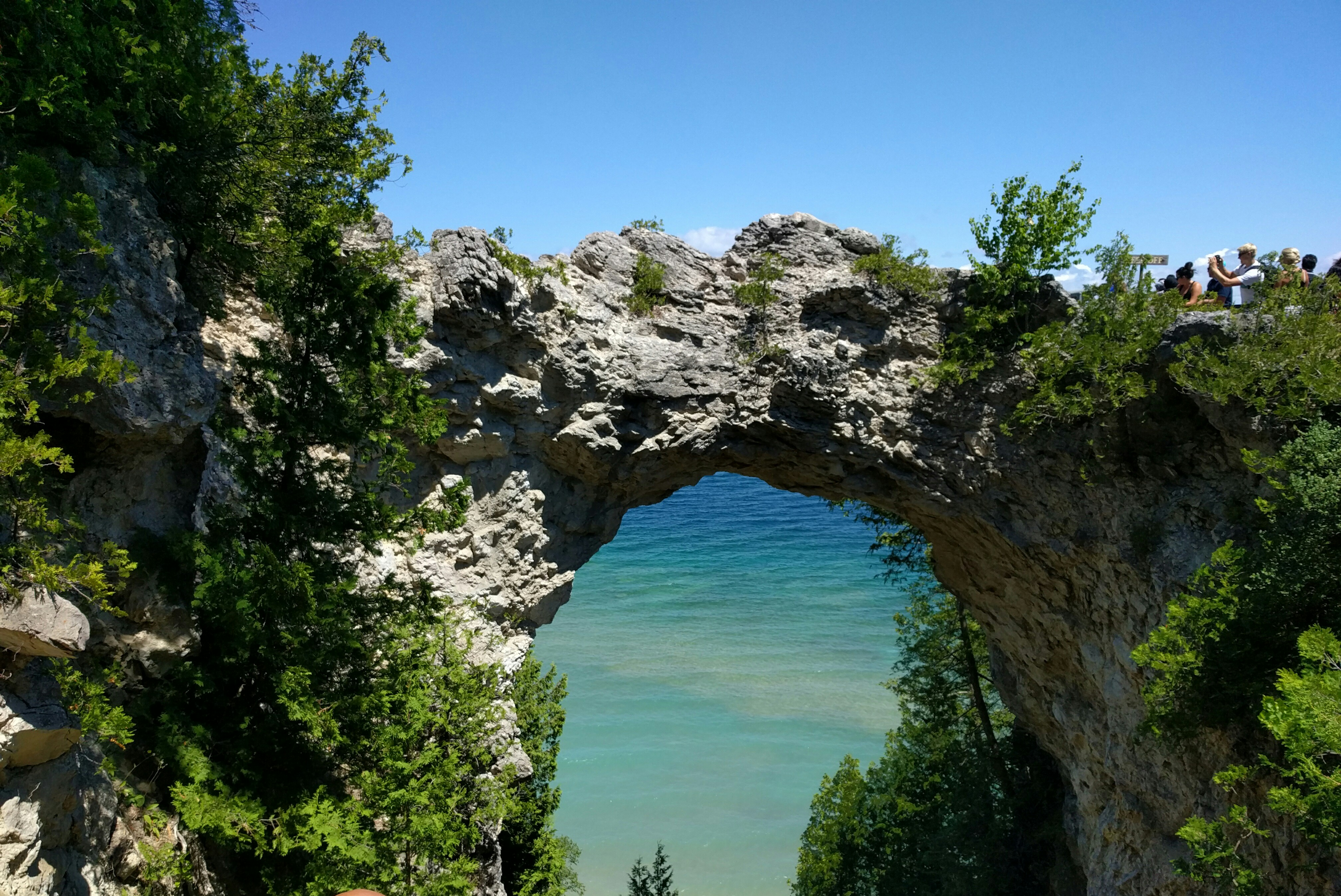
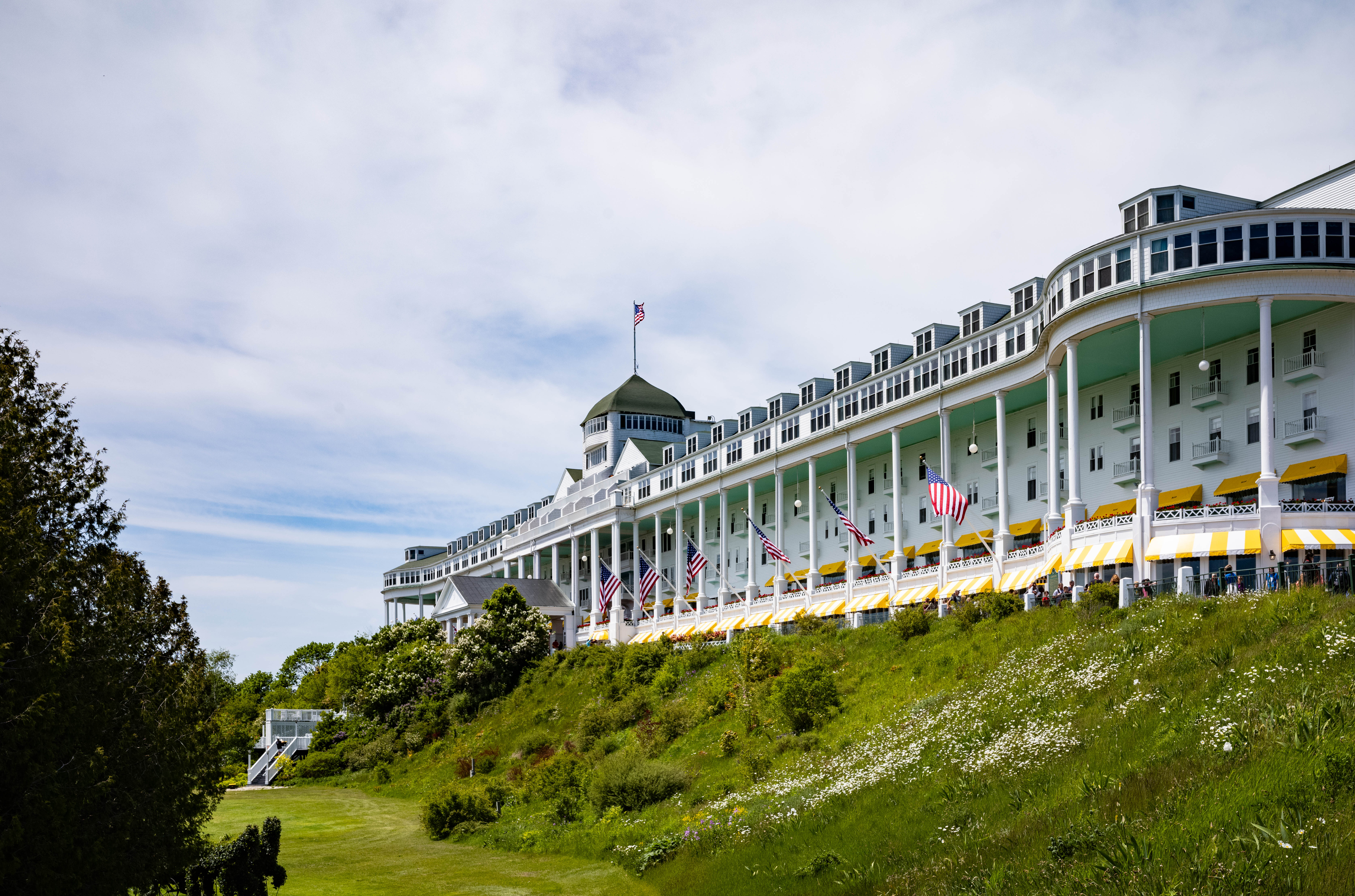
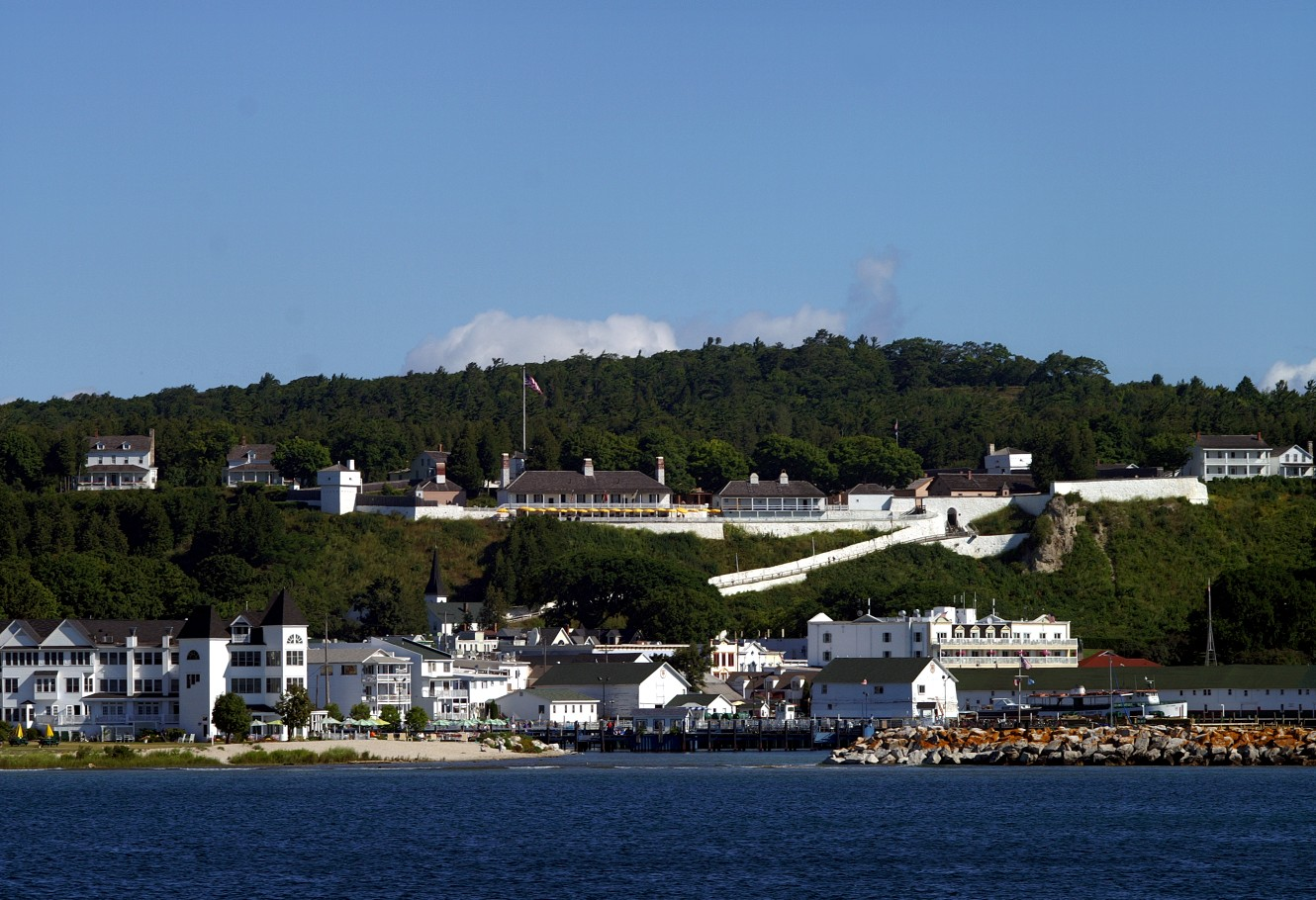
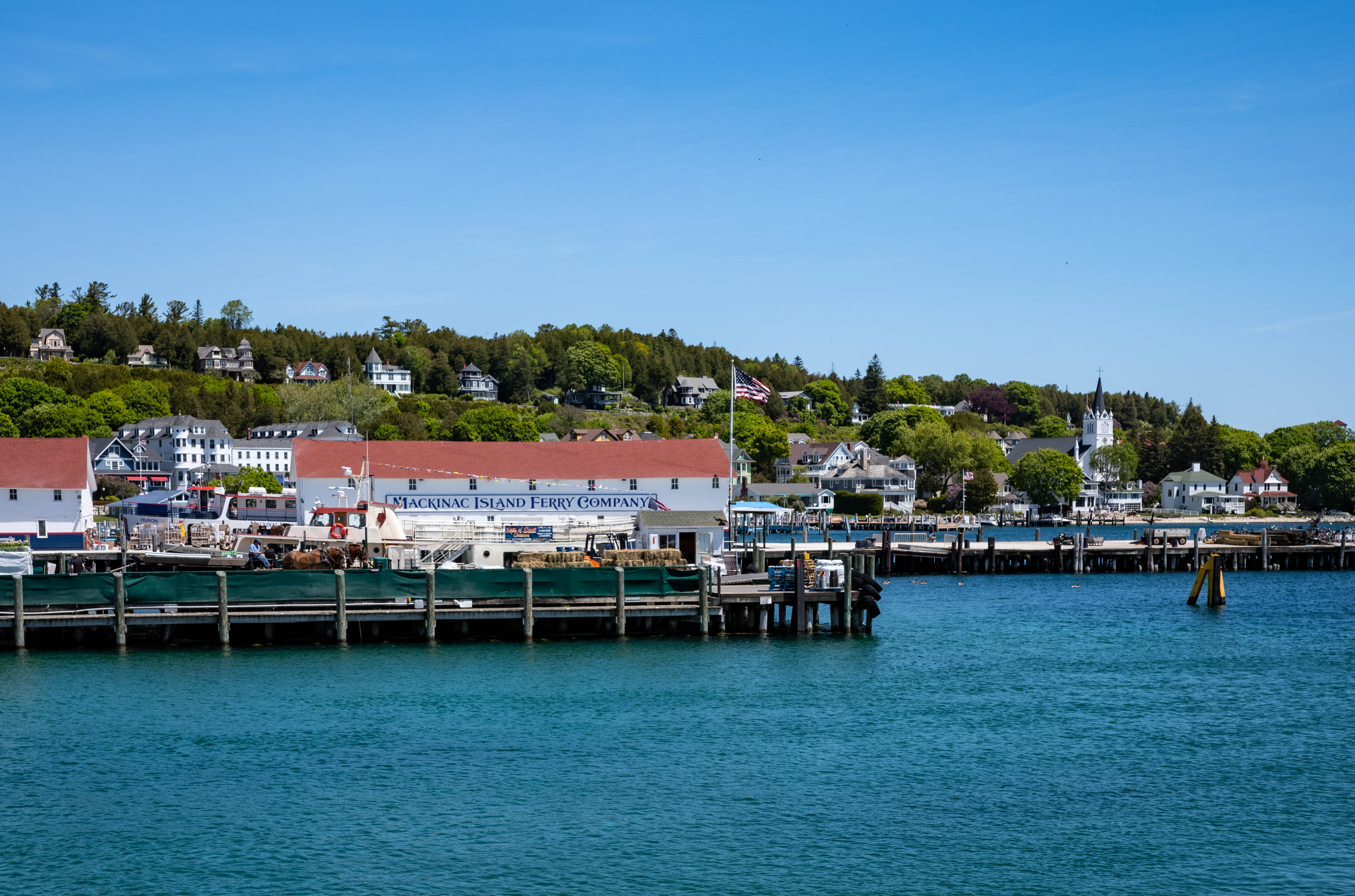
- Downtown Mackinac Island Arch Rock Grand Hotel Fort Mackinac State Harbor

- Flag

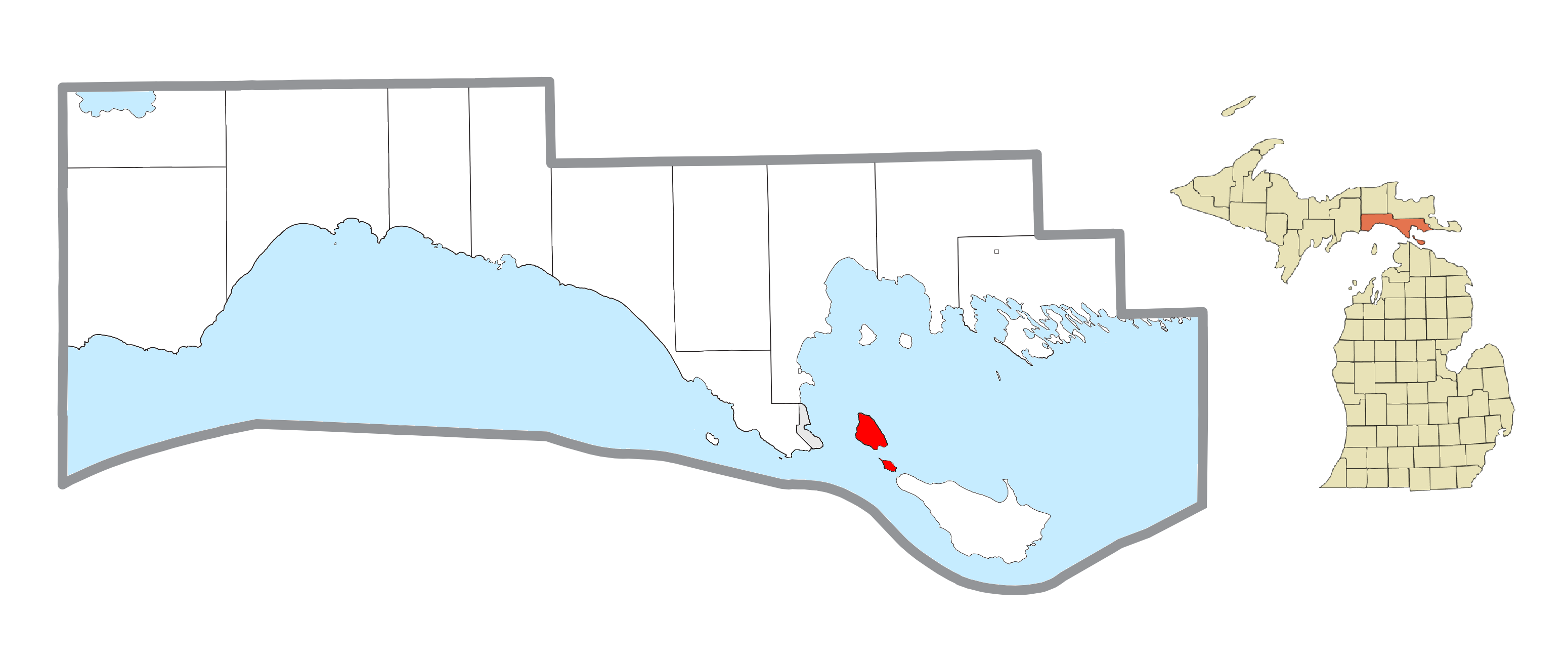
- Location within Mackinac County, Michigan

- Location within the state of Michigan Location within the United States
- Coordinates: 45°52′50″N 84°37′23″W
- Country: United States
- State: Michigan
- County: Mackinac
- Settled: 1671; 355 years ago
- Established: February 2, 1817; 209 years ago (borough)
- Incorporated: March 25, 1847; 179 years ago (village); March 20, 1900; 126 years ago (city)

Government
  - Type: Mayor–council
  - Mayor: Margaret M. Doud

Area
  - Total: 18.84 sq mi (48.80 km^{2})
  - Land: 4.35 sq mi (11.27 km^{2})
  - Water: 14.49 sq mi (37.53 km^{2}) 76.91%
- Elevation: 787 ft (240 m)

Population (2020)
  - Total: 583
  - Density: 134.0/sq mi (51.75/km^{2})
- Time zone: UTC-5 (EST)
  - Summer (DST): UTC-4 (EDT)
- ZIP code: 49757
- Area code: 906
- FIPS code: 26-50280
- GNIS feature ID: 1626654
- Website: cityofmi.org

Mackinac Island (/ˈmækənɔː/ MAK-ə-naw, locally /ˈmækənə/ MAK-ə-nə) is a city in Mackinac County in the U.S. state of Michigan. The population was 583 in the 2020 census.

The city was established as an important fur trading center in the 18th century. In its early period, Mackinac Island a predominantly French-speaking population of French Canadians and Métis. After the War of 1812, the US restricted participation of non-citizens in the fur industry, and the city attracted more Anglo-American residents. From 1818 until 1882, the city served as the county seat of the former Michilimackinac County, which was later organized as Mackinac County, with St. Ignace designated as the county seat. The city includes all of Mackinac Island as well as nearby Round Island, which is unpopulated, federally owned, and part of the Hiawatha National Forest. The state park and the national forest make up most of the city.

A unique local ordinance passed in 1895 prohibits the use of any motor vehicles on the island. The only exceptions to this are city emergency vehicles (ambulance, police cars and fire trucks), city service vehicles, and snowmobiles in the winter. Today, the most common means of travel are by foot, bicycle, horse, or horse-drawn carriage. Roller skates and roller blades are also allowed, except in the downtown area. Mackinac Island is home to the Grand Hotel, built during the late nineteenth century when the island became a summer destination for tourists. When the 1980 movie Somewhere in Time was filmed here, the city made an exception to the law, allowing the production company to use motorized vehicles on the island.

== History ==
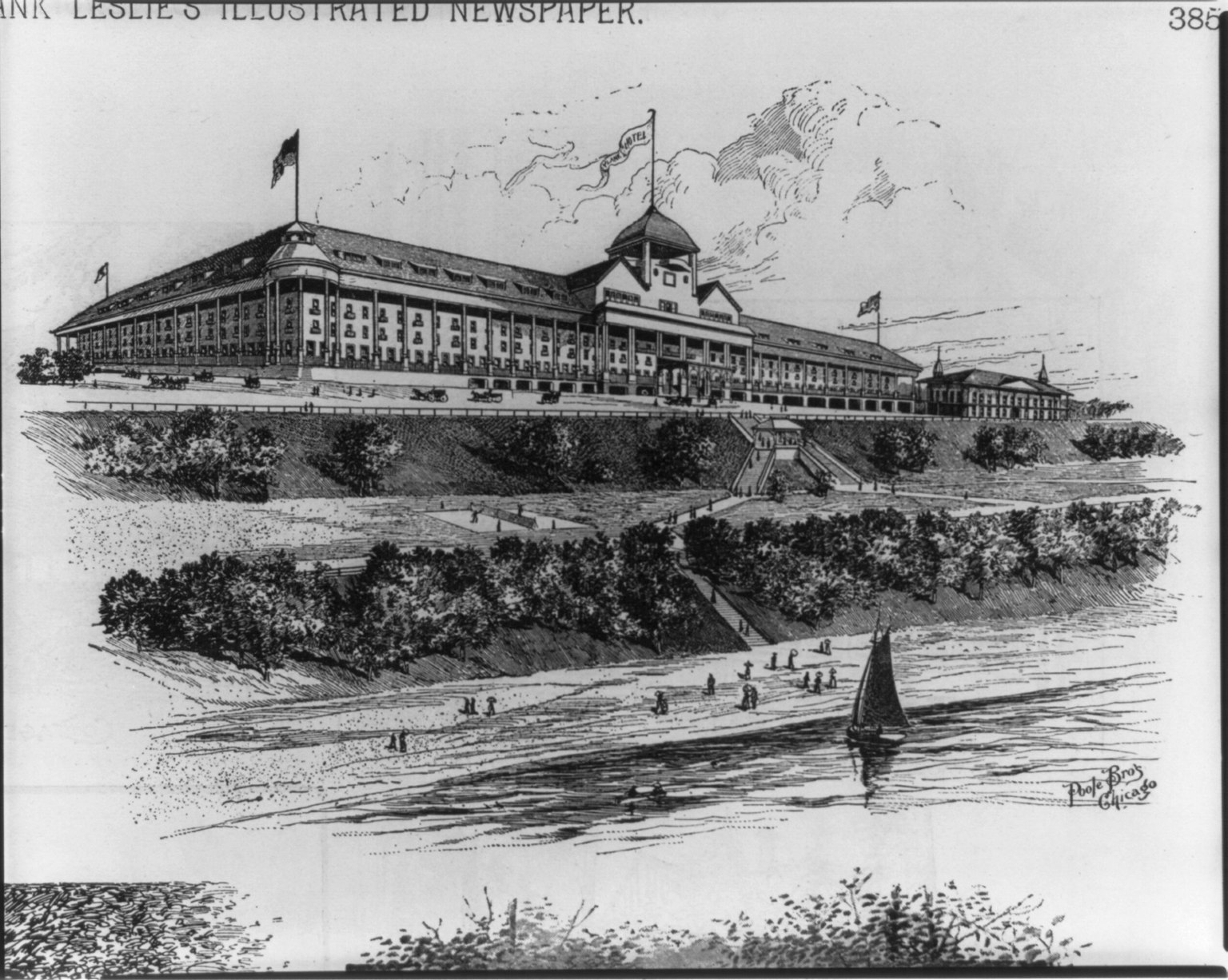
The Grand Hotel in 1890

Andrew Blackbird was the son of an Ottawa chief and served as an official interpreter for the U.S. government in the late 19th century. According to his 1887 history of the indigenous peoples of Michigan, the people of Mackinac Island had been a small independent tribe known as Mi-shi-ne-macki naw-go. They became affiliated with the larger tribe of Ottawa from Ottawa Island (now Manitoulin Island) situated north of Lake Huron.

One winter the Mi-shi-ne-macki naw-go on Mackinac were nearly annihilated by the Seneca, the westernmost nation of the Iroquois Confederacy, then based in present-day New York and Pennsylvania. Two natives escaped by hiding in one of the natural caves on the island. To commemorate this tribe, the Ottawa and Chippewa (Ojibwe) named the island as Mi-shi-ne-macki-nong, also known as Michilimackinac (meaning "Great Turtle") by the 18th century.

In 1654 French Jesuit missionaries recorded French traders at the island, who were with a large party of Huron and Ottawa heading to Three Rivers. Another trader was said to have made a canoe voyage to the island in 1665. The French colonists continued in the fur trade, which became extremely lucrative; they operated out of Montreal and Quebec, and established posts on Mi-shi-ne-macki-nong and throughout the Great Lakes area. After the French ceded their territory in North America to the British in 1763 following defeat in the Seven Years' War, the British established Fort St. Joseph and an installation on what was known as Michilimackinac. During the American Revolutionary War, they vacated the fort.

By 1782, the Americans established a garrison on what they called Mackinac Island, commanded by Captain Daniel Robertson; he had command until his death in 1787. In 1796 as a result of Jay's Treaty with Great Britain, settling the northern border, the island officially became part of the United States and its Northwest Territory.

In the early 1800s Mackinac Island had a permanent population of about 250. Although it was part of the United States, most of the residents were of French-Canadian and Métis ancestry, based on its colonial history, and French was the predominant language. The fur trade was the dominant feature of the economy. Native American languages, particularly Ojibwe and Odawa, and dialects were spoken by some residents. In the summer trading season, the population could reach 4,000, attracting agents and Native Americans from the interior.

After the War of 1812, the United States prohibited British fur traders from operating in US territory, cutting off some of the relations between Canadians and Native Americans on the US side. Some fur trading families divided their operations with posts on each side of the border. The noted French writer Alexis de Tocqueville visited Mackinac Island in July 1831 on his tour of the United States. He wrote about its unique population with its strong French and Native American influence.

Under American rule, Michilimackinac (the island and adjacent areas) had a justice of the peace, supervisor of roads, and two military captains until the borough was formed. The island's people made a request through Indian Agent William Henry Puthuff on February 2, 1817, that a borough be established on the island and for building a jailhouse. In response on March 15, 1817, Michigan Territory Secretary William Woodbridge issued a proclamation forming the Township of Michilimackinac, giving the jurisdiction's distance from Detroit, the territorial capital. The governor and judges passed an act on April 6, 1817, forming the Borough of Michilimackinac. The borough organizational meeting was held in the Indian Council House, presided over by Puthuff on Monday, July 7, 1817. (The site was within the boundaries of the current Marquette Park). At this meeting, the residents selected the following officers, a warden, two burgesses, a clerk, a marshal and a treasurer. Puthuff was selected as warden, the chief official similar to a mayor. The American Fur Company was formed on Main Street, now Market Street.

With the 1818 formation of Michilimackinac County by Territorial Governor Lewis Cass, this borough was named as the county seat. The Borough form was later replaced with that of a village. Waren Puthuff was authorized by borough act to build a wharf at the end of Cross Street, now named Astor Street after John Jacob Astor. This wharf is the longest-lasting wharf on the island and was later used as the coal dock.

On March 16, 1847, the Michigan state legislature passed a law abolishing the borough, effective April 1. The legislature reversed this action and incorporated the island as the Village of Mackinac, effective March 25, 1847.

In the late 19th century, Mackinac Island became a popular summer resort destination for travelers from major cities such as Chicago and later Detroit, as well as more distant ones. The Grand Hotel was built as a luxury venue. The seasonal peak of population in the summer, now made up of thousands of tourists and service workers, follows the earlier cycle of the fur trade. As then, it is a time of festivities and entertainment.

In 1860, the Augustus Pond vs. The People court case was held in the county courthouse. It clarified the self-defense legal principle informally expressed as “a man’s home is his castle.” Hubbard's Annex was platted on the former Ambrose Davenport farm west of the harbor in 1882 by Gurdon Saltonstall Hubbard. The county seat was moved from the municipality in 1882 to St. Ignace, as more population had moved into the western part of the county.

Personal motor vehicles were banned in 1895 in order to protect the health of the island horses and residents. Soon after the first automobiles made their way onto the island, members of Mackinac Island Carriage Tours petitioned the Village of Mackinac Island to ban the automobile as the "dangerous horseless carriage" startled the horses. This ban remains in effect today with only exceptions being city emergency vehicles (ambulance, police cars and fire trucks), city service vehicles and snowmobiles in winter.

The Michigan Legislature created the City of Mackinac Island on June 9, 1899, via act 437 as a special charter city, combining the Township of Holmes and Village of Mackinac. At that time, all of nearby Round Island was included in the corporate limits, for reasons not clear today.

Round Island is owned and overseen by the United States Forest Service in its entirety, and is managed as part of the Round Island Wilderness Area and the Hiawatha National Forest. The city limits include all of Mackinac Island State Park, which area makes up 82 percent of Mackinac Island; it is governed by the Mackinac Island State Park Commission.

== Geography ==
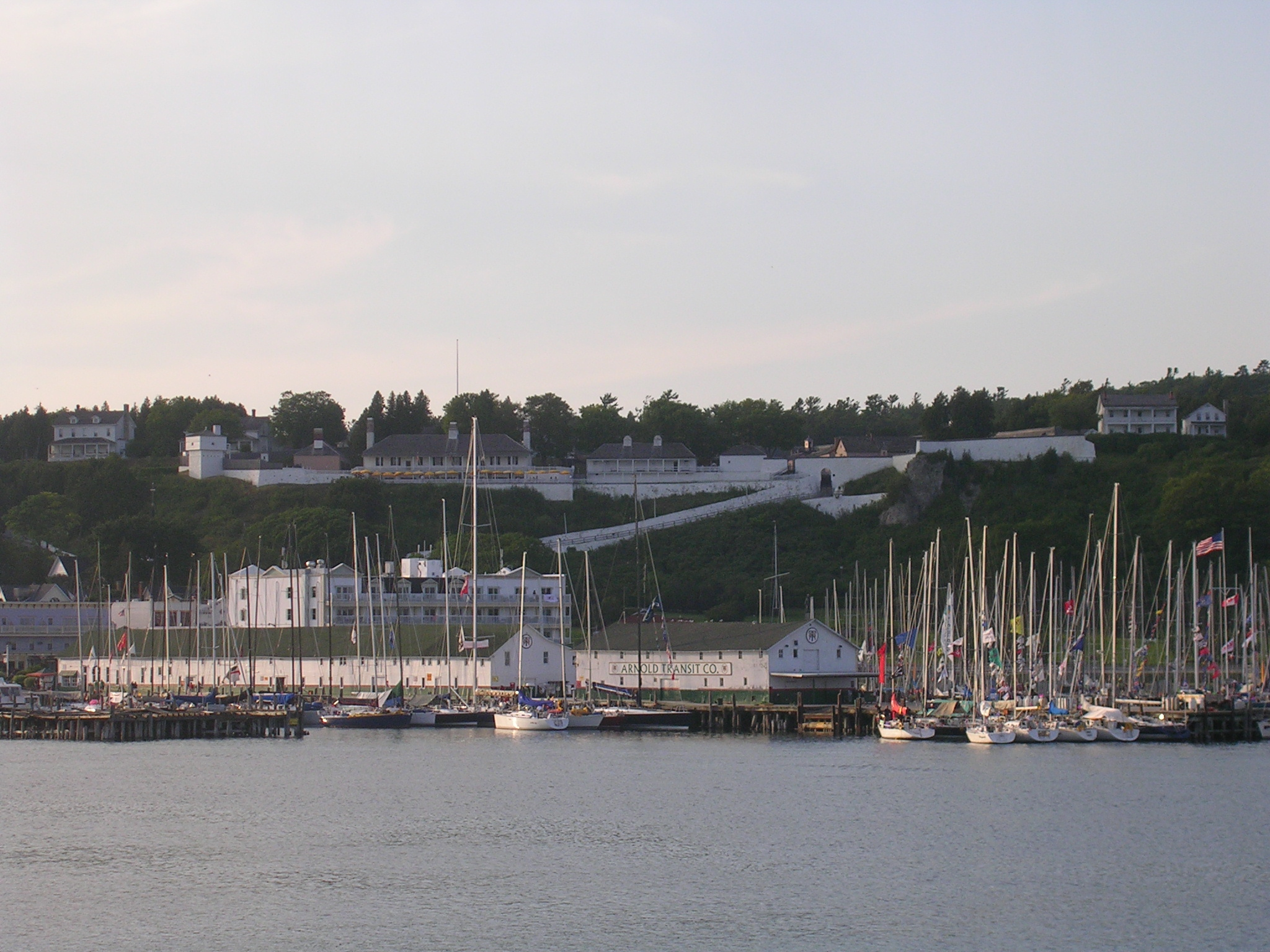
City and harbor

According to the United States Census Bureau, the city has a total area of 18.84 square miles (48.80 km^{2}), of which 4.35 square miles (11.27 km^{2}) is land and 14.49 square miles (37.53 km^{2}) is water. The City of Mackinac Island exists on the island of the same name, and it also nominally includes the entirety of nearby Round Island, situated in the Straits of Mackinac immediately to the south, which is uninhabited, and is owned and overseen by the United States Forest Service in its entirety, and is managed as part of the Round Island Wilderness Area and the Hiawatha National Forest.

While all of Mackinac Island, the landform, is located within the corporate limits of the City of Mackinac Island, today 82 percent of the island's landmass is owned by the State of Michigan and managed by the Mackinac Island State Park Commission (MISPC). The city has direct jurisdiction over only 18 percent of the island. The City and the Commission work together on the many issues affecting both the City and the State Park, such as the longtime ban on motorized vehicles on the island.

Access to the island is by ferries across Lake Huron. The city of Mackinac Island is one of seven municipalities in the state of Michigan to consist entirely of islands, including Grosse Ile, Drummond, Bois Blanc, St. James, Peaine, and Sugar Island townships.

Mackinac Island is encircled by M-185, a state highway that is only accessible to pedestrians, bicyclists, and horse-drawn vehicles, as cars are banned on the island. In downtown Mackinac Island, the highway is known as "Main Street", while elsewhere it is known as "Lake Shore Road".

=== Neighborhoods ===
- Harrisonville, also referred to as "the village", is a neighborhood of the city just past the Grand Hotel and up a hill.
- Hubbard's Annex is a summer cottage subdivision and historical district west of the harbor platted in 1882 by Gurdon Saltonstall Hubbard. The plans included a public park referred to as the Commons and a community building lot for the Eating House. Francis B. Stockbridge purchased a cottage on the bluff top in 1882, where the Dziabis cottage is now located.

== Demographics ==
=== Racial and ethnic composition ===
Mackinac Island, Michigan – Racial and ethnic composition Note: the US Census treats Hispanic/Latino as an ethnic category. This table excludes Latinos from the racial categories and assigns them to a separate category. Hispanics/Latinos may be of any race.
Race / Ethnicity (NH = Non-Hispanic)	Pop 2000	Pop 2010	Pop 2020	% 2000	% 2010	% 2020
White alone (NH)	394	358	435	75.33%	72.76%	74.61%
Black or African American alone (NH)	0	6	13	0.00%	1.22%	2.23%
Native American or Alaska Native alone (NH)	96	88	75	18.36%	17.89%	12.86%
Asian alone (NH)	2	3	1	0.38%	0.61%	0.17%
Native Hawaiian or Pacific Islander alone (NH)	0	0	0	0.00%	0.00%	0.00%
Other race alone (NH)	0	0	3	0.00%	0.00%	0.51%
Mixed race or Multiracial (NH)	28	26	34	5.35%	5.28%	5.83%
Hispanic or Latino (any race)	3	11	22	0.57%	2.24%	3.77%
Total	523	492	583	100.00%	100.00%	100.00%

Historical population
Census	Pop.	Note	%±
1880	720		—
1890	750		4.2%
1900	665		−11.3%
1910	714		7.4%
1920	493		−31.0%
1930	566		14.8%
1940	508		−10.2%
1950	572		12.6%
1960	942		64.7%
1970	517		−45.1%
1980	479		−7.4%
1990	469		−2.1%
2000	523		11.5%
2010	492		−5.9%
2020	583		18.5%
U.S. Decennial Census

=== 2020 census ===
As of the census of 2020, there were 583 people, 220 households, and 120 families residing in the city. The population density was 134.02 inhabitants per square mile (51.7/km^{2}).

=== 2010 census ===
As of the census of 2010, there were 492 people, 240 households, and 128 families residing in the city. The population density was 113.1 inhabitants per square mile (43.7/km^{2}). There were 1,002 housing units at an average density of 230.3 per square mile (88.9/km^{2}). The racial makeup of the city was 73.8% White, 1.2% African American, 18.1% Native American, 0.6% Asian, 0.2% Pacific Islander, 0.2% from other races, and 5.9% from two or more races. Hispanic or Latino of any race were 2.2% of the population.

There were 240 households, of which 22.5% had children under the age of 18 living with them, 39.2% were married couples living together, 7.5% had a female householder with no husband present, 6.7% had a male householder with no wife present, and 46.7% were non-families. 37.5% of all households were made up of individuals, and 9.6% had someone living alone who was 65 years of age or older. The average household size was 2.05 and the average family size was 2.69.

The median age in the city was 42.5 years. 17.7% of residents were under the age of 18; 7.6% were between the ages of 18 and 24; 27.4% were from 25 to 44; 33.9% were from 45 to 64; and 13.4% were 65 years of age or older. The gender makeup of the city was 52.8% male and 47.2% female.

=== 2000 census ===
As of the census of 2000, there were 523 people, 252 households, and 143 families residing in the city. The population density was 119.8 inhabitants per square mile (46.3/km^{2}). There were 565 housing units at an average density of 129.4 per square mile (50.0/km^{2}). The racial makeup of the city was 75.72% White, 18.36% Native American, 0.38% Asian, 0.19% from other races, and 5.35% from two or more races. Hispanic or Latino of any race were 0.57% of the population.

There were 252 households, out of which 23.4% had children under the age of 18 living with them, 44.4% were married couples living together, 9.5% had a female householder with no husband present, and 42.9% were non-families. 36.1% of all households were made up of individuals, and 9.5% had someone living alone who was 65 years of age or older. The average household size was 2.08 and the average family size was 2.69.

In the city, the population was spread out, with 18.0% under the age of 18, 6.5% from 18 to 24, 34.4% from 25 to 44, 28.9% from 45 to 64, and 12.2% who were 65 years of age or older. The median age was 41 years. For every 100 females, there were 109.2 males. For every 100 females age 18 and over, there were 106.3 males.

The median income for a household in the city was $36,964, and the median income for a family was $50,536. Males had a median income of $39,219 versus $25,313 for females. The per capita income for the city was $27,965. About 1.4% of families and 3.5% of the population were below the poverty line, including 5.1% of those under age 18 and none of those age 65 or over.

== Arts and culture ==
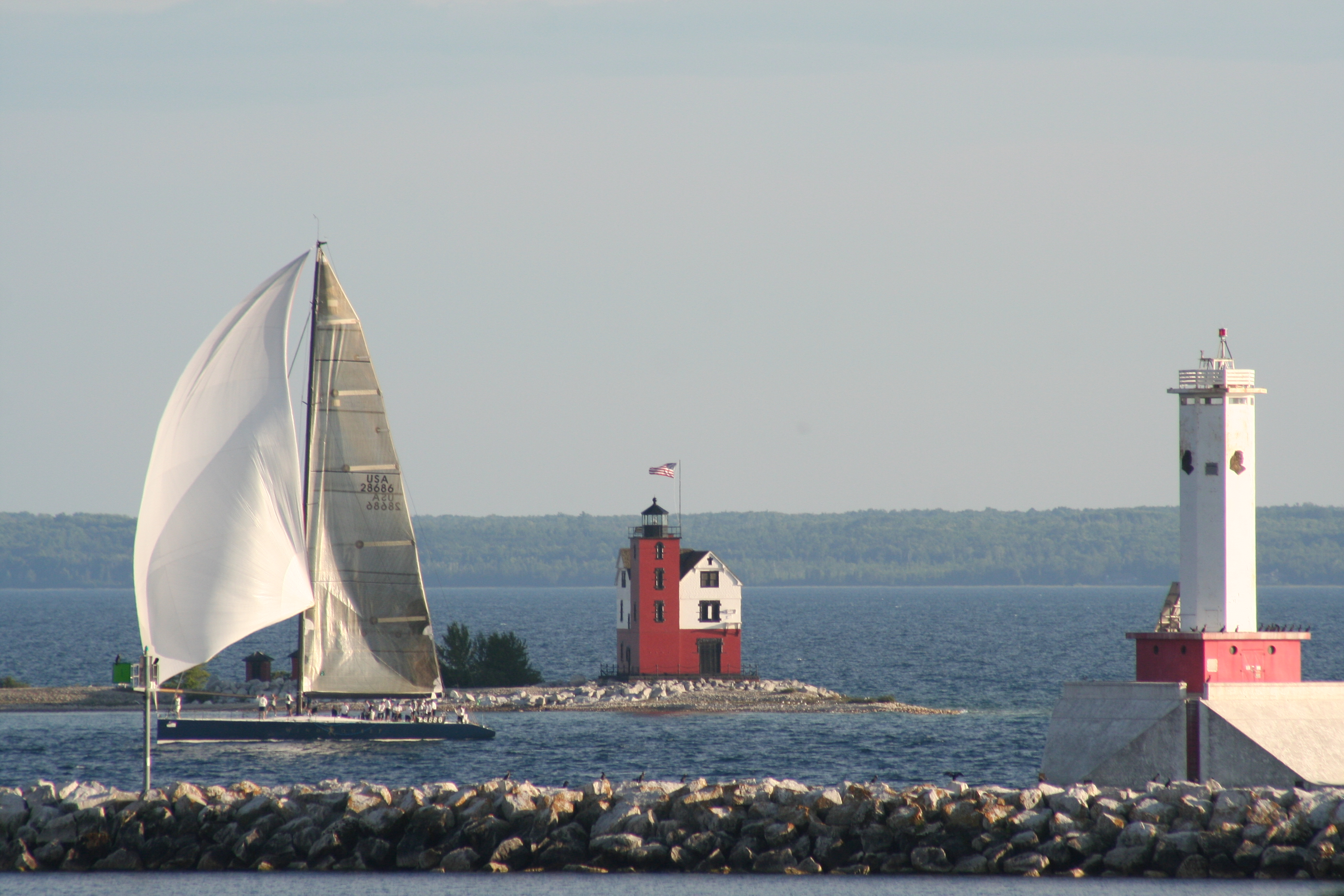
A sailboat crossing the finish line at Round Island Light during the Chicago Yacht Club Race to Mackinac

Mackinac Island is noted for its many fudge shops, a tourist attraction. The island has a large craft industry devoted to making fudge in a traditional manner, creating portions on cold marble slabs.

Mackinac Island is the destination of both the annual Chicago Yacht Club Race to Mackinac, run by the Chicago Yacht Club, and the annual Port Huron to Mackinac Boat Race, sponsored by the Bayview Yacht Club of Detroit.

=== Historic places ===
- Fort Mackinac
- Matthew Geary House
- Grand Hotel
- Indian Dormitory
- Mackinac Island
- Mission Church
- Mission House
- Round Island Light
- Round Island Passage Light
- Robert Stuart House
- Michigan Governor's Summer Residence

== Government ==
The city has an elected council with six members and a mayor. The mayor is elected annually. Margaret Doud was appointed to fill a vacancy on the council in 1974. In 1975, she ran for mayor and won. Doud has continually won re-election to the office since then, and as of 2025, she is the current longest-serving mayor in the United States.

== Education ==
The island is served by the Mackinac Island School District, which operates one school, (The Mackinac Island Public School), which houses grades Pre-K through 12 along with the school's administration.
