= M-185 (Michigan highway) =

State highway on Mackinac Island in Mackinac County, Michigan, United States

M-185
- M-185 highlighted in red

Route information
- Maintained by MDOT
- Length: 8.004 mi (12.881 km)
- Existed: 1933–present
- Restrictions: Pedestrians, bicycles or horses only

Major junctions
- Loop around Mackinac Island
- Fort Street; British Landing Road

Location
- Country: United States
- State: Michigan
- Counties: Mackinac

Highway system
- Michigan State Trunkline Highway System; Interstate; US; State; Byways
← M-183	→ M-186

M-185 is a state trunkline highway in the U.S. state of Michigan that circles Mackinac Island, a popular tourist destination on the Lake Huron side of the Straits of Mackinac, along the island's shoreline. A narrow paved road of 8.004 miles (12.881 km), it offers scenic views of the straits that divide the Upper and the Lower peninsulas of Michigan and Lakes Huron and Michigan. It has no connection to any other Michigan state trunkline highways—as it is on an island—and is accessible only by passenger ferry. The City of Mackinac Island, which shares jurisdiction over the island with the Mackinac Island State Park Commission (MISPC), calls the highway Main Street within the built-up area on the island's southeast quadrant, and Lake Shore Road elsewhere. M-185 passes by several important sites within Mackinac Island State Park, including Fort Mackinac, Arch Rock, British Landing, and Devil's Kitchen. Lake Shore Road carries the highway next to the Lake Huron shoreline, running between the water's edge and woodlands outside the downtown area.

According to the Michigan Department of Transportation (MDOT), M-185 is "the only state highway in the nation where motor vehicles are banned". Traffic on it is by foot, on horse, by horse-drawn vehicle, or by bicycle. (Note: Electric bicycles are generally prohibited. Such prohibition has been in effect since 1907. Class I e-bikes are permitted for use by those with a mobility disability, and Class II or Class III e-bikes are prohibited unless modified to meet a Class I designation. A permit is required to use an e-bike on the island, and their use or storage has been prohibited on property belonging to the city police and fire departments, the local school district and the Grand Hotel.) Restrictions on automobiles date back to 1898, and since the ban, only a few vehicles have been permitted on the island other than the city's emergency vehicles. The highway was built during the first decade of the 20th century by the state and designated as a state highway in 1933. The highway was paved in 1960, and portions were rebuilt to deal with shoreline erosion in the 1980s. Until an accident in 2005, it was the only state highway without any automobile accidents.

== Route description ==
As a circular highway, M-185 has no specific termini; the generally accepted starting point is at the mile 0 marker placed in front of the Mackinac Island State Park Visitor Center. The highway uses wooden markers to measure miles instead of the common metal signage; these signs are erected by the MISPC, as MDOT does not install the standard state highway reassurance markers along this roadway. M-185 is one of only three state trunkline highways in Michigan on islands; the others are M-134 on Drummond Island and M-154 on Harsens Island. No part of M-185 has been listed on the National Highway System, a network of roadways important to the country's economy, defense, and mobility. Over a half million people travel along the trunkline in a year.

Mackinac Island has been a tourist destination since the late 19th century. The island was the country's second national park, after Yellowstone, until the land was given to Michigan in 1895 to become its first state park. M-185 has been recognized in the press for its unique role as the only state highway without car traffic in the United States by such publications as the Chicago Tribune, The Kansas City Star, The Saturday Evening Post, and the Toronto Star. In 2003, it was named the "best scenic drive" in the state by The Detroit News. In 2008, USA Today named the island one of the "10 great places to get your feet back on the ground" as a car-free destination, highlighting the unique status of M-185 in the process. The magazine Paraplegia News, in an article encouraging its readers to visit Mackinac Island, called the trek around the island on M-185 a "high priority" for visitors. The trip around the island "provides a photo opportunity at every bend in the path", according to the PSA Journal, the official magazine of the Photographic Society of America.

=== Along the harbor ===
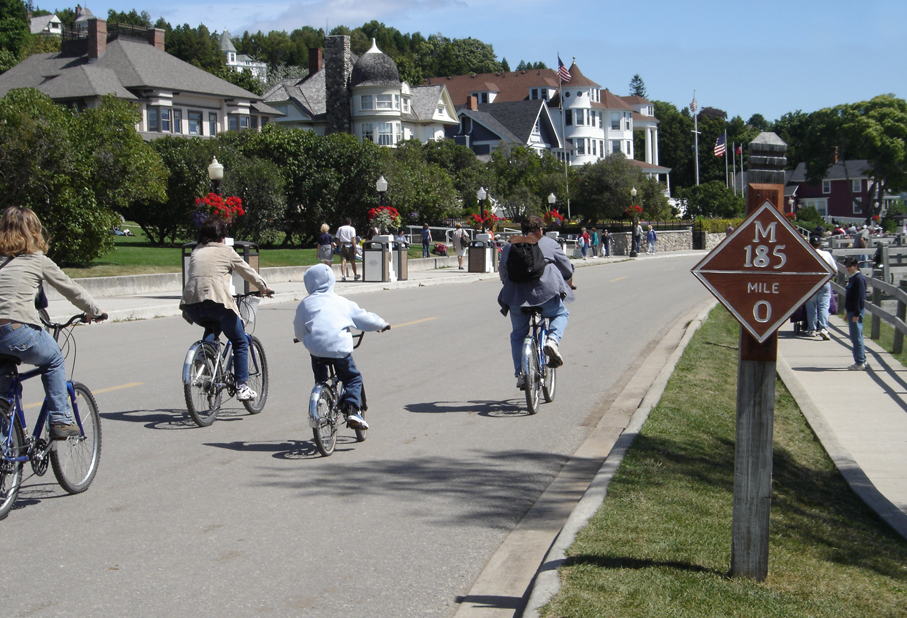
Bikers on M-185 at mile marker 0 in downtown Mackinac Island

The beginning and ending of M-185 is marked at the intersection of Main and Fort streets next to the visitor center. That building is operated by the MISPC, but it was originally a US Coast Guard station. From its starting point, M-185 heads east between Marquette Park, at the base of Fort Mackinac, and the marina at Haldimand Bay. The roadway passes the Indian Dormitory (Mackinac Art Center), as well as various hotels, bed and breakfast establishments, private residences and landmarks such as Sainte Anne's Catholic Church, Mission Church and the Mission House. Main Street then turns northeasterly, passing Mission Point Resort (the former Mackinac College), after which the road name changes to Lake Shore Road. Along this section of the trunkline, Shoreline Trail departs to the south and follows the water's edge before returning to M-185 at the city's water filtration plant.

=== Around the island ===
After rounding Mission Point, M-185 continues north-northwesterly along the eastern shore of Mackinac Island, first passing Dwightwood Spring then the Arch Rock viewing area just beyond the mile 1 marker. The next two miles (3.2 km) of M-185 are relatively isolated and devoid of major landmarks as the highway rounds Hennepin Point and runs along Voyageur's Bay. Other than a few picnic tables, the only feature between Arch Rock and mile 3 is the Lake Shore Nature Trail, a short interpretive trail on the inland side of the road. Just beyond mile 3, Scott's Shore Road, a short gravel-surfaced connecting roadway between Lake Shore Road and Scott's Road, departs inland near Point St. Clair. M-185 is bounded by the interior woods on one side and the beaches and rocky shores on the other through this area.

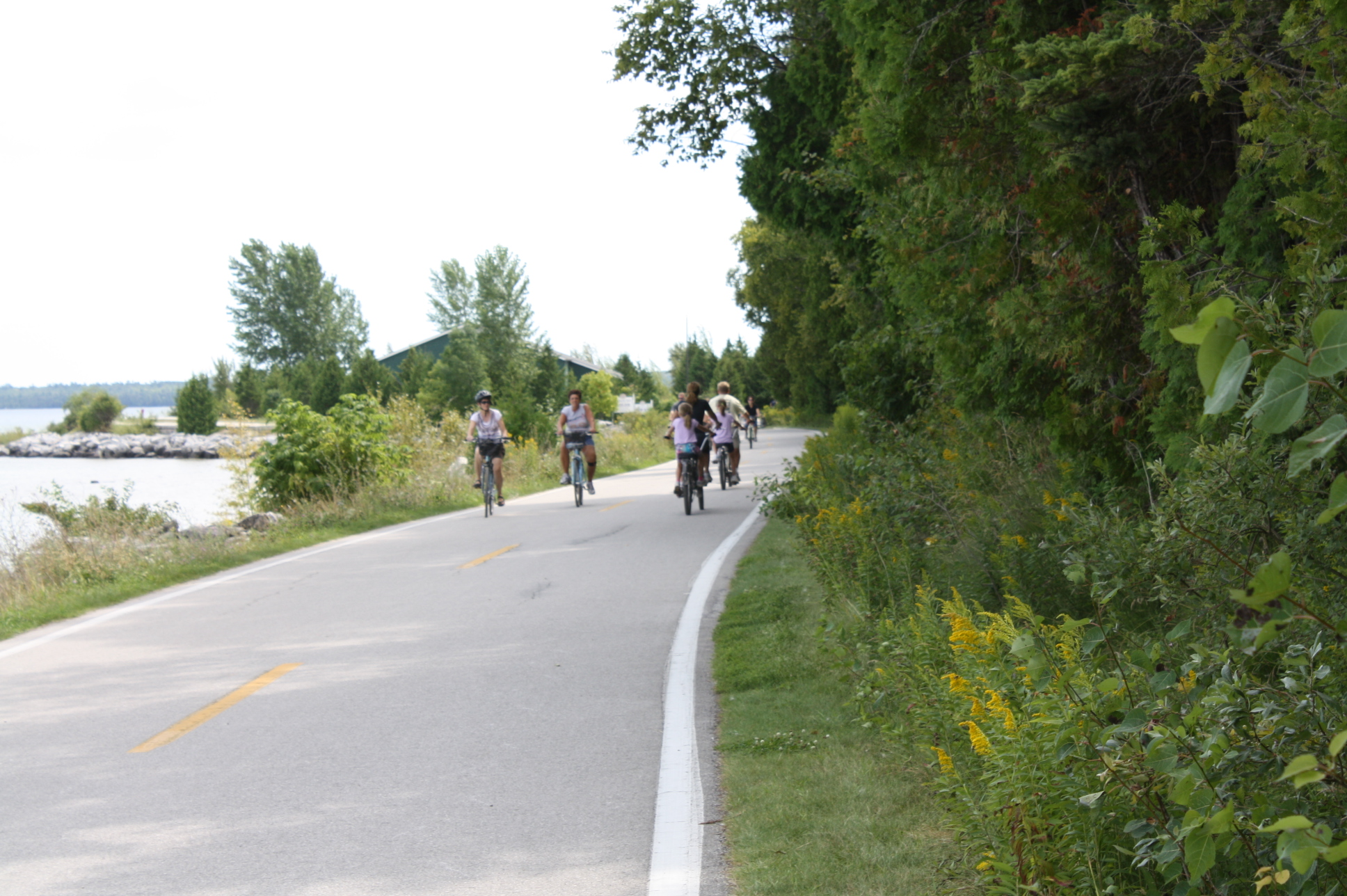
Looking south near mile 1

Mile 4 is situated at Point aux Pins at the northernmost point of the island. Here, M-185 turns southerly, passing the state boat dock and a nature center before coming to British Landing at the intersection with British Landing Road. The area is a popular stopping point for tourists biking or walking M-185; it is the location where British troops came ashore during the Battle of Mackinac Island during the War of 1812. Located around British Landing are various amenities including restrooms, picnic tables, and a concession stand. M-185 continues along Maniboajo Bay and passes the mile 5 marker near Radisson Point.

The next area along M-185 is also sparsely developed as it passes along Griffin Cove. Other than a few newer residential developments, the sights are limited to Brown's Brook, which features a picnic area and interpretive nature trail, and the views of the Mackinac Bridge as the trunkline rounds both Heriot and Perrot points. Between the markers for miles 6 and 7 is Devil's Kitchen, another popular tourist stopping point, at Jacker Point. Near mile 7 is the West Bluff Stairs leading up the bluff to Pontiac's Lookout. Further along, there is a marker commemorating the filming of a scene from Somewhere in Time as well as views of the Grand Hotel. The building's 660-foot-long (200 m) front porch is promoted as the "longest in the world". Visible to the east of the hotel is Michigan's second Governor's Mansion, which is used as a summer retreat for the state's chief executive. At this point, M-185 transitions back to the more developed portion of the island and the road name for the trunkline changes back to Main Street. Next to the roadway, a boardwalk runs from here into the downtown business district.

=== Entering downtown ===
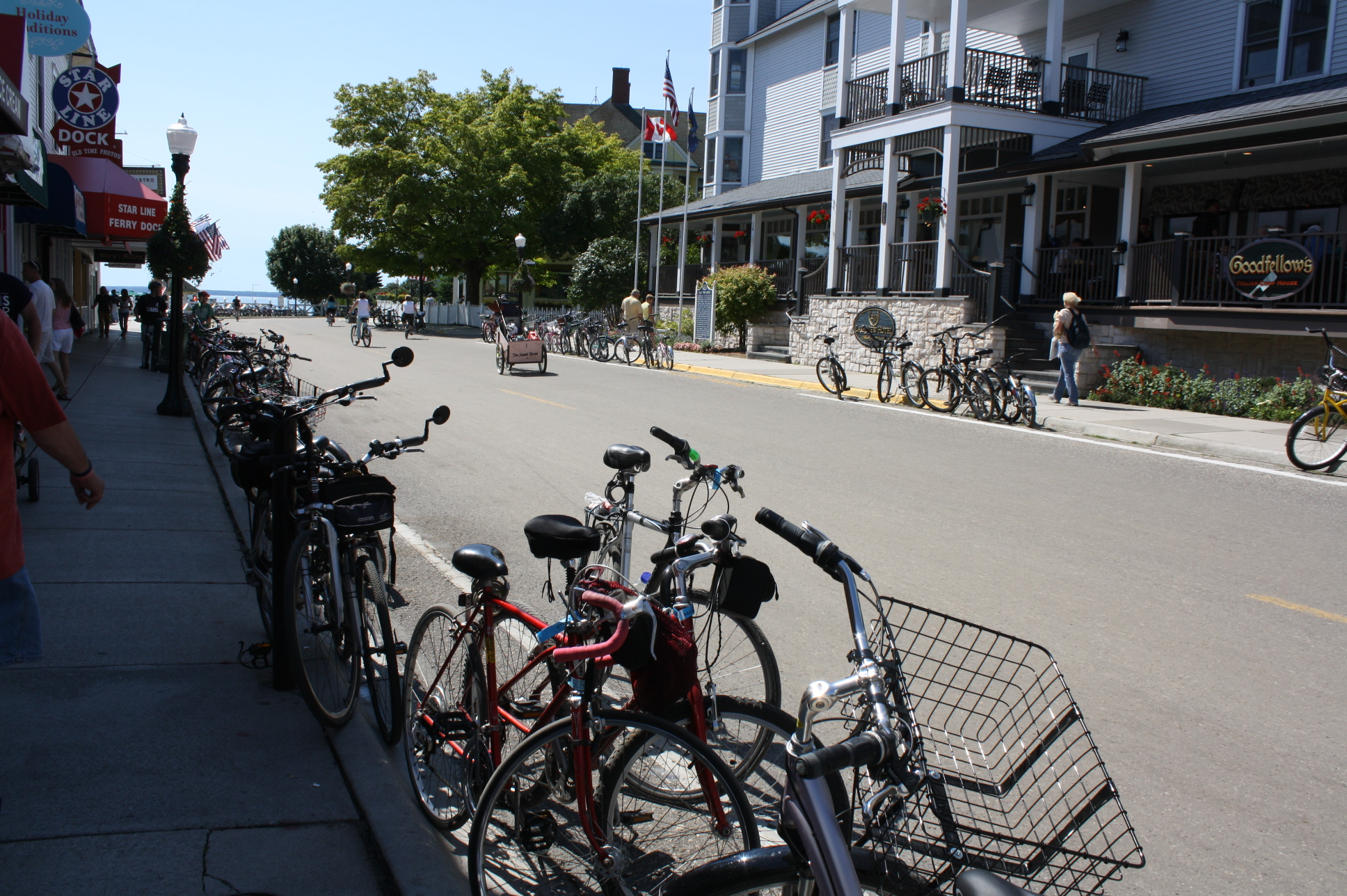
Downtown Mackinac Island near the Mackinac Island Ferry Company Dock No.2 and the Lake View Hotel

The first landmark as the highway approaches downtown Mackinac Island is the island's public school building. As it passes the island's public library on the shoreline side of the street, Main Street makes a sweeping curve to the north at Windermere, or Biddle's, Point to run through the downtown district. Other than the library, most of the city's public buildings are actually situated along Market Street, one block behind Main Street. Three streets and a city park allow for connections between Main and Market streets. M-185 through downtown Mackinac Island passes through the major business district, featuring dozens of shops, restaurants and lodging establishments; nearly a dozen of these outlets feature the authentic Mackinac Island fudge made fresh daily during tourist season. The passenger ferry docks are all situated along Main Street in the downtown area. At the northeastern end of the downtown district, Main Street intersects Fort Street at the state park visitor center to complete its circuit of Mackinac Island.

== History ==
The first city ordinances banning all motorized vehicles from the island were passed on July 6, 1898, with similar state park rules coming in 1901. The residents complained after a doctor's car scared their horses and caused carriage accidents, and these complaints prompted the ban. This ban was extended to "motor bicycles" in 1907. As such, other than a handful of emergency and utility vehicles as well as others by special, limited-time permit, no cars or trucks are allowed on the island and no motorized vehicles appear on M-185. During the winter months, the Mackinac Island Police sometimes patrols the island by snowmobile. Traffic on this highway is by foot, on horse, by horse-drawn vehicle, or by bicycle; M-185 is the only such state highway in the country "that allows no automobiles". As a result, the roadside litter is picked up using a horse-drawn wagon.

Lake Shore Road around the island was built between 1900 and 1910 by the state. The M-185 designation was first assigned in 1933 when park officials convinced the state highway commissioner to add the roadway to the state highway system because their budget could not cover the maintenance costs. The roadway was purpose-built for non-motorized use; it is narrower than other state highways. Its 12-foot (3.7 m) width is the equivalent of a standard highway lane. In late 1960, the state paved the road in asphalt, replacing the limestone and manure composition used previously. With the cessation of the car ferries across the Straits of Mackinac, and the extra costs to get the necessary equipment to the island, annual maintenance rose to $14,000/year (equivalent to $117,000/year in 2025). After the resurfacing, annual costs were expected to drop to $5,000/year (equivalent to $42,000/year in 2025). Since the 1970s, the MISPC has allowed snowmobiles to operate on Mackinac Island during the winter. In 1976, a centerline was painted on the highway for the first time, and provisions for bicycle parking were added to the downtown sections. Work was also done to mitigate erosion in the $200,000 (equivalent to $880,000 in 2025) project.

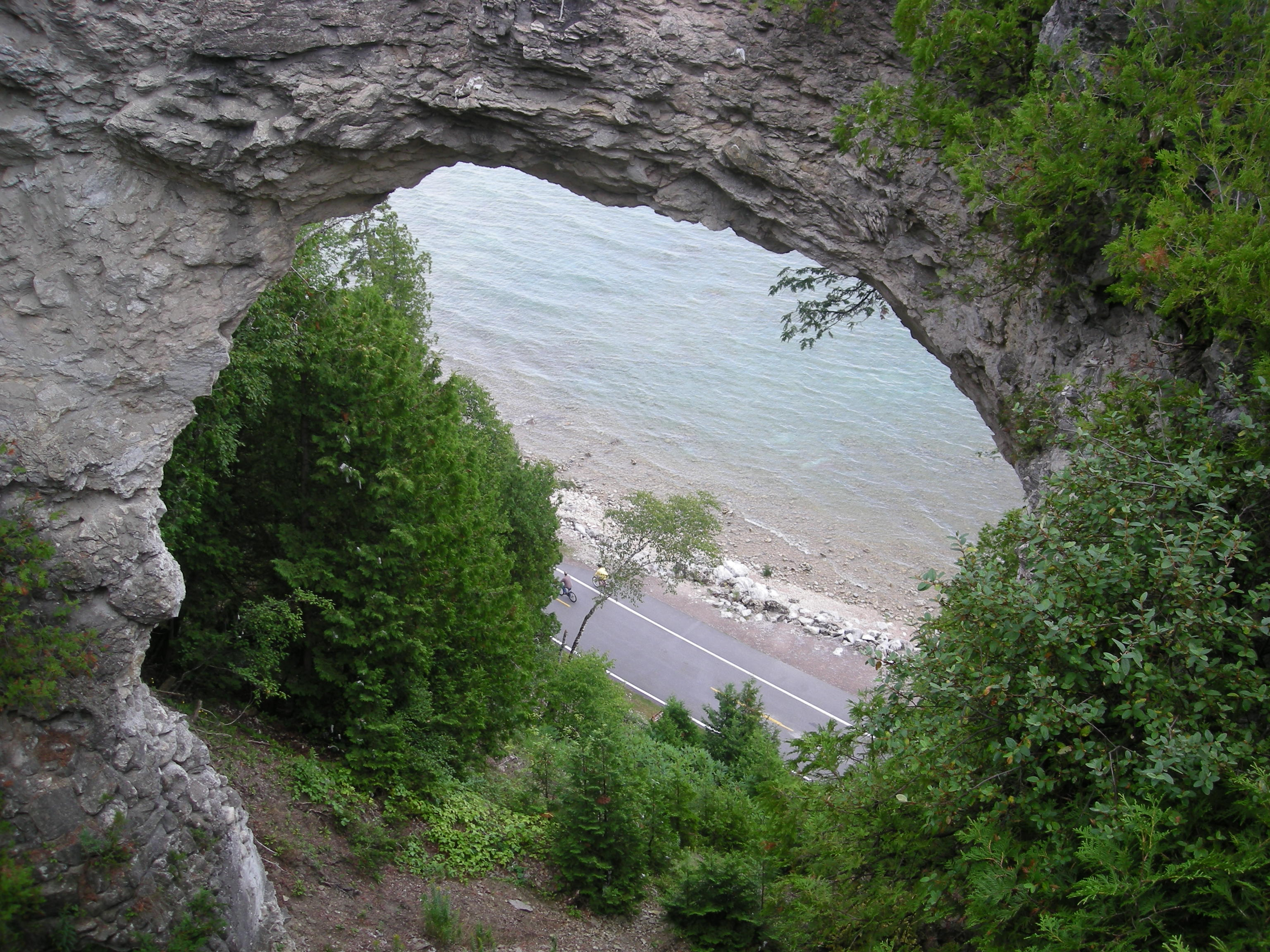
A view of M-185 through Arch Rock

In the mid-1980s, rising water levels in Lake Huron endangered M-185 and bicyclists. The roadway was overwashed by waves from the lake during a storm on May 31, 1985; the waves littered the road with gravel and dirt and raised fears of erosion. MDOT spent around $50,000 (equivalent to $127,000 in 2025) to install 2,500 short tons (2,200 long tons; 2,300 t) of rock and filter cloth designed to prevent erosion. The expectation at the time was that Lake Huron could rise another 4–5 inches (10–13 cm) that summer. Such a lake level increase prompted worries that the waves would wash away sections of the road. The lake had already washed away shoreline near Arch Rock; there was at least 8 feet (2.4 m) of berm between the road and shoreline in the 1970s and by 1985 some sections had been reduced to just 2 inches (5.1 cm). Storms later that year washed away sections of M-185, removing huge chunks of asphalt. MDOT closed those stretches on July 7, 1986, after the Independence Day weekend, to fix the damage. Repairs were budgeted to replace the missing sections of roadway at a cost of $894,366 (equivalent to $2.22 million in 2025); tourists were detoured inland, and uphill, to access the island's various tourist attractions.

In 1979, while filming Somewhere in Time, a car was brought on the island for Christopher Reeve's character to drive. The next time that a vehicle was permitted on the island was on July 6, 1998, to commemorate the original ordinance that prohibited cars from Mackinac Island. A 1901 Geneva steam-powered car toured the island and was exhibited in Marquette Park before being towed by horse back to British Landing. When Vice President Mike Pence visited the island in September 2019 to attend the Mackinac Republican Leadership Conference, he was accompanied by an eight-vehicle motorcade, a first for the island; a car was hidden on the island in case of emergency when President Gerald R. Ford visited in 1975.

MDOT obtained a $242,000 grant (equivalent to $413,000 in 2025) from the Federal Highway Administration in 2002 to purchase conservation easements along M-185. The land adjacent to the highway on the east side of the island is publicly owned while along the west it is mostly private. The grant allowed the MISPC and MDOT to either purchase the development rights to adjacent properties along Lake Shore Road, or the adjacent properties themselves.

The only known motor vehicle collision on Mackinac Island occurred on M-185 at the head of the Shepler passenger ferry dock on May 13, 2005, when the island's fire truck slightly damaged the door on the island's ambulance; both vehicles were responding to a report from the ferryboat that an injured passenger required medical attention. Before this incident, it was the only state highway that "never had an automobile accident" according to the Toronto Star.

In early 2016, the Native American Cultural Trail was created along M-185. The trail consists of a series of six information panels with bicycle parking areas. The panels were created in a collaboration between the Little Traverse Bay Bands of Odawa Indians and the MISPC along with funding by Mackinac Associates, a friends group that works with the state park. A portion of M-185 was resurfaced starting in September 2016. MDOT estimated the cost to be $900,000 (equivalent to $1,182,000 in 2025).

In late 2019, high water levels and winter storms damaged sections of the highway, and MDOT initiated emergency repairs including some erosion mitigation measures at a projected cost of $350,000. Further reconstruction work was started in 2020 to repair about half of the highway at a cost of about $1.4 million. M-185 was closed at the state park boundary north of the Mission Point Resort to British Landing, a distance of about four miles (6.4 km) in mid-June. This project includes the installation of rip-rap to help protect the roadway from rising water levels in the Great Lakes. MDOT plans to have the project completed by mid-September and to open sections of the highway to tourist traffic in stages as work is completed, starting with the stretch north to Arch Rock. Additionally to accommodate tourists, the roadway will be initially rebuilt with a gravel surface to be paved later in the year as work progresses.

In 2024, M-185 was the last state highway in Michigan to receive a speed limit. Legislation signed by Governor Gretchen Whitmer set a limit of 15 miles per hour (24 km/h) along the highway, noting that some e-bikes could reach speeds of 28 miles per hour (45 km/h).

== Major intersections ==
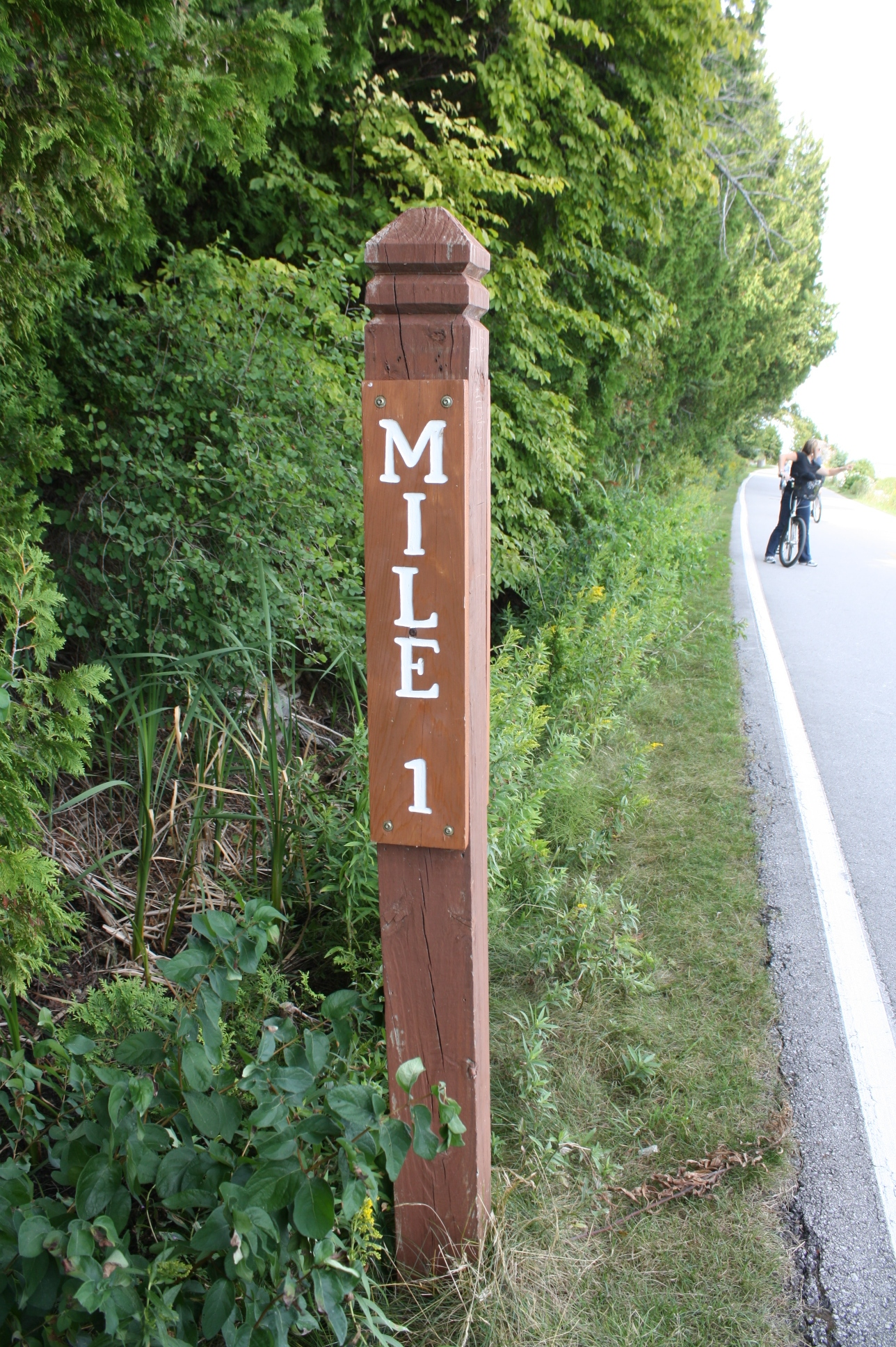
Newer milemarker sign erected along the highway in 2011

The entire highway is on Mackinac Island, which is located in Mackinac County. Milemarkers are posted in a counterclockwise fashion.

mi	km	Destinations	Notes
0.000	0.000	Fort Street	Terminus used for milemarkers
4.552	7.326	British Landing Road	Leads to interior of the island; British Landing
7.607	12.242	Market Street	Leads to many signposted historic sites in the downtown area
8.004	12.881	Fort Street	Terminus used for milemarkers
1.000 mi = 1.609 km; 1.000 km = 0.621 mi
