= Marquette Park =

Marquette Park may refer to one of several places that are named in honor of Jacques Marquette, a French Jesuit missionary.

- Marquette Park (Chicago) in Chicago, Illinois
- Marquette Park (Gary) in Gary, Indiana
- Marquette Park (Mackinac Island) on Mackinac Island, Michigan
- Marquette Park (St. Louis), a historic park in the Dutchtown neighborhood of St. l

Louis with a recreation center and pool
