= Agatha Biddle =

Métis fur trader and community leader

- Born: 1797
- Died: 1873 (aged 75–76); Mackinac Island
- Occupation: Fur trader, community organizer, philanthropist
- Awards: Michigan Women's Hall of Fame (2018)

Agatha de LaVigne Biddle (c. 1797–1873) was a woman of Odawa and French heritage, who primarily identified with her Odawa kin. She resided on Mackinac Island during the fur trade era and after. She acted as a partner with her husband in running their fur trade business, and Biddle was known as a shrewd businesswoman and her kinship connections were an integral part of the Biddle business. Following in the footsteps of another native woman, Maw-che-paw-go-quay, Agatha Biddle was also a woman serving as chief for the Mackinac Island band of the Mackinac Bands of Chippewa and Ottawa Indians. She was pivotal in the negotiations of the 1855 Treaty of Detroit where she used her relationships with local Indigenous peoples and settlers to negotiate on behalf of the Ojibwe and Odawa peoples. Biddle was also renowned for her charity, and the aid she provided to her community, including needy children. The home she shared with her husband, independent fur trader Edward Biddle, known as Biddle House, still stands on Mackinac Island and was the site of many local gatherings. Agatha Biddle was inducted into the Michigan Women's Hall of Fame on October 18, 2018.

== Early life ==
Biddle was born Agatha de LaVigne. Her mother was Marie Lefevre de La Vigne and her father was Kougowma (or Kiogima), also called La Vigne of the Odawa people. After the death of Agatha's father, her mother married Joseph Bailly, a fur trader of French descent originally from Nova Scotia who came to some prominence. They lived in the Mackinac area and Agatha continued to have a close relationship with her mother after her marriage.

== Marriage and family ==
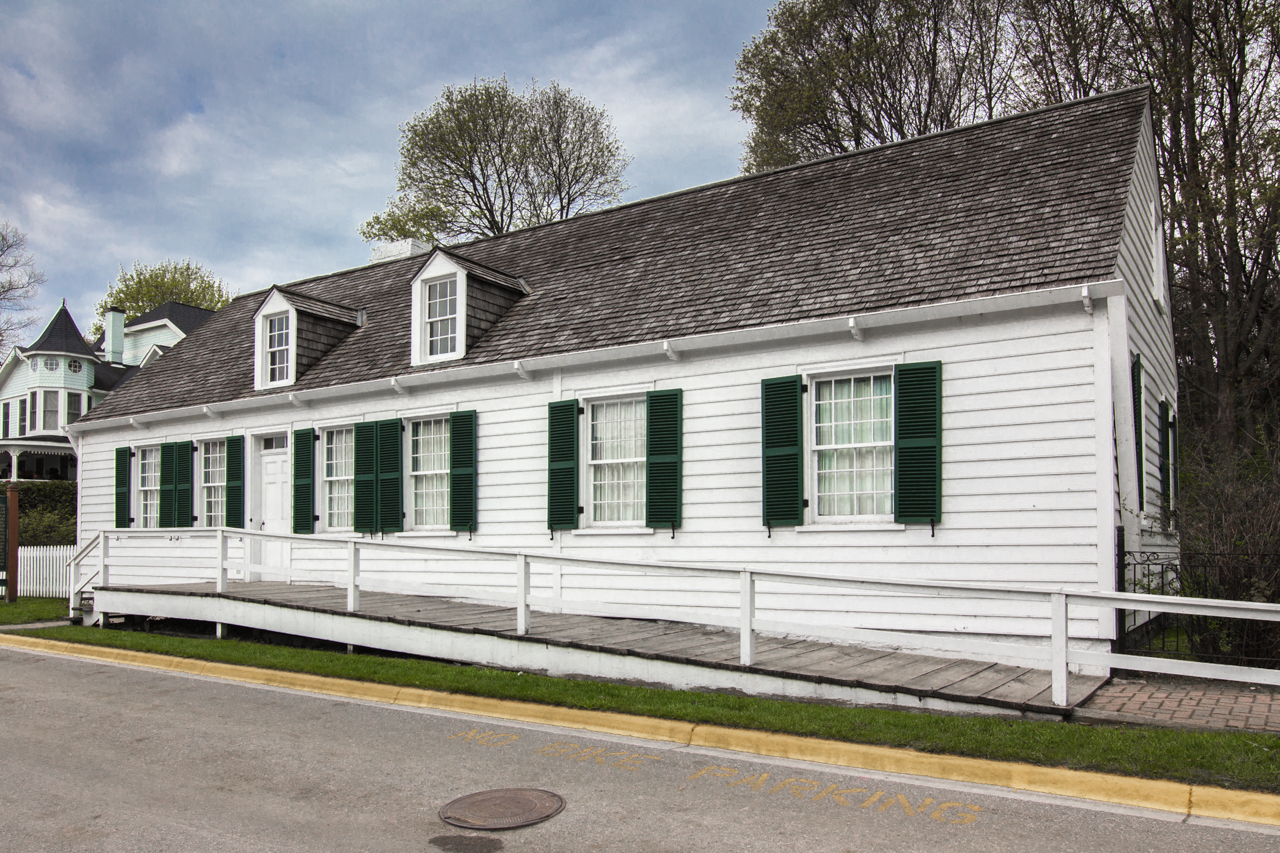
Biddle House, Mackinac Island

Edward Biddle arrived on Mackinac Island shortly after the conclusion of the War of 1812 and it is after this date that Agatha and Edward married. By marrying Agatha, Biddle made a connection to the prominent Bailly fur trading family. Details of their wedding were recorded, and guests included many prominent members of Mackinac society, including Madeline La Framboise. Agatha and her mother were recorded by contemporary Elisabeth Baird as wearing the traditional dress of the Métis women of the area at the wedding. This included layers of broadcloth, leggings, moccasins, ribbons and beads, all elaborately embroidered. Biddle continued to wear traditional clothing through her life. Fleming notes the marriage of Edward and Agatha was not unusual for the time. However, while it was typical for Métis women to marry outside their home community, Edward Biddle was an English-speaking, Protestant American in a community that was primarily Indigenous and French Canadian. Together Agatha and Edward Biddle had four children: Sophia, John, Sarah and Mary and together they built their business. Their youngest daughter Mary died at the age of eight after falling through the ice while travelling between Mackinac Island and St. Ignace and her grave is the oldest in the St. Ann cemetery.

== Fur trade and later life on Mackinac ==
During the early period of the fur trade the Mackinac and surrounded area were primarily inhabited by First Nations people, but by the middle of the nineteenth century their numbers were greatly reduced due to war, including the War of 1812, and treaties which saw many of the local Ojibwe and Odawa people relocated to tiny parcels of land.

Biddle took on a number of community roles, including taking in sick or orphaned Anishnaabe children and offering food and other charity. She is recorded as serving as undertaker on the island. She supplied coffins and carried out burial services.

Biddle is cited as an example of the way Métis women used their connections between local First Nations communities as well as settler communities to advantage in the fur trade society of the Great Lakes. Fleming notes that there is archeological evidence to support the fact that Biddle worked with birch bark, as well as engaging in quill work and basketry.
