= Mackinac Island =

Island in Michigan, United States

Mackinac
Native name: Michilimackinac Mishimikinaak ᒥᔑᒥᑭᓈᒃ
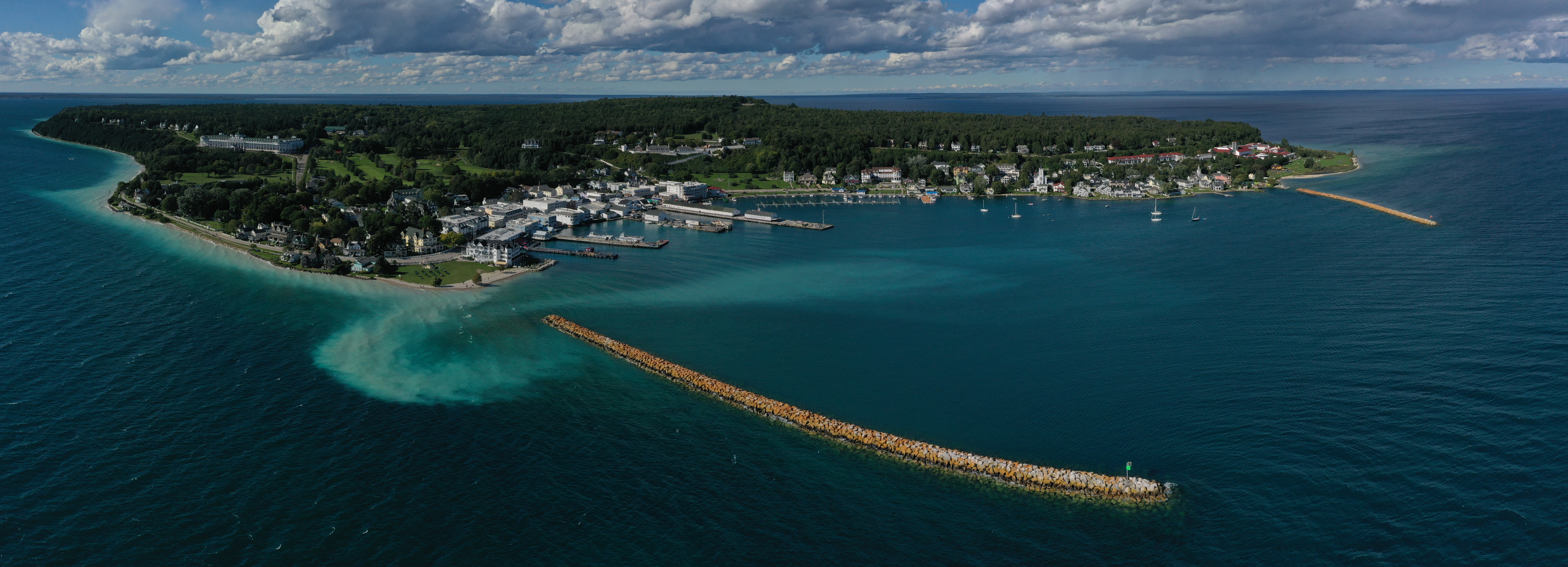
- Aerial view of Mackinac Island

- Topographic map of Mackinac island
- Location of Mackinac island

Geography
- Location: Lake Huron
- Coordinates: 45°51′40″N 84°37′50″W
- Area: 4.35 sq mi (11.3 km^{2})
- Coastline: 9.6 mi (15.4 km)
- Highest elevation: 890 ft (271 m)
- Highest point: Fort Holmes

Administration
- United States
- State: Michigan
- Largest settlement: Mackinac Island (pop. 583)
- Mayor: Margaret Doud
- County: Mackinac County

Demographics
- Population: 583 (2020)
- Pop. density: 134.02/sq mi (51.745/km^{2})
- Ethnic groups: see demographics
- Mackinac Island
- U.S. National Register of Historic Places
- U.S. National Historic Landmark District
- Michigan State Historic Site
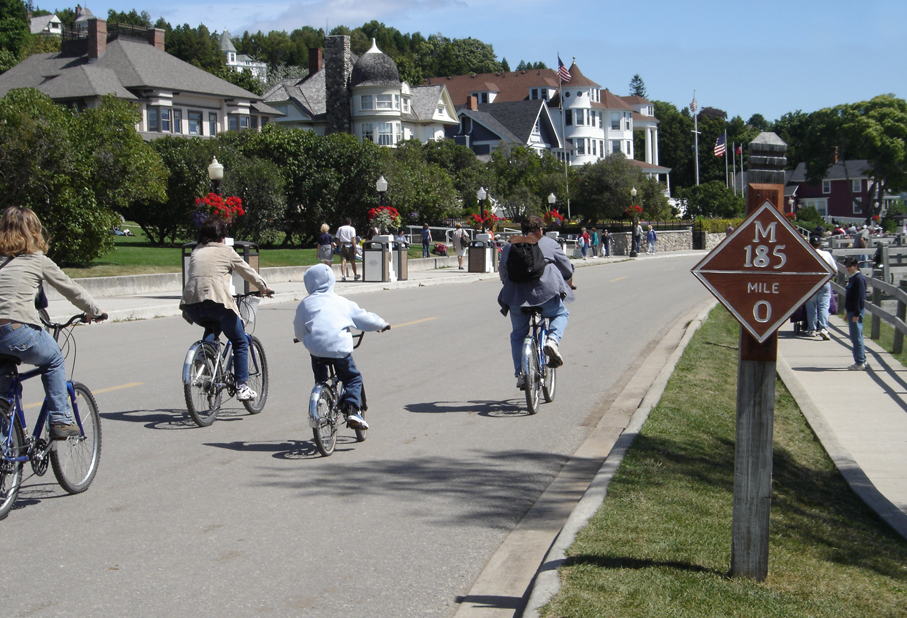
- Cyclists on M-185 (Main Street) at mile marker 0 in downtown Mackinac Island
- Location: Mackinac Island, Michigan
- NRHP reference No.: 66000397

Significant dates
- Added to NRHP: October 15, 1966
- Designated NHLD: October 9, 1960
- Designated MSHS: July 19, 1956

Additional information
- ZIP code(s): 49757
- Area code: 906

Mackinac Island (/ˈmækənɔː/ MAK-ə-naw, locally /ˈmækənə/ MAK-ə-nə; French: Île Mackinac; Ojibwe: Mishimikinaak ᒥᔑᒥᑭᓈᒃ; Ottawa: Michilimackinac) is an island and resort area, covering 4.35 square miles (11.3 km^{2}) in land area, in the U.S. state of Michigan. The name of the island in Odawa is Michilimackinac and "Mitchimakinak" in Ojibwemowin, meaning "Great Turtle". It is located in Lake Huron, at the eastern end of the Straits of Mackinac, between the state's Upper and Lower Peninsulas and northwest of Round Island. The island was long home to an Odawa settlement and previous indigenous cultures before European settlement began in the 17th century. It was a strategic center of the fur trade around the Great Lakes. Based on a former trading post, Fort Mackinac was constructed on the island by the British during the American Revolutionary War. It was the site of two battles during the War of 1812 before the northern border was settled and the US gained this island in its territory.

In the late 19th century, Mackinac Island became a popular tourist attraction and summer colony. Many of the structures on the island have undergone extensive historical preservation and restoration. Because of its historic significance, the entire island is listed as a National Historic Landmark. It is well known for numerous cultural events; a wide variety of architectural styles, including the Victorian-era Grand Hotel; and its ban on almost all motor vehicles, with exceptions only for city emergency vehicles (ambulance, police cars and fire trucks), city service vehicles and snowmobiles in winter. More than 80 percent of the island is preserved as Mackinac Island State Park.

== Etymology ==
Like many historic places in the Great Lakes region, Mackinac Island's name derives from a Native American language, in this case the Ojibwe language. The Anishinaabe peoples in the Straits of Mackinac region likened the shape of the island to that of a turtle, so they named it "Mitchimakinak" (Ojibwe: mishimikinaak) "Big Turtle". Andrew Blackbird, an official interpreter for the U.S. government and son of an Odawa chief, said the island was known locally after a tribe that had lived there. The French transliterated the word and spelled it as Michilimackinac. The British shortened it to the present name: "Mackinac". Michillimackinac is also spelled as Mishinimakinago, Mǐshǐma‛kǐnung, Mi-shi-ne-macki naw-go, Missilimakinak, Teiodondoraghie, and in Ojibwe syllabics: ᒥᔑᒥᑭᓈᒃ.

The Menominee traditionally lived in a large territory of 10 million acres (40,000 km^{2}) extending from Wisconsin to the Upper Peninsula of Michigan. Historic references include one by Father Frederic Baraga, a Slovenian missionary priest in Michigan, who in his 1878 dictionary wrote:

Mishinimakinago; pl.-g.—This name is given to some strange Indians (according to the sayings of the Otchipwes [Ojibwe]), who are rowing through the woods, and who are sometimes heard shooting, but never seen. And from this word, the name of the village of Mackinac, or Michillimackinac, is derived.

Maehkaenah is the Menominee word for turtle. In his 1952 book The Indian Tribes of North America, John Reed Swanton recorded under the "Wisconsin" section: "Menominee", a band named "Misi'nimäk Kimiko Wini'niwuk, 'Michilimackinac People', near the old fort at Mackinac, Mich."

In an early written history of Mackinac Island (1887) by Andrew Blackbird, the Odawa historian, he describes that a small independent tribe called "Mi-shi-ne-macki naw-go" once occupied Mackinac Island. They became confederated with the Ottawa from Ottawa Island (now Manitoulin Island), situated north of Lake Huron. One winter the Mi-shi-ne-macki naw-go on Mackinac Island were almost entirely annihilated by the Seneca people from western New York, who were one of the Five Nations of the Iroquois Confederacy. Only two of the local natives escaped by hiding in one of the natural caves at the island. To commemorate the losses of this allied tribe, the Ottawa named what is now Mackinac Island as "Mi-shi-ne-macki-nong". In 1895 John R. Bailey, the doctor at Fort Mackinac, published a history entitled Mackinac formerly Michilimackinac, describing some of the earliest French traders on Mackinac. They reportedly arrived in 1654 with a large party of Huron and Ottawa heading to Three Rivers; another visitor was an adventurer making a canoe voyage in 1665.

== History ==
=== Prehistoric ===
Archaeologists have excavated prehistoric fishing camps on Mackinac Island and in the surrounding areas. Fishhooks, pottery, and other artifacts establish a Native American presence at least 700 years before European exploration, around AD 900. The island is a sacred place in the tradition of some of its earliest known inhabitants, the Anishinaabe peoples. They consider it to be home of the Gitche Manitou, or the "Great Spirit". According to legend, Mackinac Island was created by the Great Hare, Michabou, and was the first land to appear after the Great Flood receded. The island was a gathering place for the local tribes, who made offerings to Gitche Manitou. It became the burial place of tribal chiefs.

The first European likely to have seen Mackinac Island is Jean Nicolet, a French-Canadian coureur des bois, during his 1634 explorations. The Jesuit priest Claude Dablon founded a mission for the Native Americans on Mackinac Island in 1670, and stayed over the winter of 1670–71. The missionary and explorer Jacques Marquette succeeded him, moving the mission to St. Ignace soon after his arrival in the region in the fall of 1671. With the mission as a focus, the Straits of Mackinac quickly became an important French fur trading location. The British took control of the Straits after the French and Indian War and Major Patrick Sinclair chose the bluffs of the island for Fort Mackinac in 1780.

The Jesuit Relations (1671) contains a long description of Mackinac Island:

its fisheries, its phenomena of wind and tide, and the tribes who, now and in the past, have made it their abode. A favorite resort for all the Algonkin tribes, many are returning to it since the peace with the Iroquois. On this account, the Jesuits have begun a new mission, opposite Mackinac, called St. Ignace. Thither have fled the Hurons, driven from Chequamegon Bay by fear of the Sioux, "the Iroquois of the West."

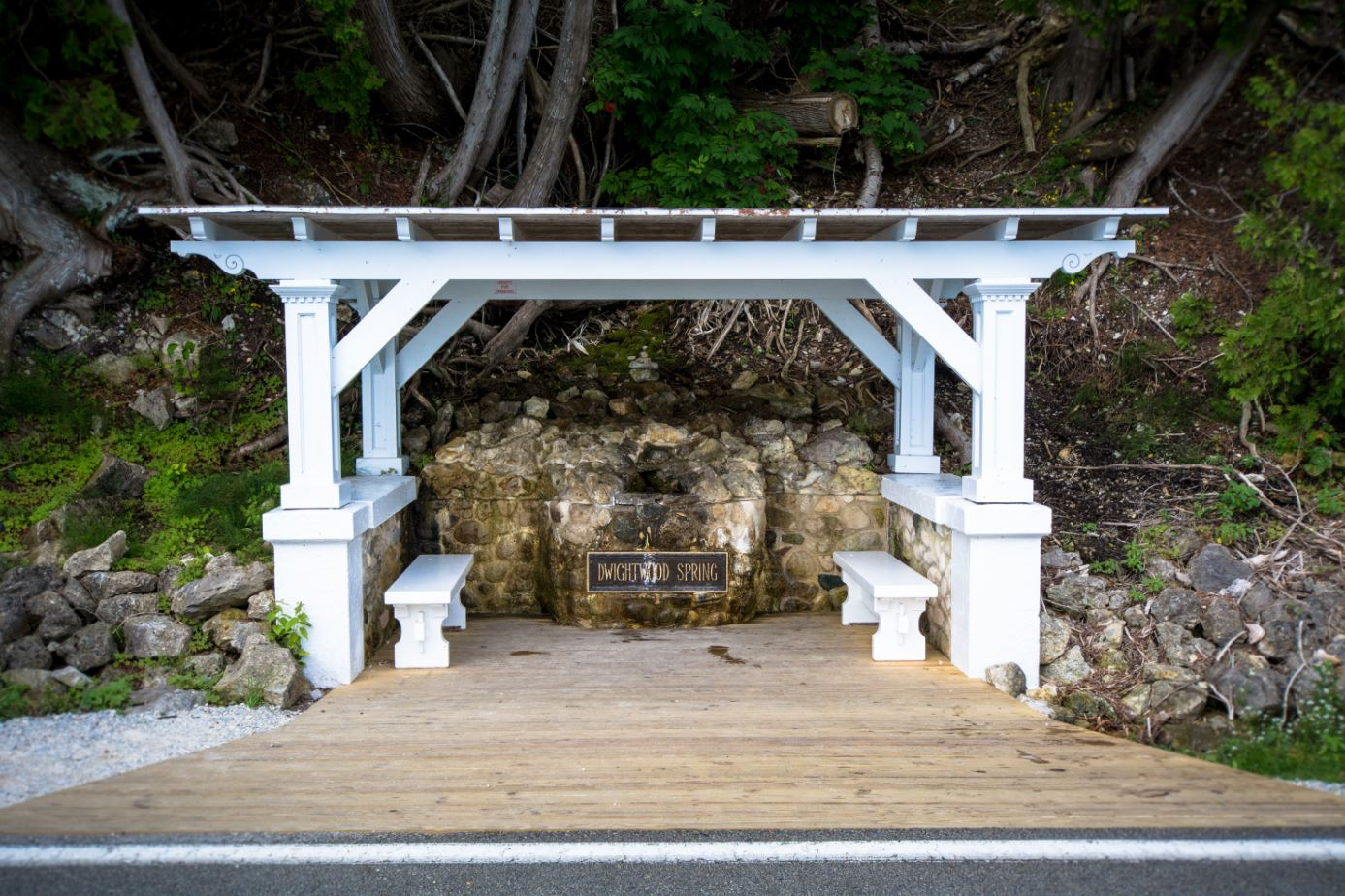
Dwightwood Spring, on Mackinac Island's eastern shore

The Relations also indicate the tremendous strategic importance of Michilimackinac/Mackinac Island as

"the central point for all travel on the upper Great Lakes, and for a vast extent of wilderness and half-settled country beyond" to First Nations and Europeans (prior to the arrival of railroads). The tribes which had inhabited Mackinac Island had been driven away by the Iroquois, leaving the island practically deserted until 1670. The Huron people from Lake Superior, in fear of the Sioux, retreated to the shore north of Mackinac Island. Here Marquette continued his missionary labors with them at the site of the present St. Ignace. The 1688 memoir of Jacques-René de Brisay de Denonville, Marquis de Denonville, claimed that the French had inhabited the area since 1648. A small French garrison was sent there some time between 1679 and 1683.

The name of Michilimackinac (later abbreviated to Mackinac) was applied generally to the entire vicinity, as well as specifically to the post at St. Ignace. Later still it was applied to the fort and mission established on the south side of the Straits of Mackinac.

Although the British built Fort Mackinac to protect their settlement from attack by French-Canadians and native tribes, the fort was never attacked during the American Revolutionary War. The entire Straits area was officially acquired by the United States through the Treaty of Paris (1783). However, Britain kept forces in the Great Lakes area until after 1794, when the Jay Treaty between the nations established U.S. sovereignty over the Northwest Territory.

=== Nineteenth century to present ===
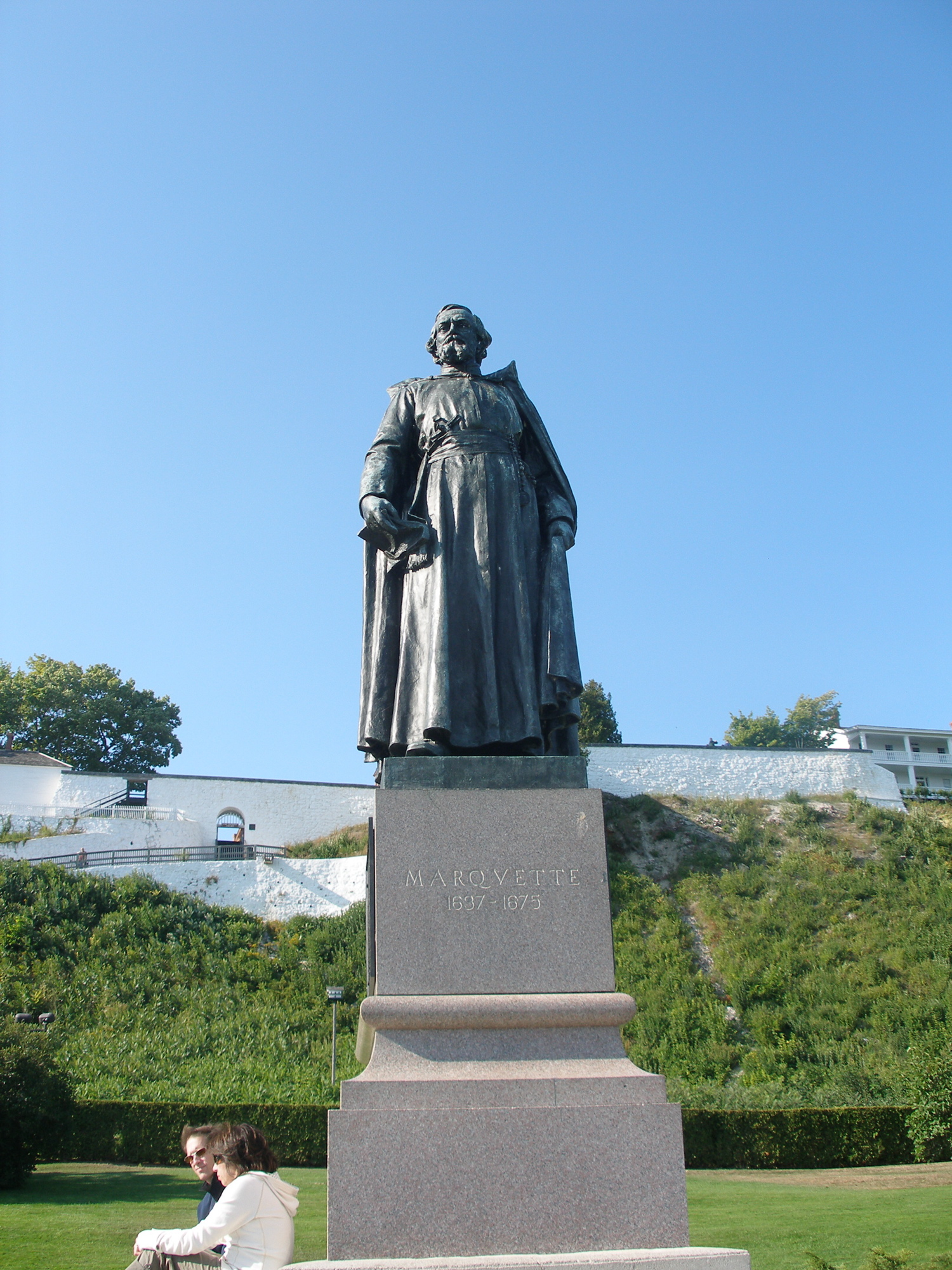
The statue of Jacques Marquette, Jesuit priest and Great Lakes explorer, in front of Fort Mackinac

During the War of 1812, the British captured the fort in the siege of Fort Mackinac, the first battle of the conflict. The Americans were caught by surprise, not knowing that war had been declared. The victorious British attempted to protect their prize by building Fort George on the high ground behind Fort Mackinac. In 1814, the Americans and British fought a second battle on the north side of the island. The American second-in-command, Major Andrew Holmes, was killed and the Americans failed to recapture the island. The federal fur trade station at Mackinac, which had been established by the United States government in 1808, was then taken over by the British.

By the Treaty of Ghent of 1815, the British returned the island and surrounding mainland to the U.S. The United States reoccupied Fort Mackinac, and renamed Fort George as Fort Holmes after Major Holmes. The fort remained under control of the United States government until 1895. It provided volunteers to defend the Union during the American Civil War, and was used as a prison for three Confederate States of America sympathizers.

John Jacob Astor's American Fur Company was centered on Mackinac Island after the War of 1812 and exported beaver pelts for 30 years. By the middle of the nineteenth century, commercial fishing for common whitefish and lake trout began to replace the fur trade as the island's primary industry. As sport fishing became more popular in the 1880s, hotels and restaurants accommodated tourists coming by train or lake boat from Detroit.

Between 1795 and 1815, a network of Métis settlements and trading posts was established throughout what is now the U.S. states of Michigan and Wisconsin and to a lesser extent in Illinois and Indiana. As late as 1829, the Métis were dominant in the economy of present-day Wisconsin and Northern Michigan. Many Métis families are recorded in the U.S. Census for the historic Métis settlement areas along the Detroit and St. Clair rivers, Mackinac Island and Sault Ste. Marie, Michigan, as well as Green Bay in Wisconsin. Many prominent mixed-race families, such as the Mitchell family of Mackinac, were formed in the late 18th- and early 19th-century fur trading era. The Métis have generally not organized as an ethnic or political group in the United States as they have in Canada, where they had armed confrontations in an effort to secure a homeland. The Village of Mackinac was incorporated in 1847.

Following the Civil War, the island became a popular tourist destination for residents of major cities on the Great Lakes. Much of the federal land on Mackinac Island was designated as the second national park, spearheaded by the efforts of Dr. John R. Bailey, Mackinac National Park, in 1875, three years after Yellowstone National Park was named as the first national park. This was thanks to U.S. Senator Thomas W. Ferry, who was born on the Island and lobbied for the park. To accommodate an influx of tourists in the 1880s, the boat and railroad companies built hotels, including the Grand Hotel. Island residents established souvenir shops to profit from the tourist trade. Many wealthy business magnates built summer "cottages" along the island's bluffs for extended stays.

When the federal government left the island in 1895, it transferred all of the federal land, including Fort Mackinac, to the state of Michigan and this area was designated as Michigan's first state park. The Mackinac Island State Park Commission, appointed to oversee the island, has restricted private development in the park. Leaseholders are required to maintain the island's distinctive Victorian architecture.

Motor vehicles were restricted at the end of the nineteenth century because of concerns for the health and safety of the island's residents and horses after local carriage drivers complained that automobiles startled their horses. This ban continues to the present, with exceptions only for city emergency vehicles (ambulance, police cars and fire trucks), city service vehicles, state park vehicles, and snowmobiles in winter. Thus, some controversy ensued in 2019 when Vice President Mike Pence was permitted to bring a motorcade to the island.

== Demographics ==
According to the 2020 United States census, the island has a year-round population of 583. The population grows considerably during the summer from tourists and seasonal workers, with many citizens from Jamaica providing vital services to the island during peak season. Hotels, restaurants, bars and retail shops hire hundreds of seasonal workers to accommodate the tens of thousands of visitors that visit the island between May 1st and October 31.

== Geography ==
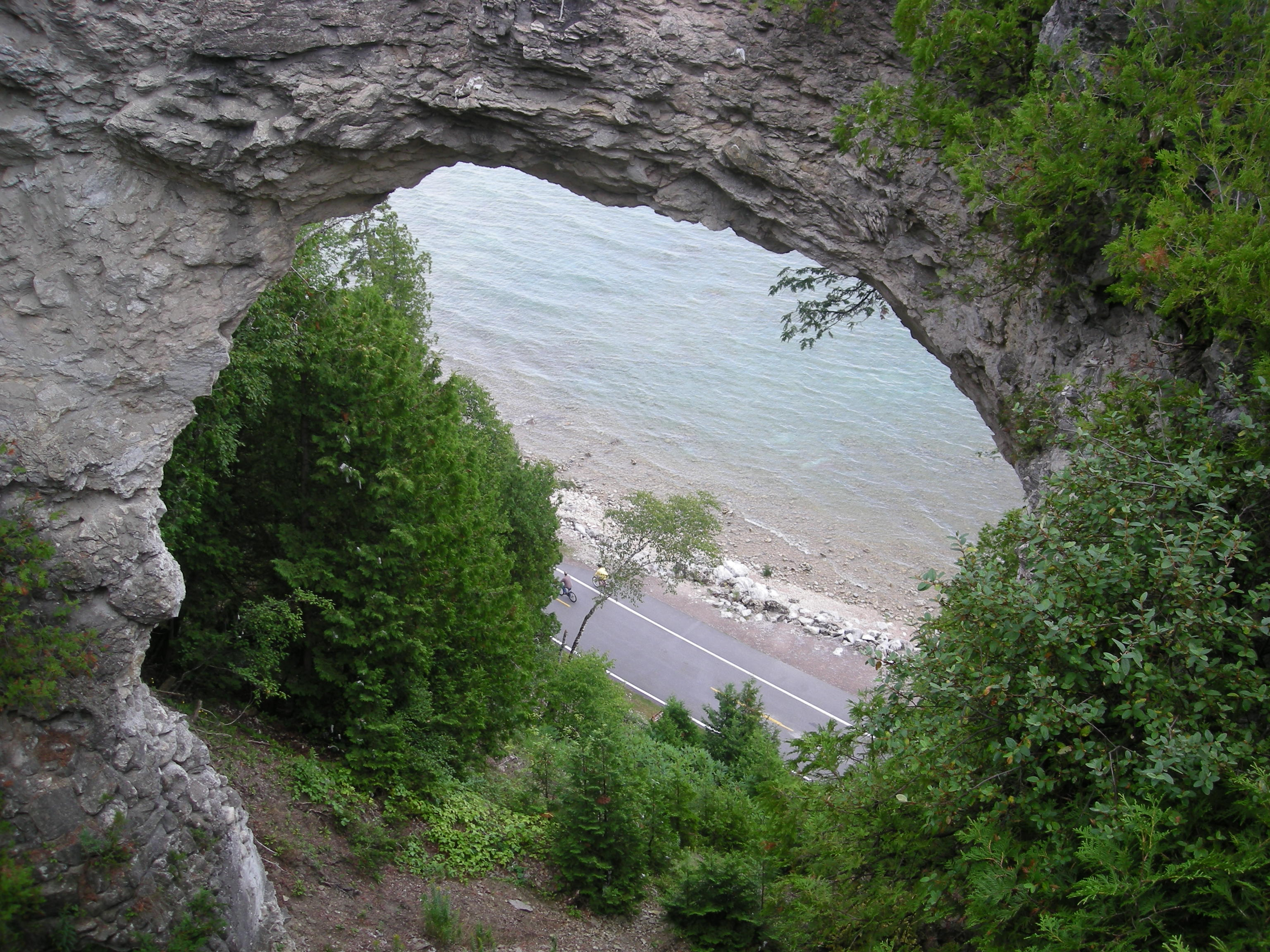
A view of M-185 through Arch Rock

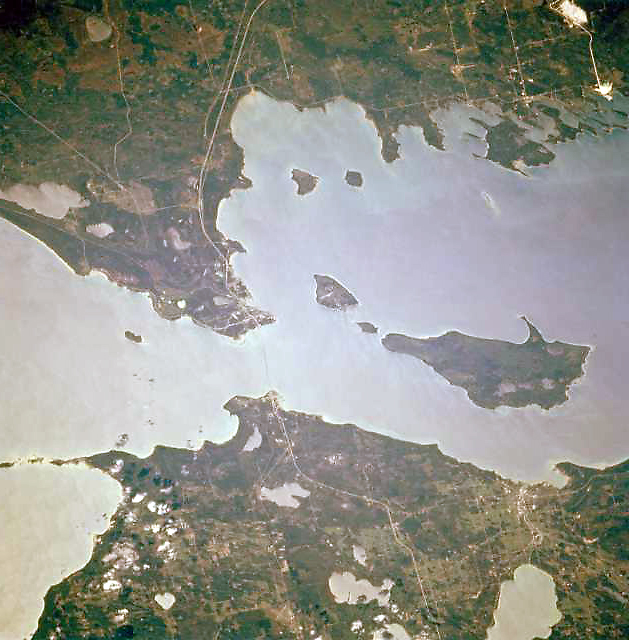
Mackinac Island is the top-left island of the three islands just to the east (right) of the Straits of Mackinac.

Mackinac Island is located in Lake Huron at the eastern end of the Straits of Mackinac, between the state's Upper and Lower Peninsulas. It is about 8 miles (13 km) in circumference and 3.8 square miles (9.8 km^{2}) in total area. The highest point of the island is the historic Fort Holmes (originally called Fort George by the British before 1815), which is 320 feet (98 m) above lake level and 890 feet (271 m) above sea level.

=== Geology ===
Mackinac Island was formed as the glaciers of the last ice age began to melt around 13,000 BC. The bedrock strata that underlie the island are much older, dating to Late Silurian and Early Devonian time, about 400 to 420 million years ago. Subsurface deposits of halite (rock salt) dissolved, allowing the collapse of overlying limestones; these once-broken but now solidified rocks comprise the Mackinac Breccia. The melting glaciers formed the Great Lakes, and the receding lakewaters eroded the limestone bedrock, forming the island's steep cliffs and rock formations. At least three previous lake levels are known, two of them higher than the present shore: Algonquin-level lakeshores dating to about 13,000 years ago and the Nipissing-level shorelines formed 4,000 to 6,000 years ago. During an intermediate period of low water between these two high-water stages, the Straits of Mackinac shrank to a narrow gorge that discharged its water over Mackinac Falls, located just east of the island (beyond Arch Rock), into Lake Huron.

As the Great Lakes assumed their present levels, the waterfall was inundated and Mackinac Island took on its current size. The steep cliffs were one of the primary reasons for the British army's choice of the island for a fortification. Their decision differed from that of the French army, which had built Fort Michilimackinac about 1715 near present-day Mackinaw City. The limestone formations are still part of the island's appeal. One of the most popular geologic formations is Arch Rock, a natural limestone arch, 146 feet (45 m) above the ground. Other popular geologic formations include Devil's Kitchen, Skull Cave, and Sugar Loaf.

=== Nature ===
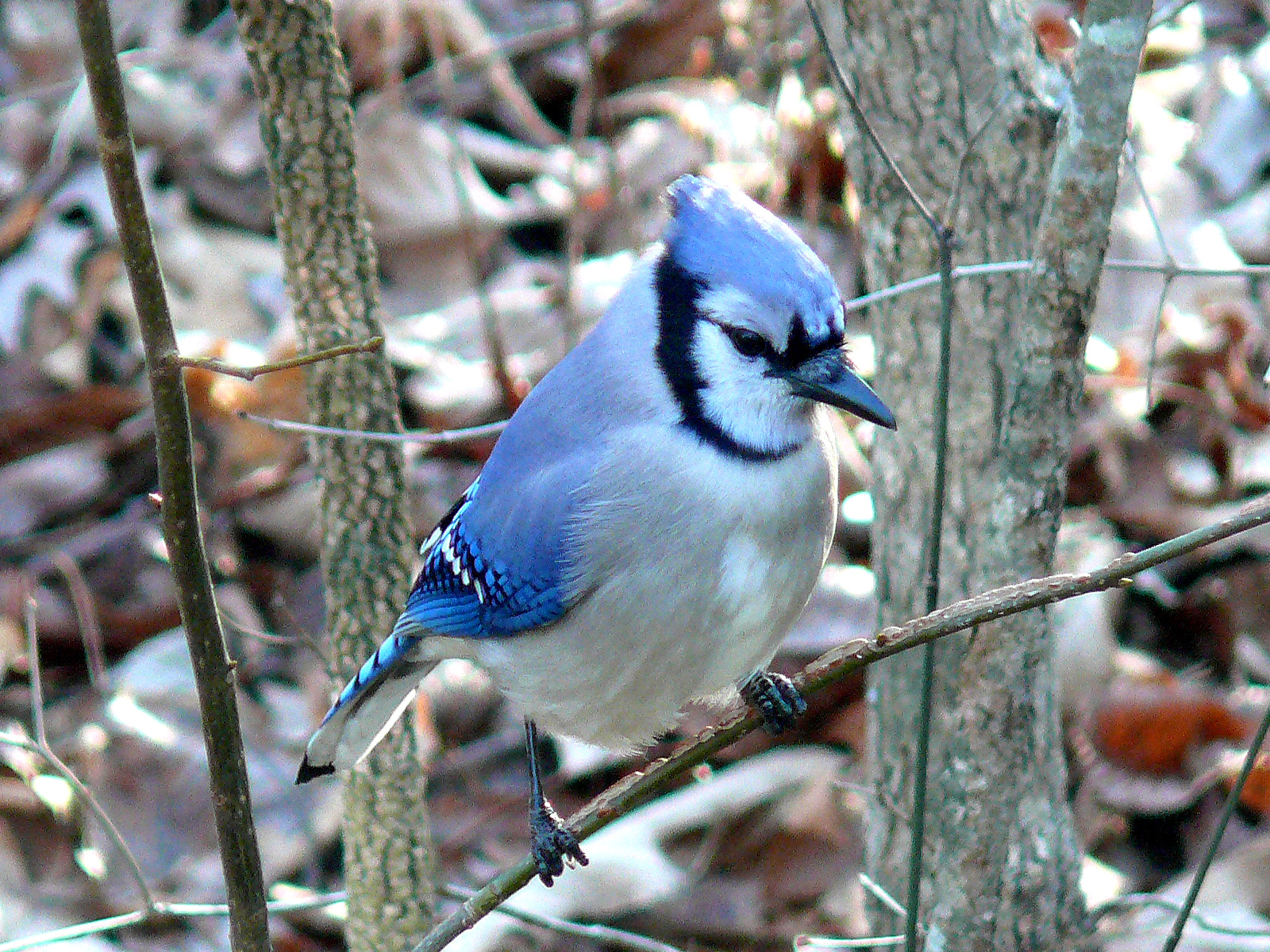
A blue jay, one of Mackinac Island's resident birds

Mackinac Island contains a wide variety of terrain, including fields, marshes, bogs, coastline, boreal forest, and limestone formations. The environment is legally preserved on the island by the State Historic Park designation. About half of the shoreline and adjacent waters off Mackinac Island, including the harbor (Haldimand Bay) and the southern and western shore from Mission Point to Pointe aux Pins, is protected as part of the Straits of Mackinac Shipwreck Preserve, a state marine park. As it is separated from the mainland by 3 miles (4.8 km) of water, few large mammals inhabit the island, except those that traverse the ice during the winter months. Rabbits, fox, raccoons, otters, mink, gray and red squirrels, and chipmunks are all common, as are the occasional beaver and coyote. Bats are abundant on the island, as it has numerous caves that serve as dwellings for them and a large insect population for the bats to prey on.

The island is frequented by migratory birds on their trips between their summer and winter habitats, as it lies on a major migration route. Eagles and hawks are abundant in April and May, while smaller birds such as yellow warblers, American redstart, and indigo bunting are more common in early summer. Near the shoreline, gulls, herons, geese, and loons are common. Owls, including snowy owls and great grey owls, come to the island from the Arctic to hunt in the warmer climate. Other birds, such as chickadees, cardinals, blue jays, and woodpeckers, live on the island year-round. Toads have also been found.

Mackinac Island contains over six hundred species of vascular plants. Flowering plants and wildflowers are abundant, including trillium, lady slippers, forget-me-nots, violets, trout lily, spring beauty, hepatica, buttercups, and hawkweeds in the forests and orchids, fringed gentian, butter-and-eggs, and jack-in-the-pulpit along the shoreline. The island's forests are home to many varieties of trees, such as maple, birch, elm, cedar, pine, and spruce.

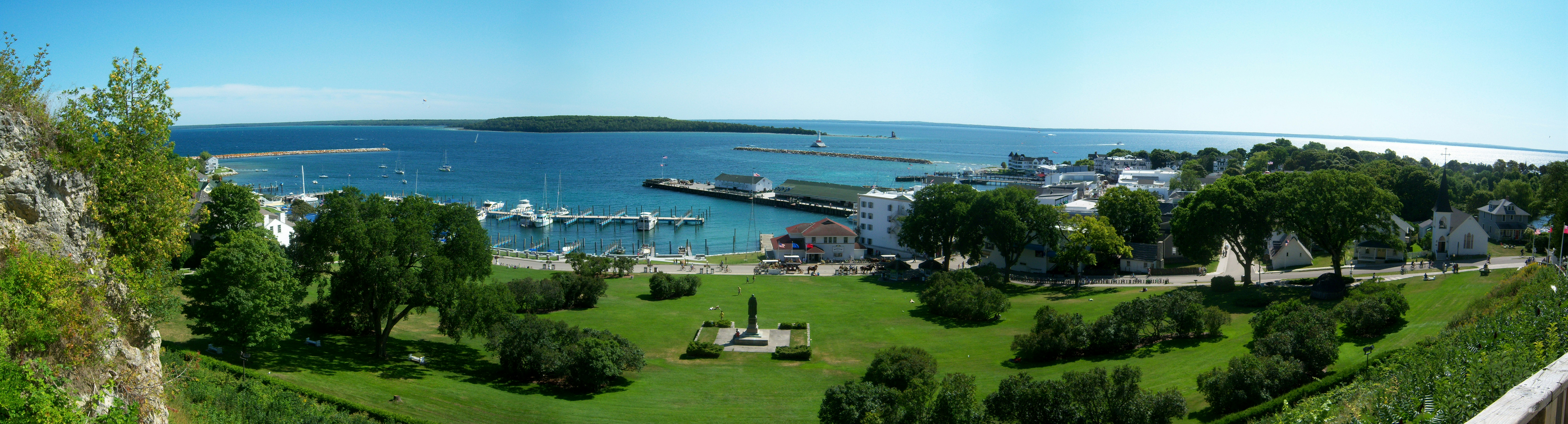
Marquette Park on Mackinac Island

== Media ==
The island's newspaper is the Mackinac Island Town Crier. It has been owned and operated by Wesley H. Maurer Sr. and his family since 1957 as training for journalism. It is published weekly from May through September and monthly during the rest of the year.

== Transportation ==
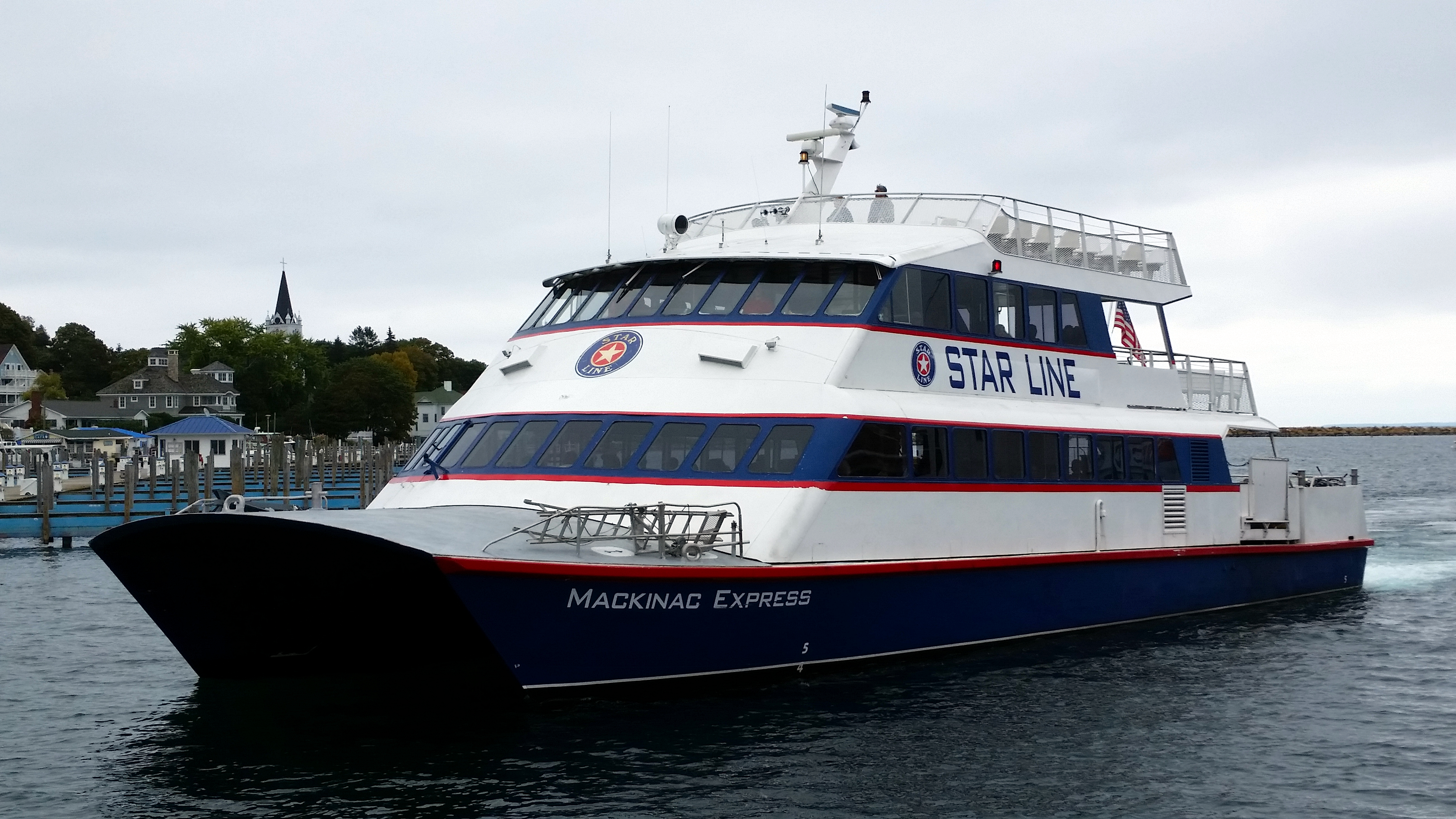
M/V Mackinac Express, a high-speed catamaran ferry used to transport people to and from the island

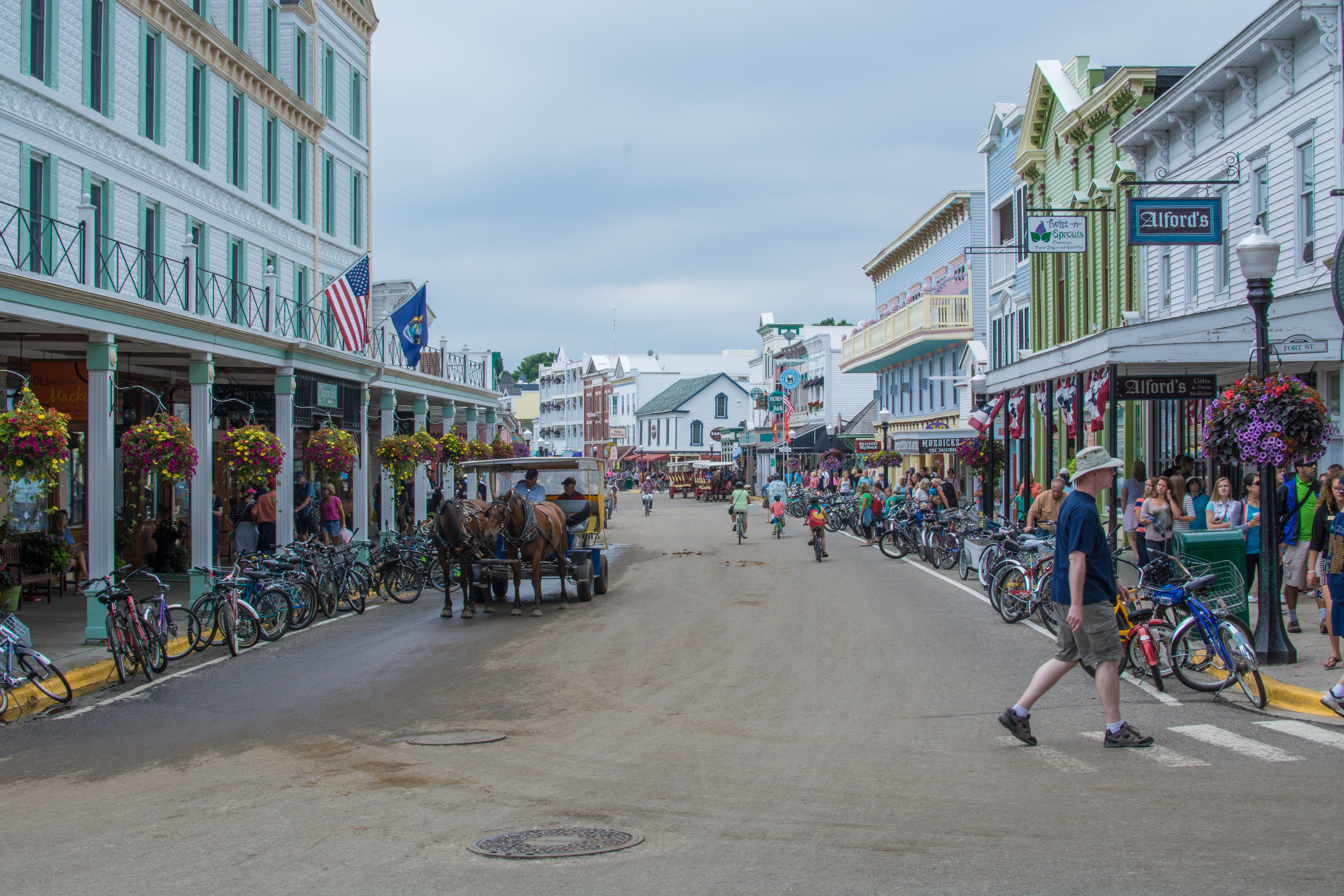
Mackinac Island's main street, looking west. Transportation on the island is by horse, bike, or foot.

The island can be reached by private boat, by ferry, by small aircraft and, in the winter, by snowmobile over an ice bridge. The airport has a 3,500-foot (1,070 m) paved runway, and daily charter air service from the mainland is available. In the summer tourist season, ferry service is available from Shepler's Ferry and Mackinac Island Ferry Company (formerly Star Line) to shuttle visitors to the island from St. Ignace and Mackinaw City.

Motorized vehicles have been prohibited within the City of Mackinac Island since 1898, and on the island since 1901, following the banning by the Mackinac Island State Park Commission, with the exception of city emergency vehicles (ambulance, police cars and fire trucks), city service vehicles and snowmobiles during winter. Travel on the island is either by foot, bicycle, horse or horse-drawn carriage. Roller skates and roller blades are also allowed, except in the downtown area. Bicycles, roller skates/roller blades, carriages, and saddle horses are available for rent.

An 8-mile (13 km) road follows the island's perimeter, and numerous roads, trails and paths cover the interior. M-185, the United States' only state highway without motorized vehicles, makes a circular loop around the island, closely hugging the shoreline.

Mackinac Island State Park covers approximately 80 percent of the area of the island and includes Fort Mackinac, as well as portions of the island's historic downtown and harbor. No camping is allowed on the island, but numerous hotels and bed and breakfasts are available.

The downtown streets are lined with many retail stores and restaurants.

== Architecture ==
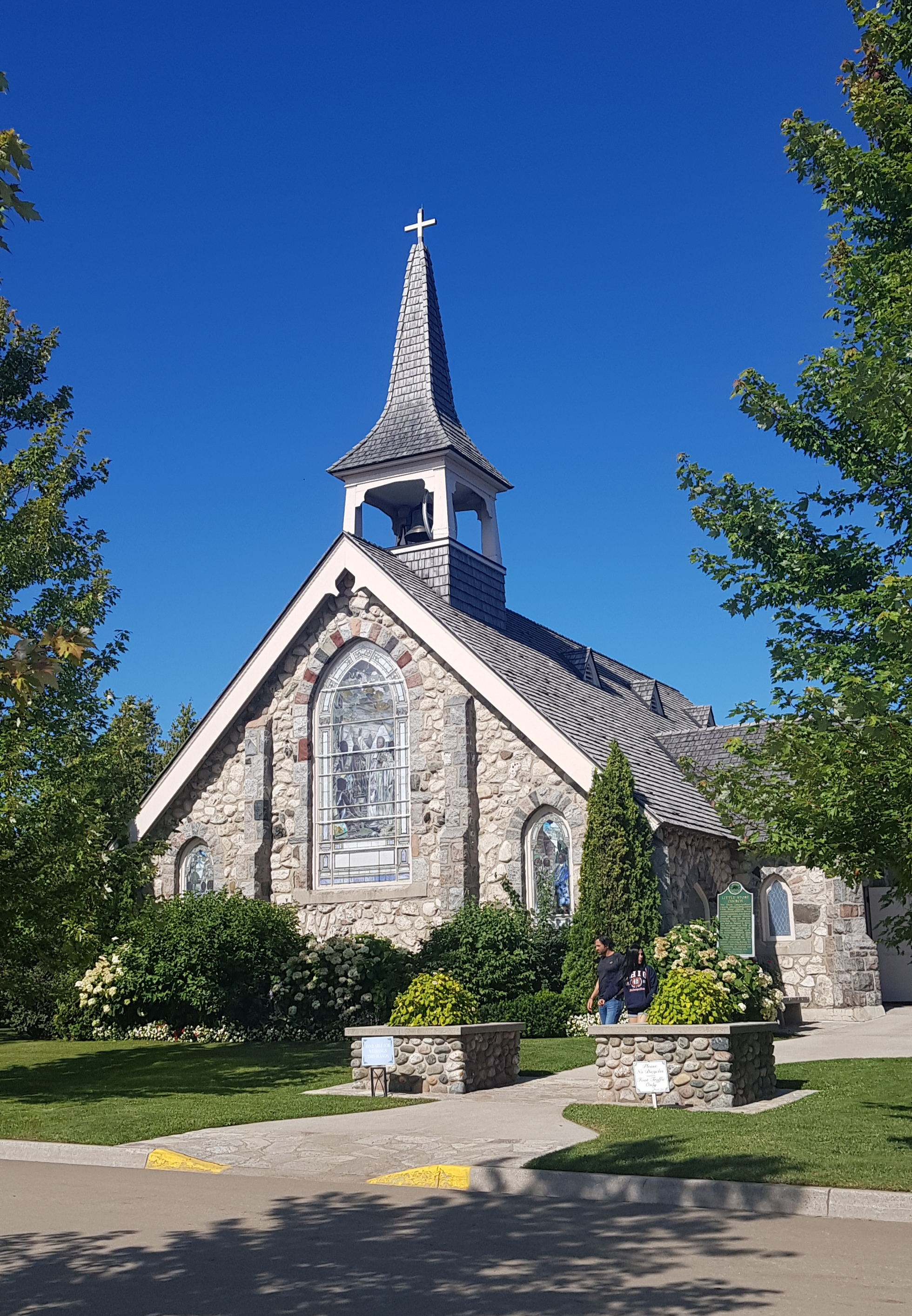
Little Stone Church on Mackinac Island

Most of the buildings on Mackinac Island are built of wood, a few are of stone, and most have clapboard siding. The architectural styles on the island span 300 years, from the earliest Native American structures to the European-American styles of the 19th century.

The earliest structures were built by the Anishinaabe and Ojibwe (also called Chippewa in the United States) tribes before European exploration. At least two buildings still exist from the original French settlement of the late 18th century. Mackinac Island has the only example of northern French rustic architecture in the United States, and one of few survivors in North America.

Mackinac Island also contains examples of Federalist, Colonial, and Greek Revival styles. Given its rise as a tourist destination in the late nineteenth century, many of the island's structures were built in the later style of the Victorian era, which includes Gothic Revival, Stick style, Italianate, Second Empire, Richardson Romanesque and Queen Anne styles. The most recent architectural styles date from the late 19th century to the 1930s and include the Colonial and Tudor Revival.

== Points of interest ==
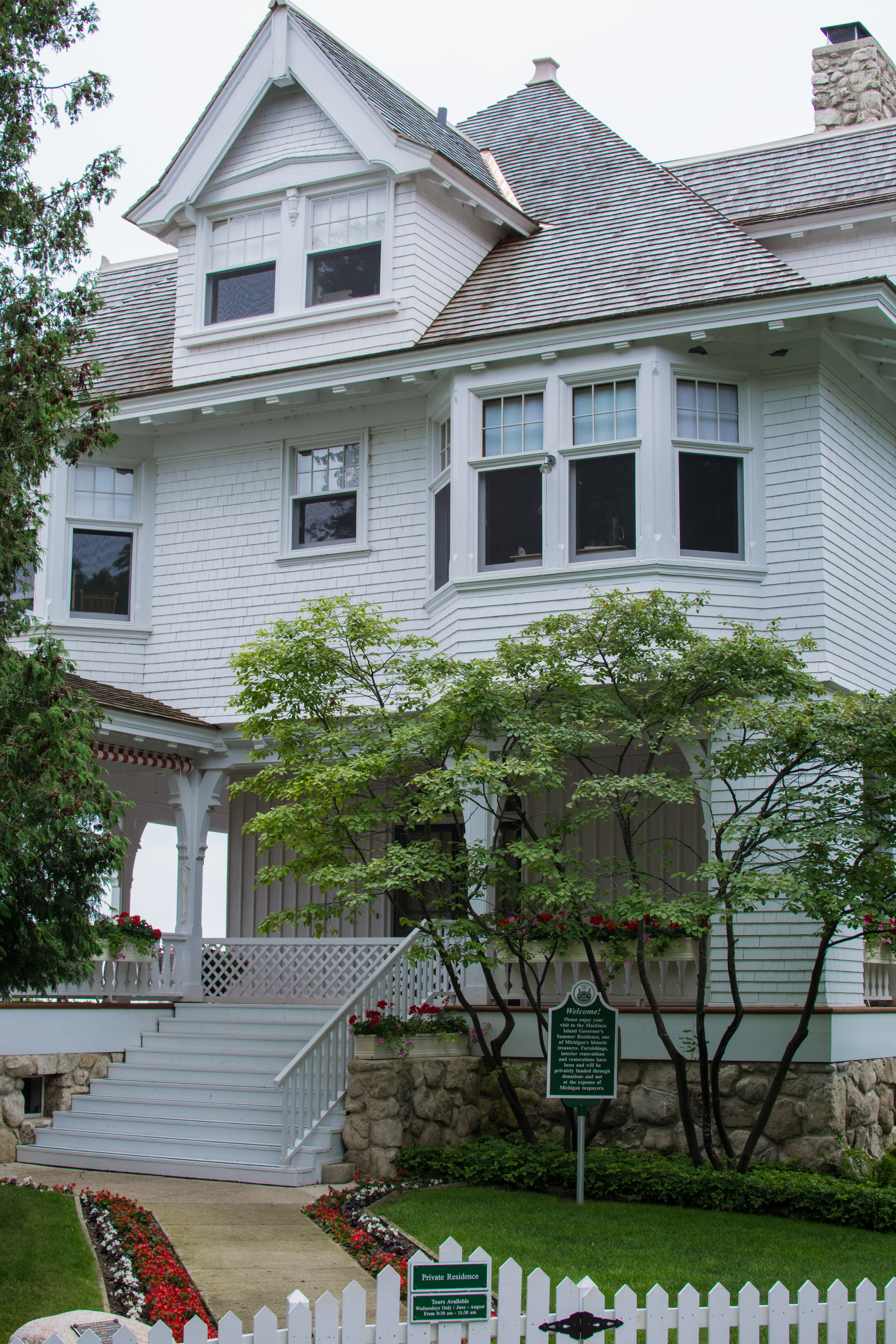
The Governors House on Mackinac Island. The Governor of Michigan, while in office, can use this residence as a vacation home.

All of Mackinac Island was listed as a National Historic Landmark in October 1960. In addition, because of the island's long history and preservation efforts starting in the 1890s, eight separate locations on the island, and a ninth site on adjacent Round Island, are listed in the United States National Register of Historic Places. In 2022 Travel + Leisure named Mackinac Island the best island in the continental U.S. to visit.

- The entire island, Haldimand Bay, and a small shipwreck form a historic district.
- Built by the British in 1780, Fort Mackinac was closed as a fort by the United States in 1895 as it no longer had any strategic purpose. It has been restored to its late 19th-century state through efforts beginning in the 1930s.
- The Biddle House, one of the oldest structures on Mackinac Island, was built about 1780 and is interpreted in its role as a prosperous home for the Métis Biddle family during the height of the fur trade in the 1820s.
- The McGulpin House, a working-class home possibly constructed prior to 1780, is interpreted as a frontier working-class home.
- The Agency House of the American Fur Company was built in 1820 as the residence for the company's Mackinac Island agent, Robert Stuart. It has been adapted as a fur trade museum and is open to the public.
- The Mission House was built on Mission Point in 1825 by Presbyterian missionary William Montague Ferry as a boarding school for Native American and Métis children. It became a hotel in 1849 and a rooming house in 1939. It is restored and now houses State Park employees.
- The 108-foot tall glassed-in Mission Point historical museum has five floors of historical exhibits and views of the Mackinac Straits. Exhibits include the maritime history of Mackinac Island, Great Lakes lighthouses, shipping, and shipwrecks, Mackinac Bridge construction, and the film Somewhere in Time, which was primarily filmed on Mission Point property.
- The Mission Church was built in 1829 and is the oldest surviving church building in Michigan. It has been restored to its 1830s appearance.
- The Indian Dormitory was constructed under direction of U.S. Indian agent Henry Rowe Schoolcraft after the US and area tribes signed the 1836 Treaty of Washington. It operated as a school and a place for Native Americans to stay while coming to the island to receive yearly annuities. The building was restored in 1966 and converted to a museum; it closed in 2003. On July 2, 2010, the building was reopened for use as The Richard and Jane Manoogian Mackinac Art Museum. It showcases Mackinac art from prehistory to the present, and includes a children's art studio.
- The Matthew Geary House, built in 1846 as a private residence, was added to the NRHP in 1971. Privately owned, it is available for lease for vacation rentals.
- The current Catholic Sainte Anne Church was built from 1874. It replaced earlier parish churches in use on Mackinac Island and the adjacent mainland; the parish register records participants in sacraments such as baptisms, marriages, and funerals from 1695.
- The Grand Hotel is a Victorian-style structure that opened in 1887. The 1980 film Somewhere in Time was shot on location at the hotel.
- The Round Island Lighthouse is located just south of Mackinac Island on the small, uninhabited Round Island, which is held and operated by the US Forest Service. The light was built in 1894 and automated in 1924. Extensive restoration began in the 1970s, and the exterior and structure have since been repaired.
- Wawashkamo Golf Club was laid out in 1898 as a Scottish links-type course. It is the oldest continuously played golf course in Michigan.
- The Michigan Governor's Summer Residence was built overlooking the harbor in 1902. It was purchased by the state in 1943 for use as a seasonal governor's residence.
- Anne's Tablet is an Art Nouveau sculptural installation added to a blufftop overlook in 1916.
- Several children's parks have been established on the island. The most popular ones include the playground on the schoolyard; Marquette Park; and Great Turtle Park, which includes a baseball field, skate park, barbecue area, and a play set.

== Culture ==
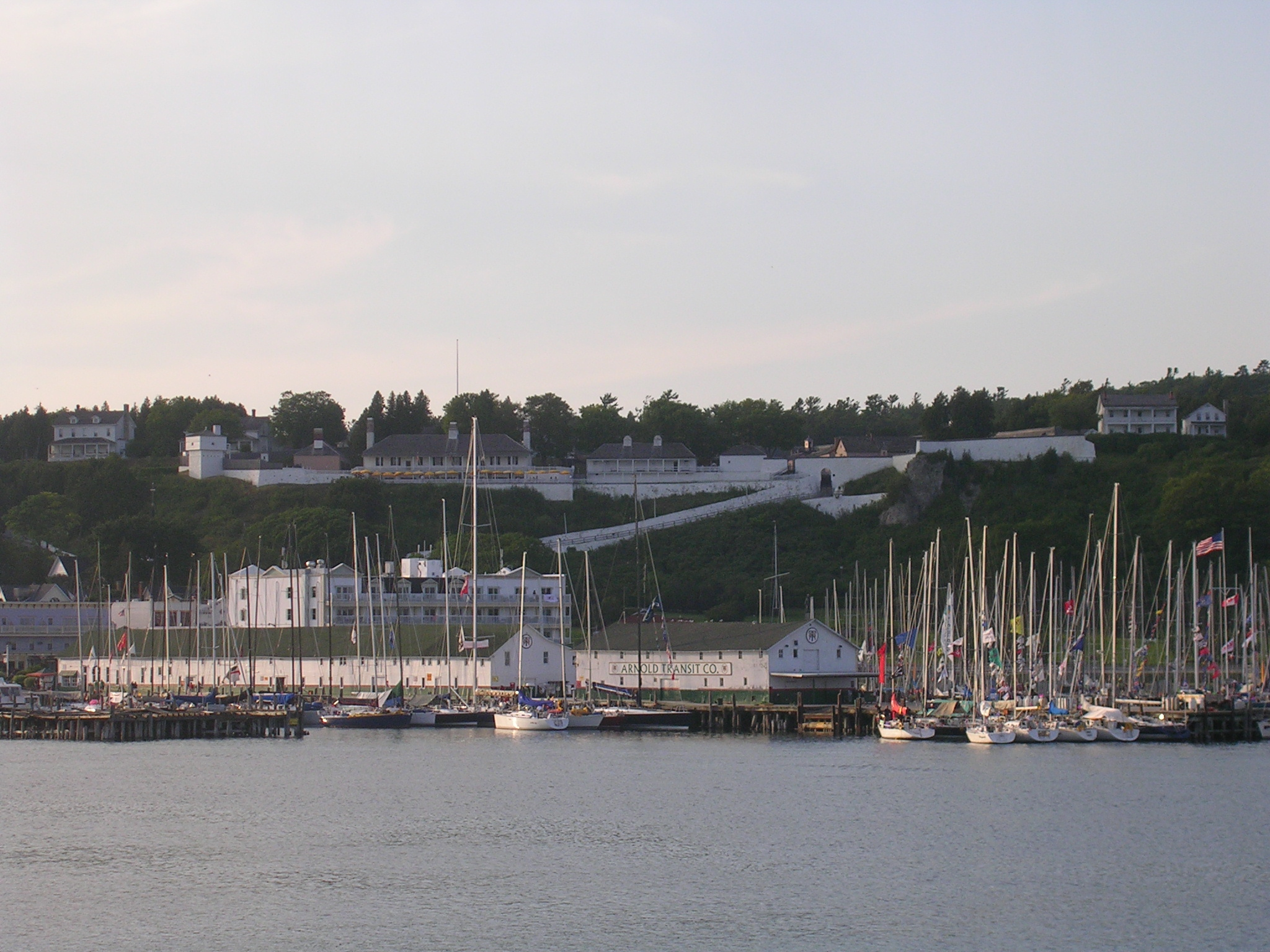
Harbor and Fort Mackinac, as seen entering the harbor

=== Events ===
Mackinac Island is home to many cultural events, including an annual show of American art from the Masco collection of 19th-century works at the Grand Hotel. Five art galleries operate on the island.

Since 1949, the island's residents have been celebrating the island's native lilacs with an annual spring 10-day festival. It culminates in a parade of horse-drawn vehicles, which has been recognized as a local legacy event by the Library of Congress.

The July 20, 2019, running of the Port Huron to Mackinac Boat Race was the 95th such annual event, with 202 sailboats registered in the 204-nautical mile-race from Port Huron to the island. The race was reported to have continued over the years in spite of wars and economic depressions. A similar sailboat race from Chicago to the island, most recently held on July 22 to 25, 2023, was the 114th event in the Chicago Yacht Club Race to Mackinac, with 266 sailboats competing.

The island is a destination for many regionally and nationally proclaimed conferences, including the Mackinac Policy Conference.

Another special event that Mackinac island is known for is the Mackinac Island Fudge Festival which takes place in August. Phil Porter wrote a book called "Fudge: Mackinac's Sweet Souvenir" which explains how fudge became such a popular treat in Mackinac. After the fur trade, this island became a summer vacationing spot. The visitors began to associate sweets with the island. It originally started when Native Americans began collecting maple sugar but in the 1800s the Murdick family created the first real candy store. The world faced sugar rations in the first half of the 20th century due to the Great Depression and wars that were taking place. The fudge shops in the island had very little business, but the Murdick family did not give up hope. They would use fans to send the scent of their fudge out into the community to draw in customers. In later years, major interstates were created and made Mackinac Island well known to many. Mackinac Island’s visitors became known as "fudgies" because their main reason to travel to the island was for their famous fudge. Although fudge was not invented on the island, it is a very popular treat that people would travel from all over to devour.

Epona, the Gallo-Roman Horse Goddess, is celebrated each June on Mackinac Island with stable tours, a blessing of the animals and the Epona and Barkus Parade. Mackinac Island does not permit personal automobiles; the primary source of transportation remains the horse, so celebrating Epona has special significance on this island. The "Feast of Epona" involves the blessing of horses and other animals by a local churchman.

=== Scout Service Camp ===
Every summer, Mackinac Island accommodates several Michigan Boy Scouts and Girl Scouts and their leaders over alternate weeks. These scouts serve the state park as the Mackinac Island Governor's Honor Guard. The program began in 1929, when the State Park Commission invited eight Eagle Scouts, including Gerald Ford, later President of the United States, to the island.

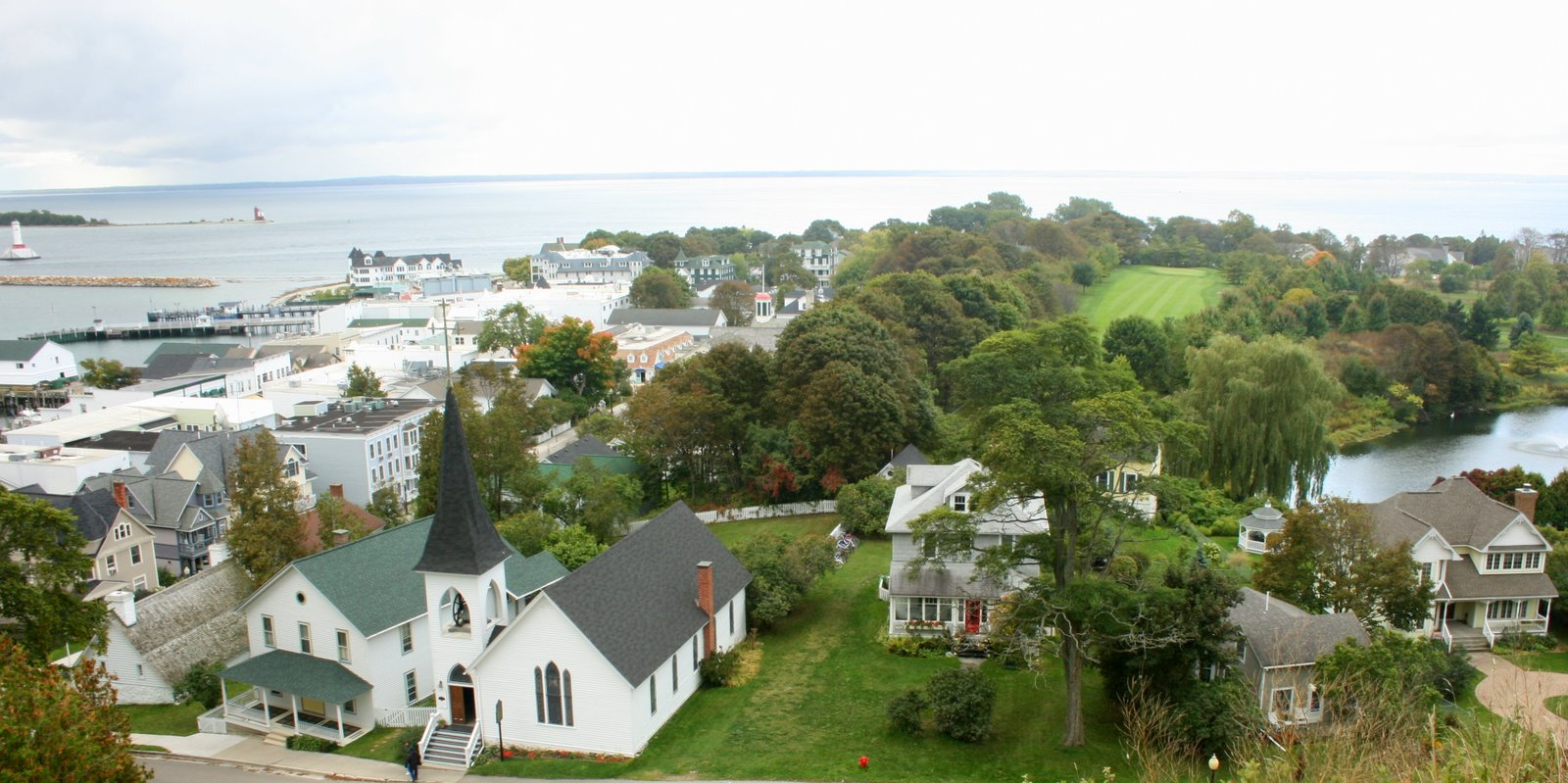
A view of the island from atop Fort Mackinac

In 1974, the program was expanded by Governor William Milliken to include Girl Scouts. The program is popular, selective, and a long-standing tradition. Scouts raise and lower twenty-seven flags on the island, serve as guides, and complete volunteer service projects during their stay. These Scouts live in the Scout Barracks behind Fort Mackinac.

=== Sailing ===
Mackinac Island is the destination for two sailing races. The island has a sailing club, the Mackinac Island Yacht Club. It serves as the finish line for both the Port Huron to Mackinac Race and the Chicago Yacht Club Race to Mackinac. The races are run a week apart, in July. They are both among the longest freshwater sailing races in the world and attract over 500 boats and 3,500 sailors combined. Both races are historical events, having been run every year since the 1920s.

=== Film and television ===
The swimming pool at the Grand Hotel is named for Esther Williams, who starred in the 1947 film This Time for Keeps. This featured many scenes filmed on Mackinac Island.

The majority of the 1980 film Somewhere in Time was filmed at Mission Point on Mackinac Island. Several landmarks are visible in the film, including the Grand Hotel and the lighthouse on nearby Round Island. The film's director said he needed to "find a place that looked like it hadn't changed in eighty years."

Mackinac Island was featured on two episodes of the mid-2000s TV series Dirty Jobs. Host Mike Rowe interviewed a Mackinac Bridge maintenance worker, and a horse manure and garbage removal/composting collector.

In the Netflix show Emily in Paris season 2, episode 6, Emily says that she went on a Vespa fudge tour with her mom around Mackinac Island when she was younger; however in real life Vespas aren't allowed on Mackinac Island.

== Notable people ==
- John Penn Arndt, merchant, member of the Wisconsin Territorial Legislature.
- William Beaumont, a surgeon in the U.S. Army who became known as the "Father of Gastric Physiology" following his research on human digestion.
- Agatha Biddle, Métis fur trader (specifically Odawa & French), and community leader.
- Sophie Biddle, Métis fur trader, and community leader. Daughter of Agatha Biddle.
- Gerald F. Bogan, Senior admiral during WWII and Navy Cross recipient.
- Michael Cudahy, meatpacking CEO and land developer.
- Peter Warren Dease, fur trader and Arctic explorer. Married into the Métis fur trade via his wife, Elizabeth Chouinard.
- Hercules L. Dousman, fur trader and real estate financier, son of Michael Dousman.
- Michael Dousman, fur trader and sawmill owner. Acquired the plot of farmland that was eventually developed into what is now the Wawashkamo Golf Club
- Frank Dufina, early Native American golf professional. Born on Mackinac Island and pro at Wawashkamo Golf Club. Was a descendant of the original Mishinimakinago and innumerated as a member of the Mackinac Island Band of Indians on the Durant Indian Rolls.
- Thomas W. Ferry, member of the United States House of Representatives from Michigan in 1865–1871, and of the United States Senate from Michigan in 1871–1883, was born on the island.
- William Montague Ferry, Presbyterian minister and missionary established a mission on the island.
- William Montague Ferry Jr., Michigan and Utah politician, was born on the island.
- John Warner Fitzgerald, lawyer and chief justice of the Michigan Supreme Court, was a summer resident.
- Porter Hanks, Artillery lieutenant in command of Fort Mackinac who surrendered the island to the British in July 1812.
- Jane Briggs Hart, aviator and wife of Senator Philip Hart.
- Philip Hart, member of the U.S. Senate from Michigan in 1959–1976. Buried at St. Anne's Catholic Cemetery.
- Gurdon Saltonstall Hubbard, fur trader and pioneer Chicago CEO.
- Madeline La Framboise, Métis fur trader and businesswoman, inducted in 1984 into the Michigan Women's Hall of Fame.
- Jacques Marquette, Jesuit priest and missionary.
- John McCabe, Shakespeare teacher, film historian, and biographer.
- Henry Rowe Schoolcraft, noted ethnographer and U.S. Indian agent, named many counties and places in Michigan in his official capacity; husband of Jane Johnston Schoolcraft.
- Jane Johnston Schoolcraft, ethnographer, translator, folklorist, and poet of mixed Ojibwa & Scots-Irish parentage; inducted in 2008 into the Michigan Women's Hall of Fame.
- Elizabeth Mitchell, Métis businesswoman.
- Alexis St. Martin, French fur trapper, and patient for William Beaumont's research.
- Elizabeth Whitney Williams, lighthouse keeper on the Great Lakes from 1872 to 1913
- G. Mennen Williams, governor of Michigan in 1949–1961. In fact, the state owns a residence on the island for the current governor's use; some governors use it extensively, while others have used it only for special occasions.

== See also ==
- Populated islands of the Great Lakes
- Love Valley, North Carolina, where automobiles are also banned
