= Biddle House (Mackinac Island) =

Historic house in Michigan, United States

- U.S. National Historic Landmark District – Contributing property
- Michigan State Historic Site
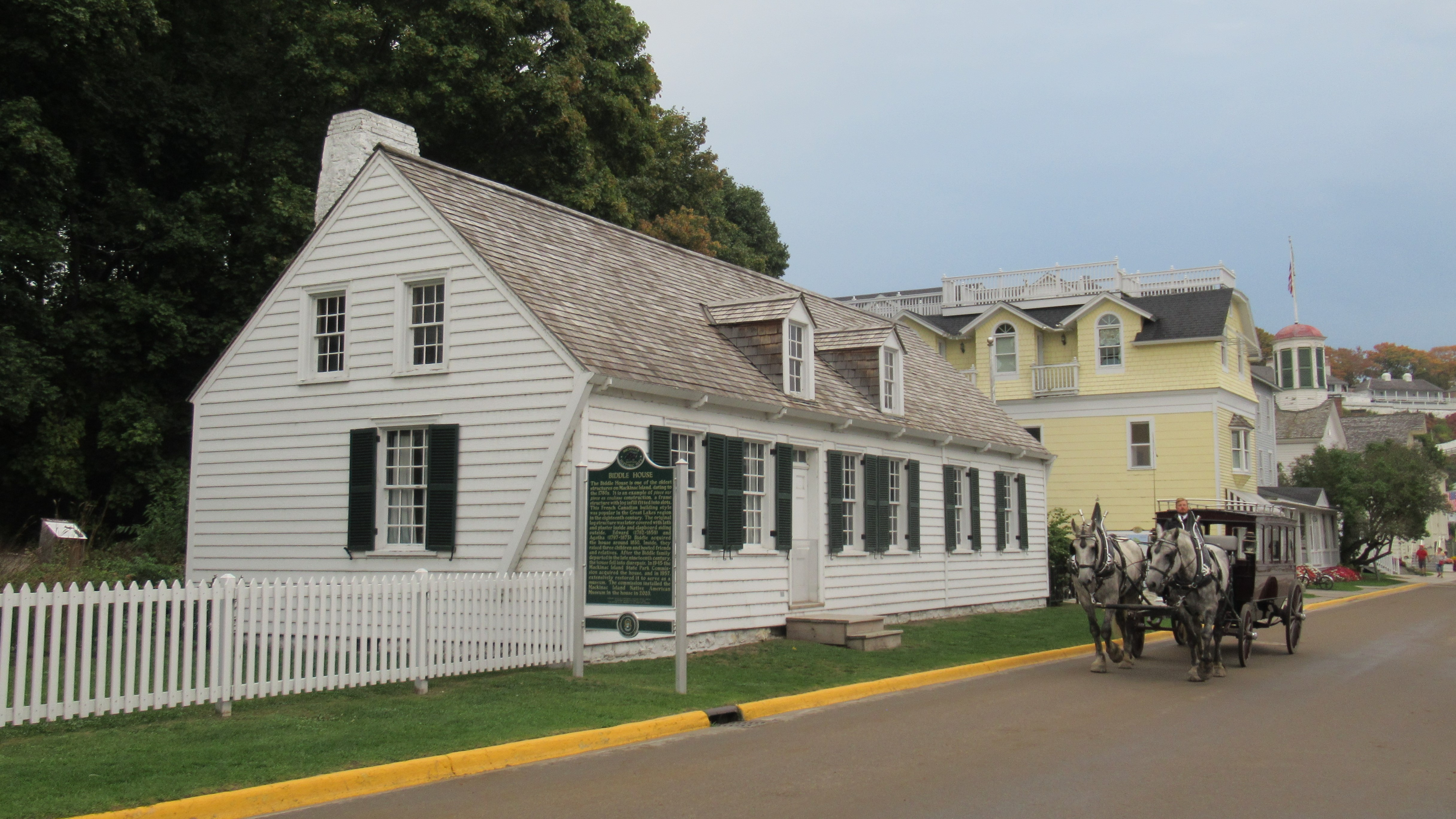

- Location within Michigan Location within the United States
- Location: Market Street; Mackinac Island, Michigan
- Coordinates: 45.84893°N 84.61946°W
- Part of: Mackinac Island (ID66000397)

Significant dates
- Designated NHLDCP: October 15, 1966
- Designated MSHS: July 19, 1956

The Biddle House is a historic house and fur trade shop space, built before 1800 on Market Street on Mackinac Island in the U.S. state of Michigan. It is part of Mackinac Island State Park. It is a Michigan Registered Site and a contributing resource to Mackinac Island's status as a National Historic Landmark.

== History and today ==
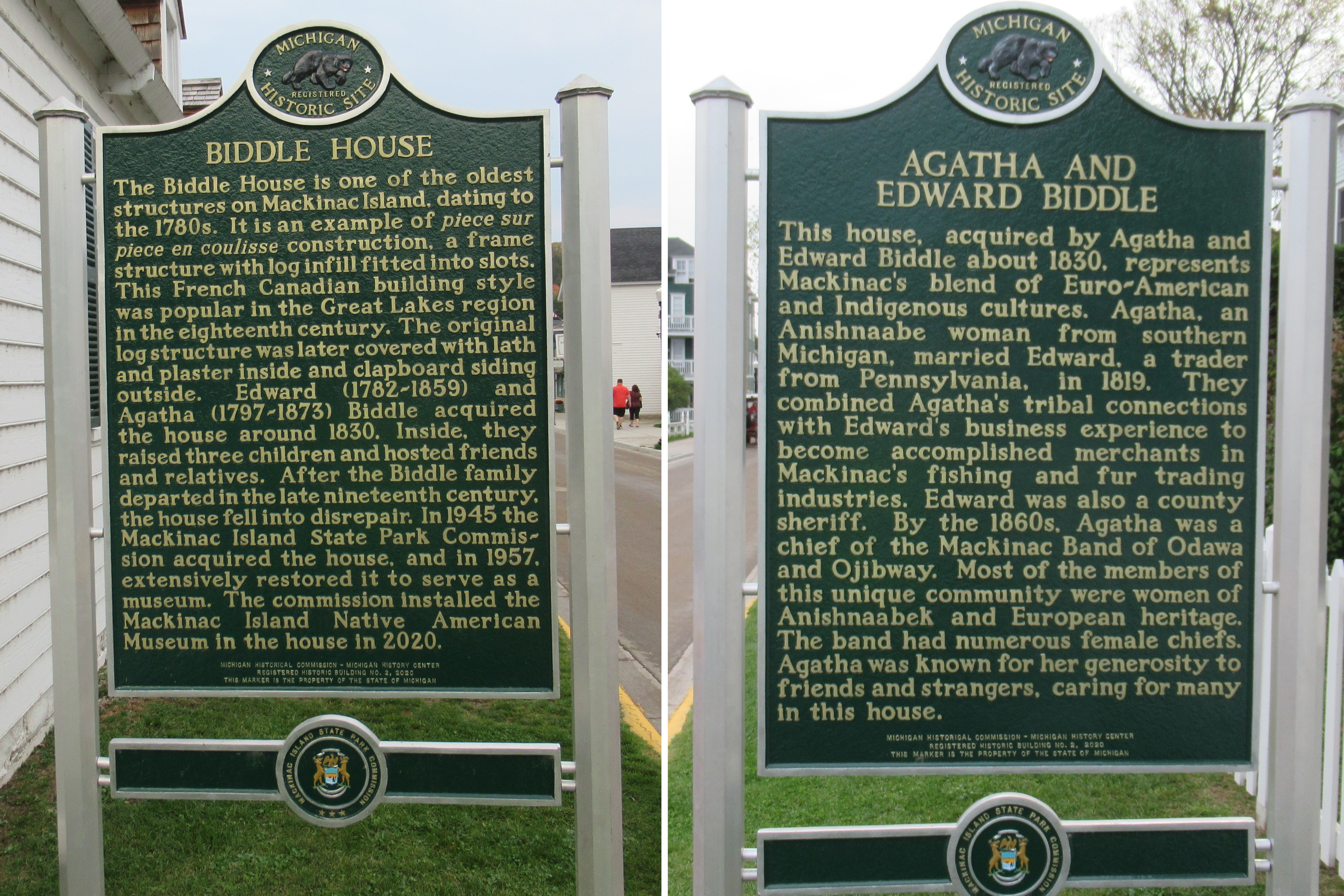
Dual-sided state historic marker

The origins of the Biddle House are unknown, but its New France architectural lines and heritage indicate that it was built about 1780, at the time of the first settlement of Mackinac Island by Euro-Americans. The American fur trade grew significantly on Mackinac Island after the War of 1812, and about 1822, fur trader Edward Biddle, a member of the Philadelphia-based Biddle family, occupied the house and refitted it to serve as a home for his family and a shop space to exchange trade goods for furs of the Upper Great Lakes ecosystem, including pelts from the beaver, mink, otter, and raccoon.

Edward Biddle's success in the fur trade was associated with two significant factors: his marriage to Agatha Biddle, a leading member of the Odawa nation who possessed an extensive regional kinship network, and his close ties with the then-dominant American Fur Company (AFC); most furs bought or sold by Edward and Agatha Biddle would also have passed through the hands of the AFC at some point. The Biddles bought the house outright in 1832.

The Biddle House, extensively restored in 1959, is part of the Mackinac Island State Park, and admission is by Fort Mackinac ticket. The State Park interprets the Biddle House to its appearance in the 1820s, when it was the prosperous Biddles' family home. Interpretation centers on displays celebrating the heritage of the Native Americans of the Straits of Mackinac, and a reconstructed period kitchen, where the process of early-19th century meal preparation is demonstrated in a working open-hearth fireplace.

== Listings ==
The Biddle House was listed as a Michigan Registered Site in 1960 as #HB02. A historic marker, posted adjacent to the Biddle House's front door, reads as follows:

This house is probably the oldest on the island. Parts of it may date from 1780. A deed to the property upon which a $100 down payment was made in 1822 by Edward Biddle was obtained by him in 1827 from the then owner. Biddle was a cousin of the Biddles of Philadelphia and a leading trader and citizen. For years he lived here with his Indian wife. The house is an example of the Quebec rural style. It is listed in the Historic American Buildings Survey and was restored by the Michigan Society of Architects and the building industry in 1959.
