= Devil's Kitchen (cave) =

Small cave on the shore of Mackinac Island in Michigan, United States

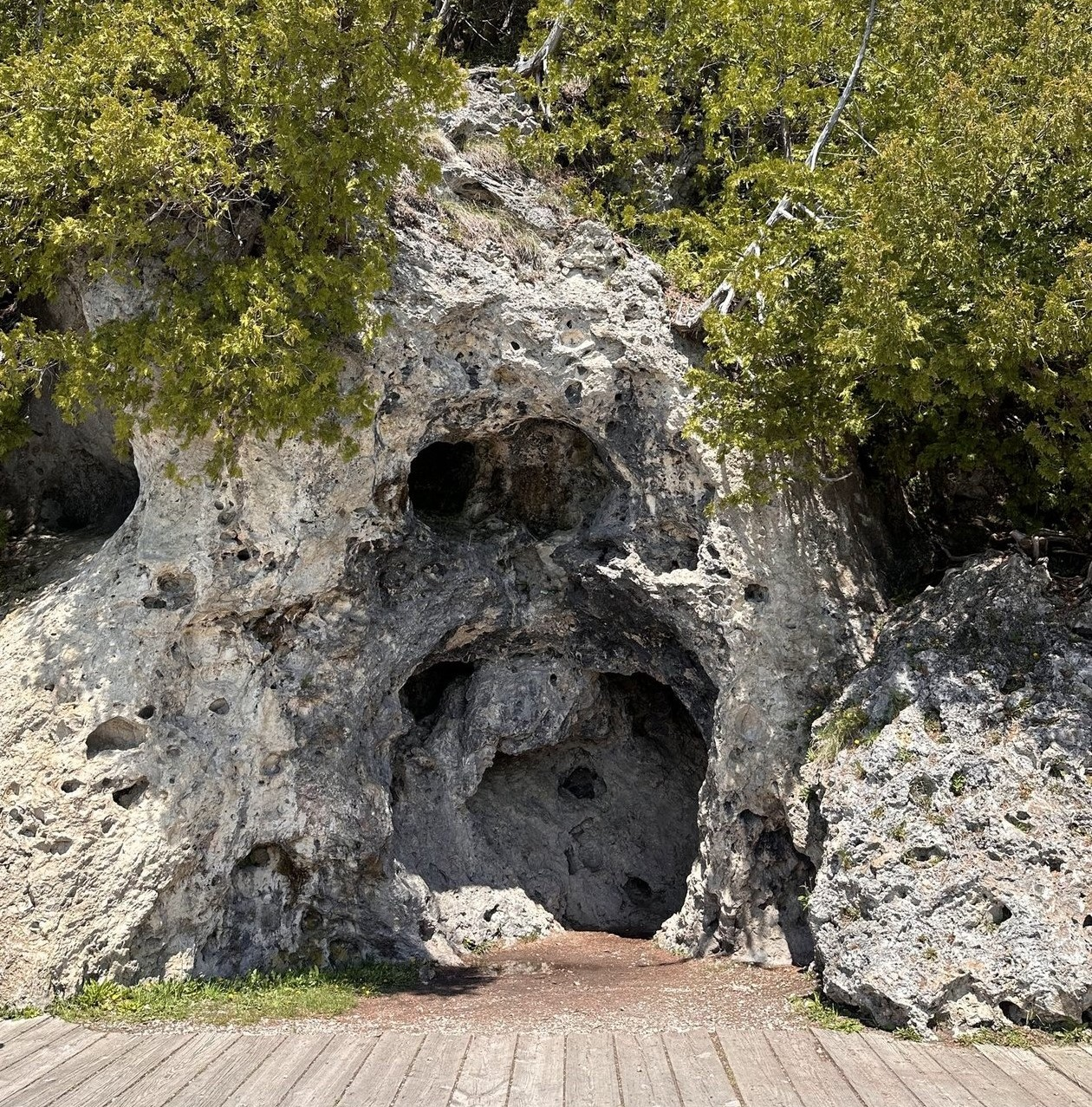

- Location within Michigan Location within the United States
- Location: Mackinac Island, Michigan
- Coordinates: 45°51′16.20″N 84°38′28.86″W
- Devil's Kitchen
- U.S. National Historic Landmark District – Contributing property
- Part of: Mackinac Island (ID66000397)
- Designated NHLDCP: October 15, 1966

Devil's Kitchen is a small cave on the southwestern shore of Mackinac Island in Michigan, United States. The cave was carved during the Nipissing post-glacial period by the waves of Lake Huron. It consists of two hollows in a rocky cliff, one directly on top of the other.

Mackinac Island's brecciated limestone has eroded into a variety of unusual formations. The cave's appearance is comparable to that of a human face with an open mouth.

Although shallow, Devil's Kitchen is much visited because of its location within Mackinac Island State Park on M-185, the state highway that circles Mackinac Island. Local stories allege that the Native Americans of the Straits of Mackinac considered the cave to be a numinous location inhabited by bad spirits. Allegedly, the spirits were cannibals who would capture and eat victims who ventured too close to the ill-omened location.

The cave is blackened with soot to this day, allegedly from the evil spirits' cooking fires; hence the name, 'Devil's Kitchen'. It is not known whether these stories derive from actual Native American legend or were generated after the beginning of the tourism industry on Mackinac Island in the mid-19th century.
