= Arch Rock (Mackinac Island) =

Coordinates: 45.857791°N 84.607267°W

- U.S. National Historic Landmark District – Contributing property
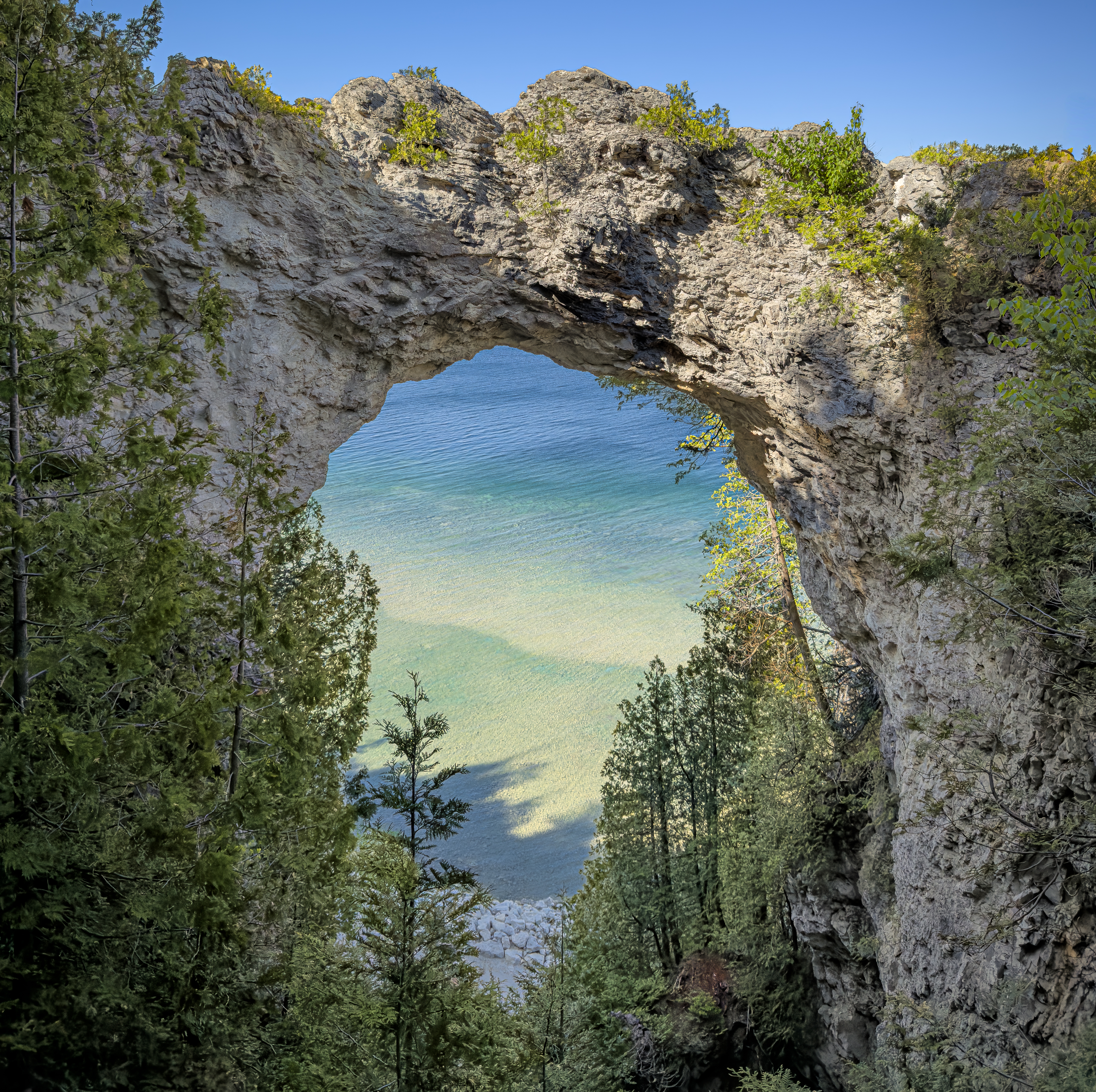
- Arch Rock pictured in 2026
- Location: Mackinac Island, Michigan
- Part of: Mackinac Island (ID66000397)
- Designated NHLDCP: October 15, 1966

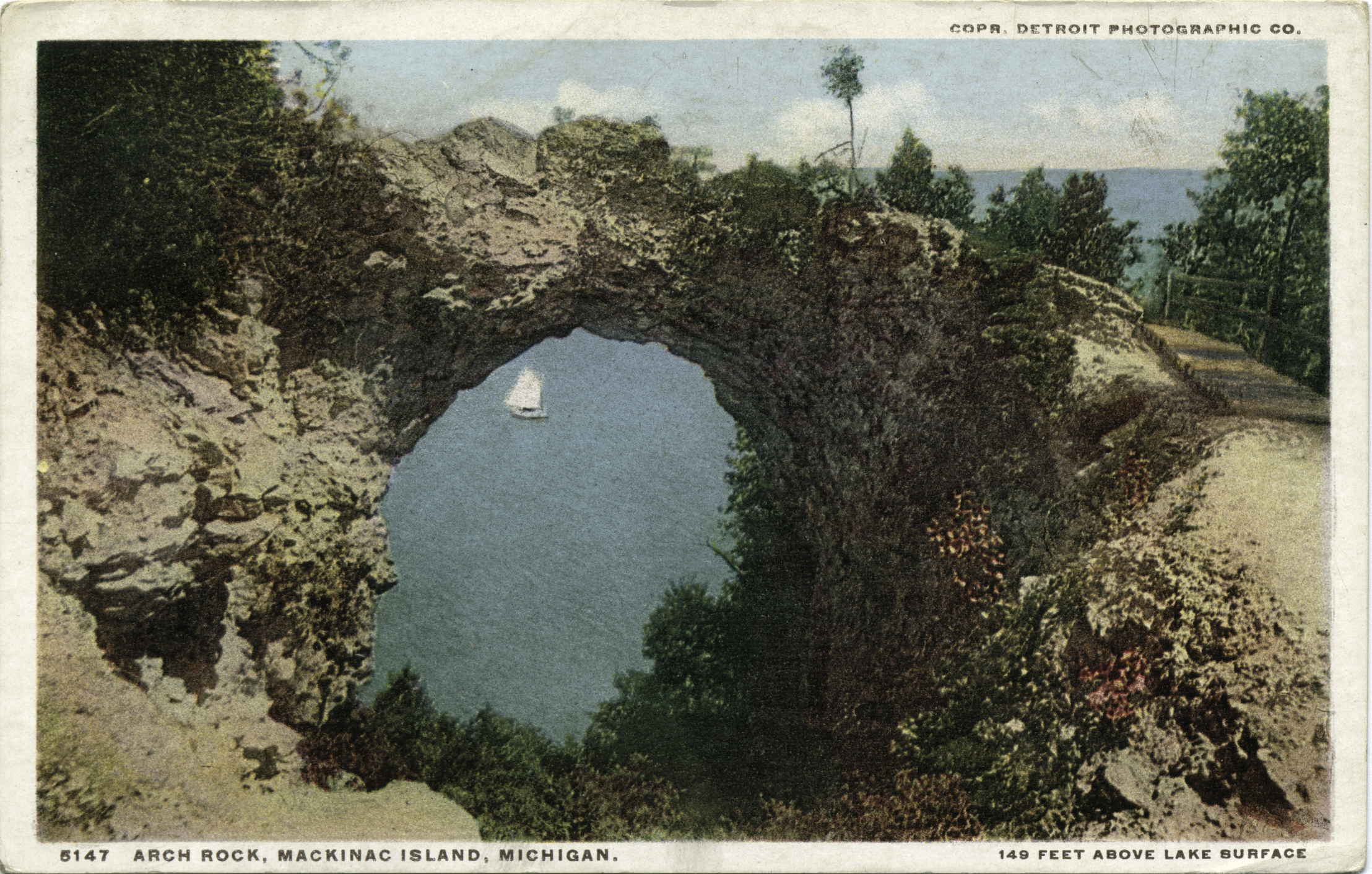
Postcard of Arch Rock in 1898

Map of Mackinac Island. Arch Rock is located on the southeast coast of the island.

Arch Rock is a geological formation on Mackinac Island in Michigan. It is a natural limestone arch formed during the Nipissing post-glacial period, a period of high Lake Huron levels following the end of the Wisconsin glaciation. To this day Arch Rock stands on the Lake Huron shoreline 146 feet (45 m) above the water.

Limestone breccia is not an ideal material for natural bridges, and this type of formation is quite rare in the North American Great Lakes region. The Native Americans saw Arch Rock as a place of numinous power, and told many stories and legends about it.

Euro-Americans did not share many of the taboos of their Native predecessors, and treated Arch Rock as a curiosity to be admired. One early chronicler was Alexis de Tocqueville who wrote of the "Giant's Arch" "of extraordinary shape" during his visit in August, 1831.

Its presence was a major element in the decisions to create Mackinac National Park in 1875 and its successor, Mackinac Island State Park, in 1895. Arch Rock has been a part of the State Park ever since. Today Arch Rock is a focus of Mackinac Island tourism, and is seen by many visitors to the Island. Several trails and paved roads, including the aptly named Arch Rock Road and Arch Rock Bicycle Trail, lead to the formation.
