= Mackinac National Park =

Former national park in Michigan, United States

Coordinates: 45.86666°N 84.61666°W

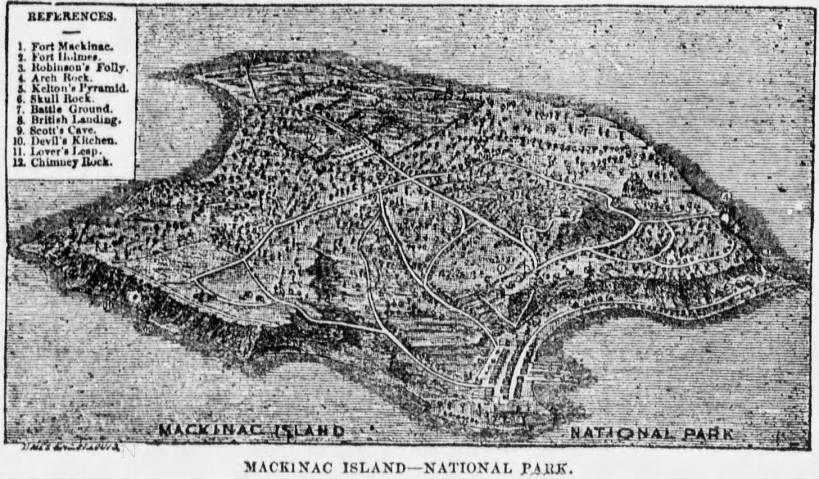
Map of Mackinac National Park published in 1890

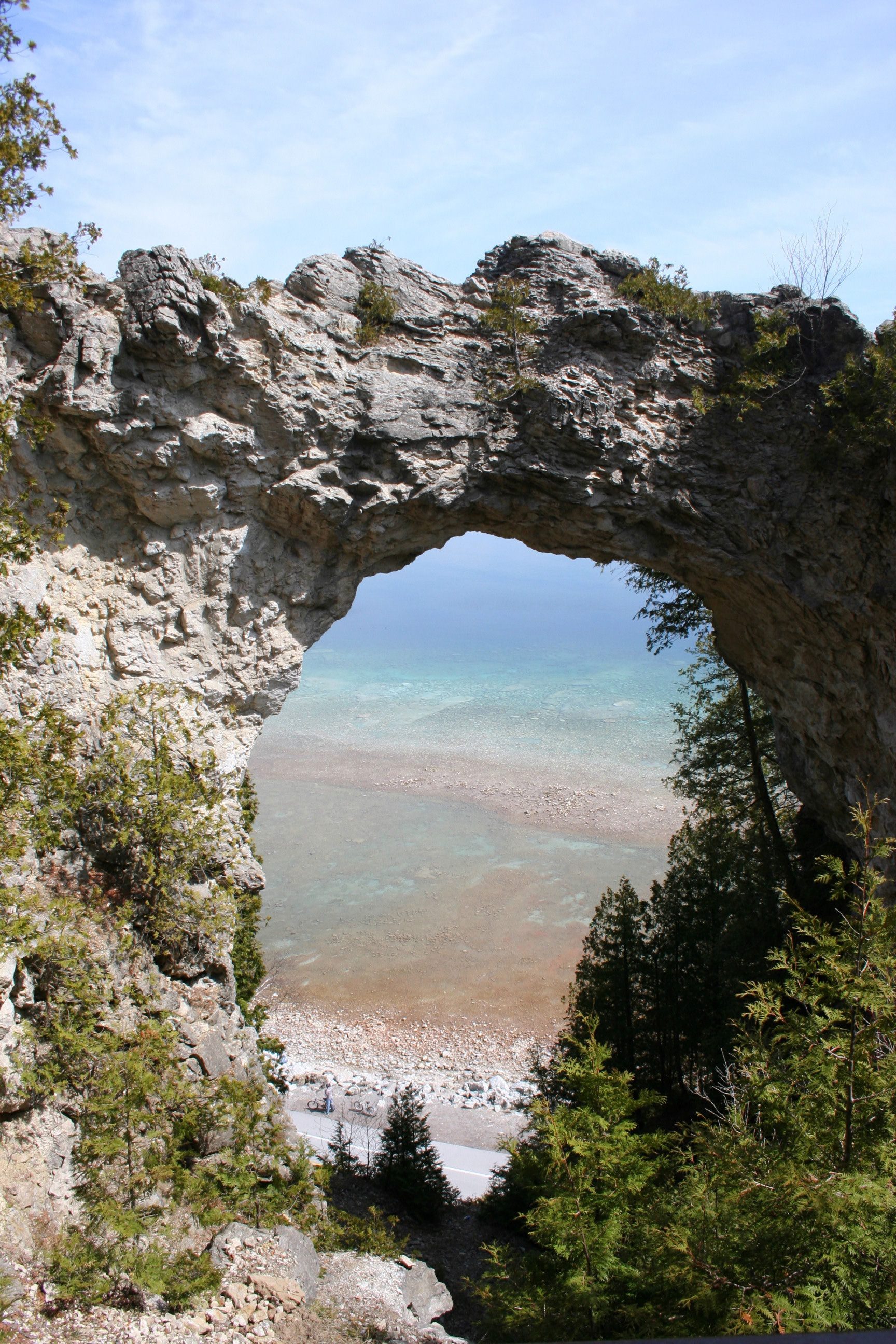
Arch Rock on Mackinac Island

Mackinac National Park was a United States national park that existed from 1875 to 1895 on Mackinac Island in northern Michigan, making it the second U.S. national park after Yellowstone National Park. The 1,044-acre (422 ha) park was created in response to the growing popularity of the island as a summer resort. Its creation was largely the result of efforts by United States Senator Thomas W. Ferry, a native of the island. Senate Bill 28 "to set aside a certain portion of the island of Mackinaw and the straits of Mackinaw, within the State of Michigan as a national park" was introduced December 2, 1874, and signed by President Ulysses S. Grant on March 3, 1875. The national park covered 821 acres (332 ha) while the fort retained 103 acres (42 ha) and the remainder of the island was privately owned.

The park grounds abutted Fort Mackinac, which continued to serve as a United States Army garrison during the operation of the park, as well as island geological features such as Arch Rock and Sugar Loaf. The fort's commander ran the park and federal troops served as park caretakers, as at Yellowstone. The park had the authority to construct roads and trails and to lease small numbers of lots for buildings to offset its expenses, as no federal money was provided to run the park. The park lands also had to be available to the army for military training and in time of war.

In 1895, the fort was decommissioned and, at the request of Michigan Governor John T. Rich, the park and fort was turned over to the state of Michigan, becoming Mackinac Island State Park, the first state park in Michigan. The park was established on the condition that it remain a state park or it would revert to the United States federal government. This restriction caused a problem in the 1960s when the city proposed to lease land from the park for an expanded airport for the island. The lease to the city was ruled a non-park use but the park, on its own, expanded and continues to run the airport.

== See also ==
- Fort Michilimackinac State Park
