= Marquette Park (Mackinac Island) =

Park in Michigan, US

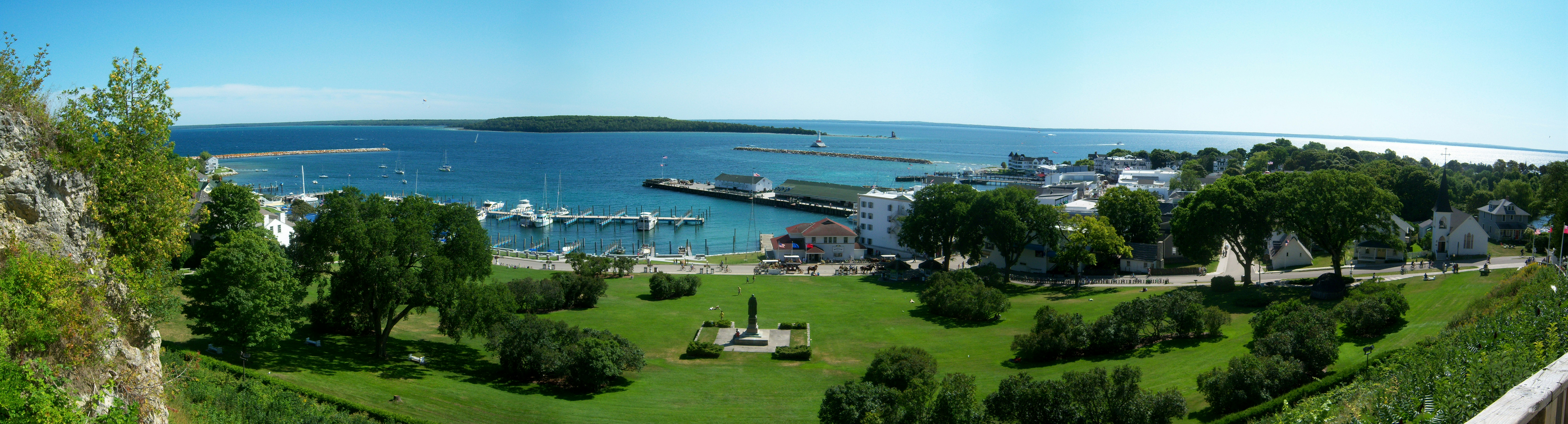
- Panorama of Marquette Park from atop Fort Mackinac

- Location within Michigan Location within the United States
- Location: Mackinac Island State Park; Mackinac Island, Michigan
- Coordinates: 45°51′04″N 84°37′00″W
- Established: 1909
- Governing body: Mackinac State Park Commission
- Marquette Park
- U.S. National Historic Landmark District – Contributing property
- Part of: Mackinac Island (ID66000397)
- Designated NHLDCP: October 15, 1966

Marquette Park is a landscaped park located on Mackinac Island in the U.S. state of Michigan. It is part of Mackinac Island State Park and stands on the edge of Mackinac Island's harbor on the Round Island Channel and just east of downtown Mackinac Island.

== History ==
When Fort Mackinac was built in a commanding location on a bluff above Mackinac Island's harbor in 1780–1781, the relatively flat plateau between the bluff and shoreline was set aside for the Fort's use. During the 1800s, the Fort's men used the area as a vegetable garden, growing potatoes and other foodstuffs there to supplement their rations.

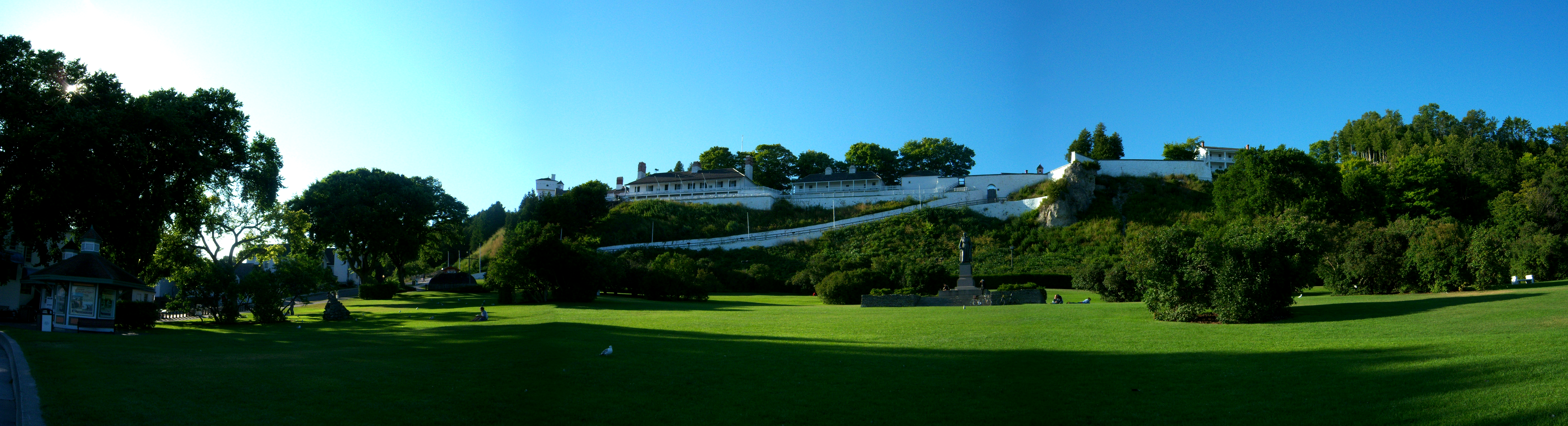
Panorama of Marquette Park from M-185, with Fort Mackinac in the background and the statue of Jacques Marquette in the center

After the U.S. Army ceased to use Fort Mackinac in 1895, the plateau area was redundant. The new Mackinac Island State Park decided to adaptively re-use the former vegetable garden as a quasi-urban park. The newly landscaped park was dedicated to Father Jacques Marquette in 1909.

A major planting of varietal lilacs took place in Marquette Park in 1964, and the State Park also in that year installed a replica chapel intended to evoke memories of a pioneer structure erected at Mackinac Island by Jesuit missionaries, including Marquette, in the 1670s. Today, Marquette Park serves as a visual frame for Fort Mackinac and as the site of mile marker 0 on the circular M-185. The park serves as a popular tourist destination on the island.
