= Thomas White =

Thomas, Tom or Tommy White may refer to:

== Arts and entertainment ==
- Thomas White (sculptor) (1674–1748), British sculptor and architect
- Thomas White (musician) (born 1984), British musician
- Tom White (film), 2004 Australian drama film
- Tommy White, a character in A-Haunting We Will Go

== Military ==
- Thomas White (patriot) (1739–1820), American soldier in General Washington's army
- Thomas D. White (1902–1965), Chief of Staff of the United States Air Force
- Tom Warren White (1902–1993), Australian Army officer
- Thomas E. White (1943–2024), 18th United States Secretary of the Army

== Politics ==
=== Australia ===
- Thomas White (Australian politician) (1888–1957), Australian politician

=== Canada ===
- Andrew Thomas White (died 1900), Ontario MPP
- Thomas White (Canadian politician) (1830–1888), Canadian politician
- William Thomas White (1866–1955), Canadian finance minister during the First World War

=== United Kingdom ===
- Thomas White (MP for Rochester), member of parliament (MP) for Rochester, 1378–1388
- Thomas White (MP for Leominster), MP for Leominster, 1399
- Thomas White (MP for Lewes), MP for Lewes, 1420–1435
- Thomas White (died 1542), MP for Bristol
- Thomas White (died 1558) (1532/4–1558), MP for Downton
- Thomas White (died 1566) (1507–1566), MP for Hampshire
- Thomas White (died 1590), MP for Poole
- Thomas White of Tuxford (died 1580), English state official
- Thomas White (died 1670) (c. 1630–1670), MP for Wells
- Thomas White (1667–1732), MP for East Retford

=== United States ===
- Thomas White (California politician), mayor of San Jose, California from 1851 to 1854
- Thomas White (Michigan politician) (died 1868), Michigan state representative
- Thomas J. White (California politician) (1804–1861), speaker of the California State Assembly
- Thomas W. White (born 1805) (1805–1884), Michigan state representative
- Thomas W. White (Massachusetts politician) (1876–1959), American politician, aide, and campaign manager in Massachusetts
- Thomas W. White (born 1937), Michigan state representative
- Thomas White Jr. (1939–2010), New York politician
- Tom White (Nebraska politician) (born 1956), Nebraska state senator

== Religion ==
- Thomas White (benefactor) (1550–1624), clergyman and founder of Sion College
- Thomas White (scholar) (1593–1676), Catholic philosopher
- Thomas White (bishop) (1628–1698), Bishop of Peterborough (1685–1690)
- Thomas Penny White (1777–1845), English clergyman
- Thomas A. White (1931–2017), Irish Roman Catholic prelate, Apostolic Nuncio (1978–1996)
- Thomas Joseph White (born 1971), American Roman Catholic priest

== Sports ==
=== Association Football ===
- Thomas White (footballer) (Edward Thomas White, 1866-1944), English footballer
- Tommy White (footballer, born 1881) (1881–1953), English footballer for Stockport County
- Tom White (footballer, born 1896) (1896–1960), English football full-back for Birmingham and Newport County
- Tommy White (footballer, born 1908) (1908–1967), Everton and England footballer
- Tom White (footballer, born 1924) (1924–1998), English footballer for Sunderland
- Tom White (footballer, born 1939) (1939–2019), Scottish footballer
- Tom White (footballer, born 1976), English football defender for Bristol Rovers, Hereford United and Yeovil Town
- Tom White (footballer, born 1997), English footballer for Boreham Wood

=== Other sports ===
- Thomas White (cricketer, born c. 1740) (1740–1831), English cricketer for Surrey and Kent
- Thomas White (Sussex cricketer) (1892–1979), English cricketer
- Tom White (rugby) (1885–1943), English rugby union and rugby league footballer who played in the 1900s and 1910s
- Tom White (rugby league, born 1893) (1893–1927), English rugby league footballer who played in the 1910s and 1920s
- Thomas White (speed skater) (1915–1993), Canadian speed skater
- Tom White (runner) (1917–1985), British Olympic athlete
- Tommy White (baseball) (born 2003), American professional baseball third baseman
- Thomas White (baseball) (born 2004), American baseball pitcher
- Tom White (hurler), Irish hurler
- Tom White (American football official), American football official

== Others ==
- Thomas White (merchant) (1492–1567), founder of St. John's College, Oxford
- Thomas White (pirate) (died 1708), English pirate active in the Indian Ocean
- Thomas White (architect) (died 1738), British architect of St Mary and St Margaret's Church, Castle Bromwich
- Thomas White (headteacher) (1758–1825), British mathematician, headteacher and friend of Robert Burns
- Sir Thomas White, 1st Baronet (1767–1817)
- Thomas Willis White (1788–1843), American printer and publisher
- Sir Thomas White, 2nd Baronet (1801–1882)
- Thomas H. White (1836–1914), American businessman; founder of White Sewing Machine Company and co-founder of White Motor Company
- Thomas Raeburn White (1875–1959), American attorney, newspaper publisher, and law professor
- Thomas Bruce White Sr. (1881–1971), American law officer and prison warden
- Thomas P. White (1888–1968), California Supreme Court Justice
- Sir Thomas White, 5th Baronet (1904–1996)
- Thomas Blanco White (1915–2006), British patent lawyer
- Thomas S. White Jr. (born 1943), American asset manager
- Thomas J. White (businessman) (1920–2011), American businessman
- C. Thomas White (1928–2020), American judge in Nebraska

== See also ==
- Thomas Wight (disambiguation)
- Thomas Whyte (disambiguation)
