= Ferry family =

American political family

The Ferrys were a prominent Michigan and Utah family between the early 19th Century to the early 20th Century.

The Ferry Family
| William Montague Ferry | Family Patriarch. A Presbyterian minister, missionary, and community leader who founded several settlements in Ottawa County, Michigan. He became known as the father of Grand Haven and father of Ottawa County. William Montague Ferry |
| William Montague Ferry Jr | William Montague Ferry Jr. Was a Michigan and Utah politician and a Colonel in the Union Army during the American Civil War. |
| Thomas W. Ferry | Senator Thomas W. Ferry Was a U.S. Representative, U.S. Senator, and acting Vice President of the United States from the state of Michigan. He served as president pro tempore of the U.S. Senate. |
| Edward Payson Ferry | Edward Payson Ferry Was as Michigan and Utah businessman. |
| Noah Henry Ferry | Noah Henry Ferry A major for the Union army. He died in the Civil War on July 3, 1863, at the Battle of Gettysburg. His death prompted the Ferry family retrieve his body from Gettysburg. They acquired dune land outside the city closer to Lake Michigan for his grave. This would become the Ferry Family Plot. |
| W. Mont Ferry | W. Mont Ferry Was an American politician. He was a Utah State Senator and the 17th mayor of Salt Lake City |
| Henry Clay Hall | William Montague Ferry's Grandson Henry Clay Hall William Montague Ferry's Grandson, an American attorney and commissioner of the Interstate Commerce Commission, appointed by president Woodrow Wilson in 1914. He served as chairman of the commission from 1917 to 1918 and again in 1924. |
| Ednah Ferry | Was a delegate from Utah to the 1924 Republican National Convention. |
| Zenas Ferry Moody | Governor Zenas Ferry Moody Governor of Oregon. Rev. William Montague Ferry's nephew. |

== See also ==
- Thomas W. White, Michigan Politician who was William Montague Ferry's Brother in-law.
- Brigadier General Dana Merrill, Edward Payson Ferry's son in-law.
- Malcolm A. Moody, U.S. Congressman from Oregon, Zenas Ferry Moody's son.
- William H. Ferry, a member of the New York State Senate. Rev. Ferry's cousin
