= Thomas Wight (disambiguation) =

Thomas Wight was a publisher and draper.

Thomas Wight may also refer to:

- Thomas Wight (architect), partner in Wight and Wight
- Thomas Wight (Bandon) (1640–1724), Quaker
- Thomas Wight (priest), Irish priest in the 1600s

== See also ==
- Thomas White (disambiguation)
- Thomas Whyte (disambiguation)
