= William Montague Ferry Jr. =

American politician

Lieutenant Colonel William Montague Ferry
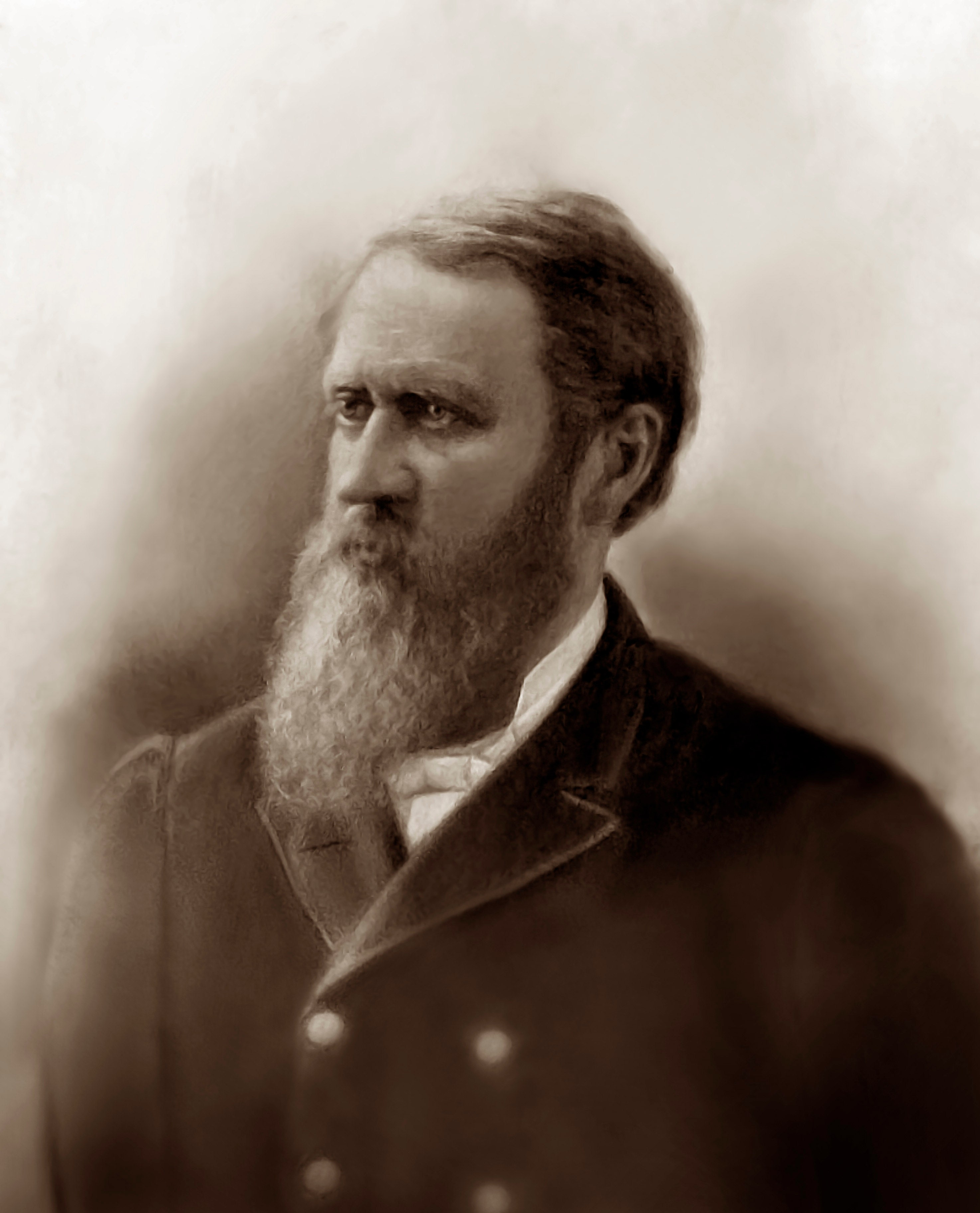
- Born: July 8, 1824; Mackinac Island, Michigan, US
- Died: January 2, 1905 Park City, Utah, US
- Buried: Grand Haven, Michigan, US
- Branch: U.S. Army
- Rank: Lieutenant colonel

William Montague Ferry Jr. (July 8, 1824 – January 2, 1905) was a Michigan and Utah politician, an officer in the Union Army during the American Civil War, and a member of the Ferry family.

== Early life ==
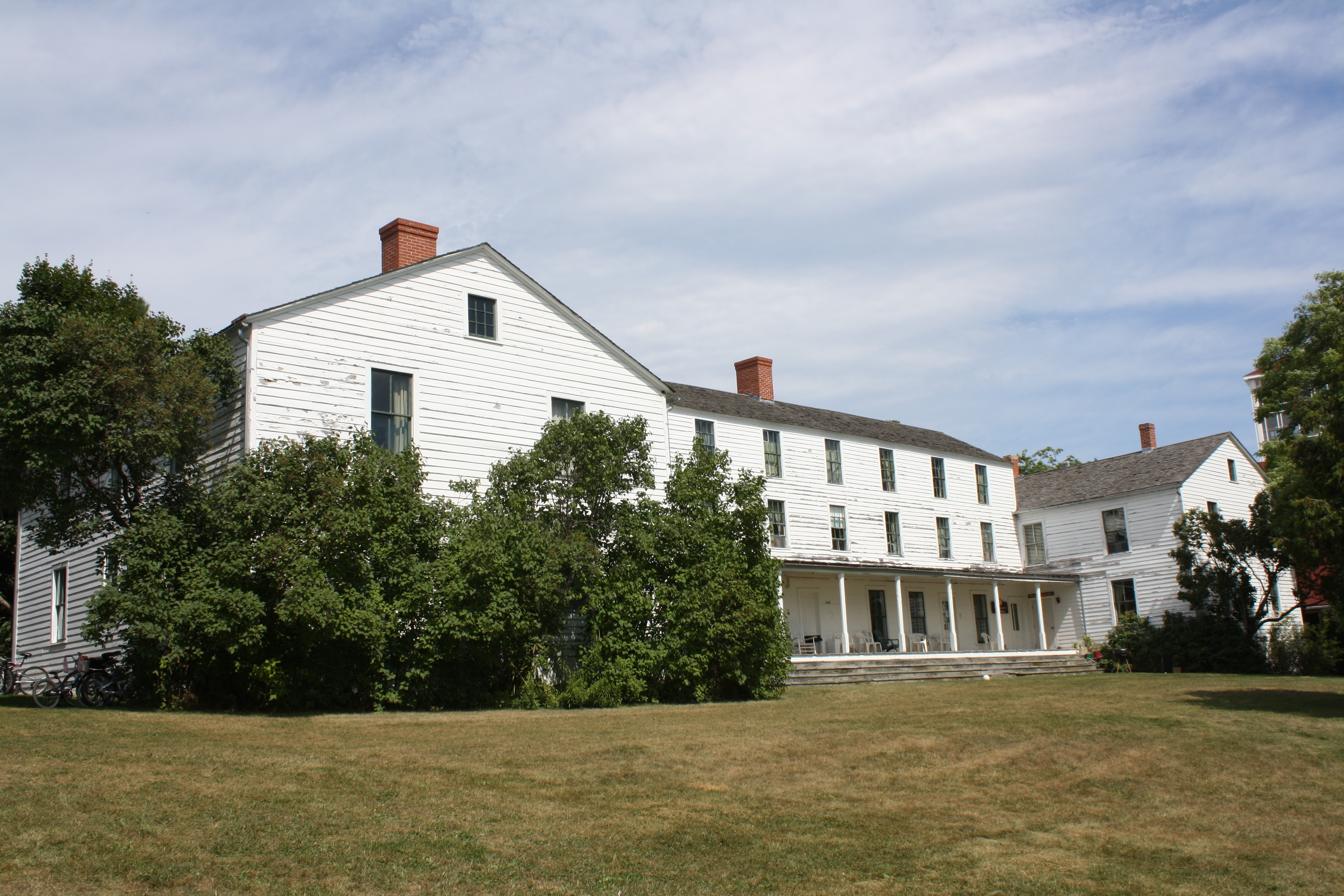
Mission House on Mackinac Island, Ferry's birthplace.

Ferry was born in the Mission House on Mackinac Island, Michigan, as the first son of the Reverend William Montague Ferry and Amanda White Ferry. In the 1830s, the family founded Ferrysburg, Michigan, and in 1834 founded and moved to Grand Haven, Michigan.

== Civil War ==
In August 1861, Ferry joined the 14th Michigan Infantry Regiment, and served during the American Civil War, eventually being made a major and lieutenant colonel in 1865.

During his service, he served alongside General Sherman, who said of Ferry, "You have left your mark in the army, and it will stand to your honor so long as the United States has an army."

William's younger brother, Noah Henry Ferry, served as a Major in the Civil War and died at the Battle of Gettysburg.

== Michigan politics ==
William was Supervisor in Spring Lake in 1849, again from 1854 to 1859, and finally from 1860 to 1861. in 1857 Ferry was elected to the Michigan Legislature.

In 1871, Ferry's brother Thomas W. Ferry—who was a Republican—was elected by the Michigan Legislature as a United States senator for Michigan. As a result, Thomas Ferry vacated his seat in the House of Representatives for Michigan's 4th congressional district, and William ran as the Democratic Party nominee in a special election for the seat. William Ferry lost the election to Republican Wilder D. Foster by a 58%–42% margin.

In the 1872 election, Ferry was the nominee of the Democratic Party for governor of Michigan. He received only 1.2% of the vote, losing badly to Republican John J. Bagley (61.9%), and also trailing Liberal Republican and former governor Austin Blair (36.3%). The following year, Bagley appointed Ferry as a committee member charged with revising the constitution of Michigan.

Ferry served as a Regent of the University of Michigan from 1858 to 1863.

In 1876, Ferry was elected mayor of Grand Haven.

== Utah politics ==
In 1878, Ferry moved to Park City, Utah, and become involved in the mining industry. From 1884 to 1892 he was a member of the Democratic National Committee. In 1893, he was a Commissioner of the Chicago World's Fair.

In 1904, Ferry joined Utah's new anti-Mormon American Party. Ferry was the party's nominee for governor of Utah in the 1904 election. In losing to Republican John Christopher Cutler, Ferry received nearly 8,000 votes, or 7.8% of the statewide total.

== Business dealings ==
Ferry was a successful businessman. He began working for his father's lumber businesses. He then expanded into iron, owning Ottawa Iron Works. His company owned fleets of lake freighters for lumber and iron. He also held various patents related to iron, which proved to be very successful. Once the Michigan lumber markets began to dry in the 1870s, Ferry moved to Utah and became one of the largest mining magnates in the United States. The first mines Col. Ferry owned were the Mayflower Mine, the Walker Mine, and the Webster Mine. After a few years in Utah, Col. Ferry and his brother Edward Payson Ferry had ownership interests in nearly all of Park City's silver mines. They also owned silver mines in Nevada, Arizona, and even in Peru.

Col. Ferry's Park City (known as the Ferry-Kearns mansion) is a large Victorian mansion. The home is still in Park City, but has been moved from its original location.

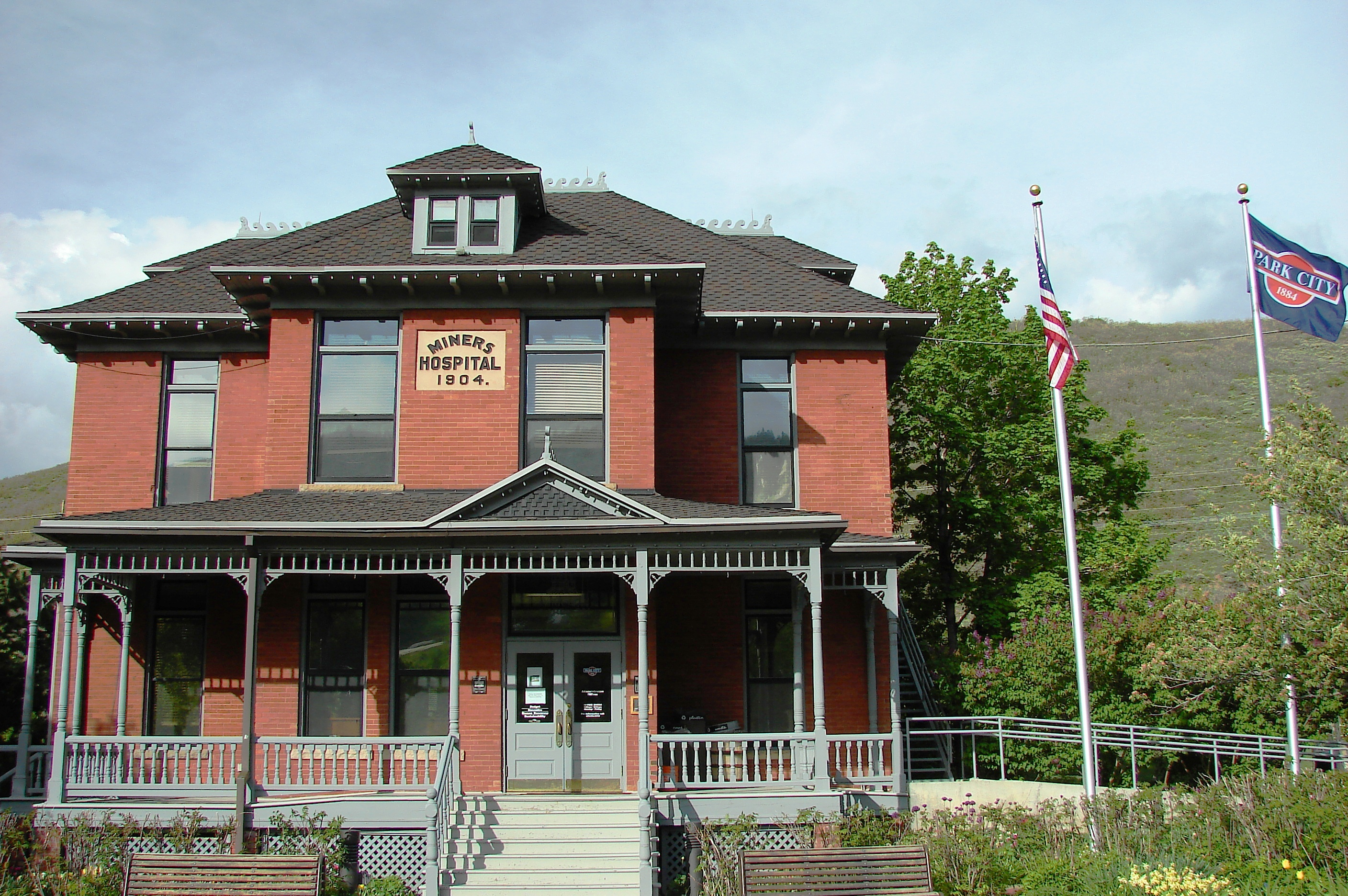
Miner's Hospital in Park City

Many of the Utah mining magnates were not known for their philanthropic efforts. Col. Ferry though was known as much for his philanthropic work as his mining success. Ferry was one of the major donors to Park City's First Hospital (known as Miner's Hospital), and he was the featured speaker at its opening.

Ferry donated land for the campus of Westminster College, and funded the school's largest building (Ferry Hall), which was demolished in 1987. Stones from Ferry Hall were reused for the current Ferry Plaza.

== Death ==
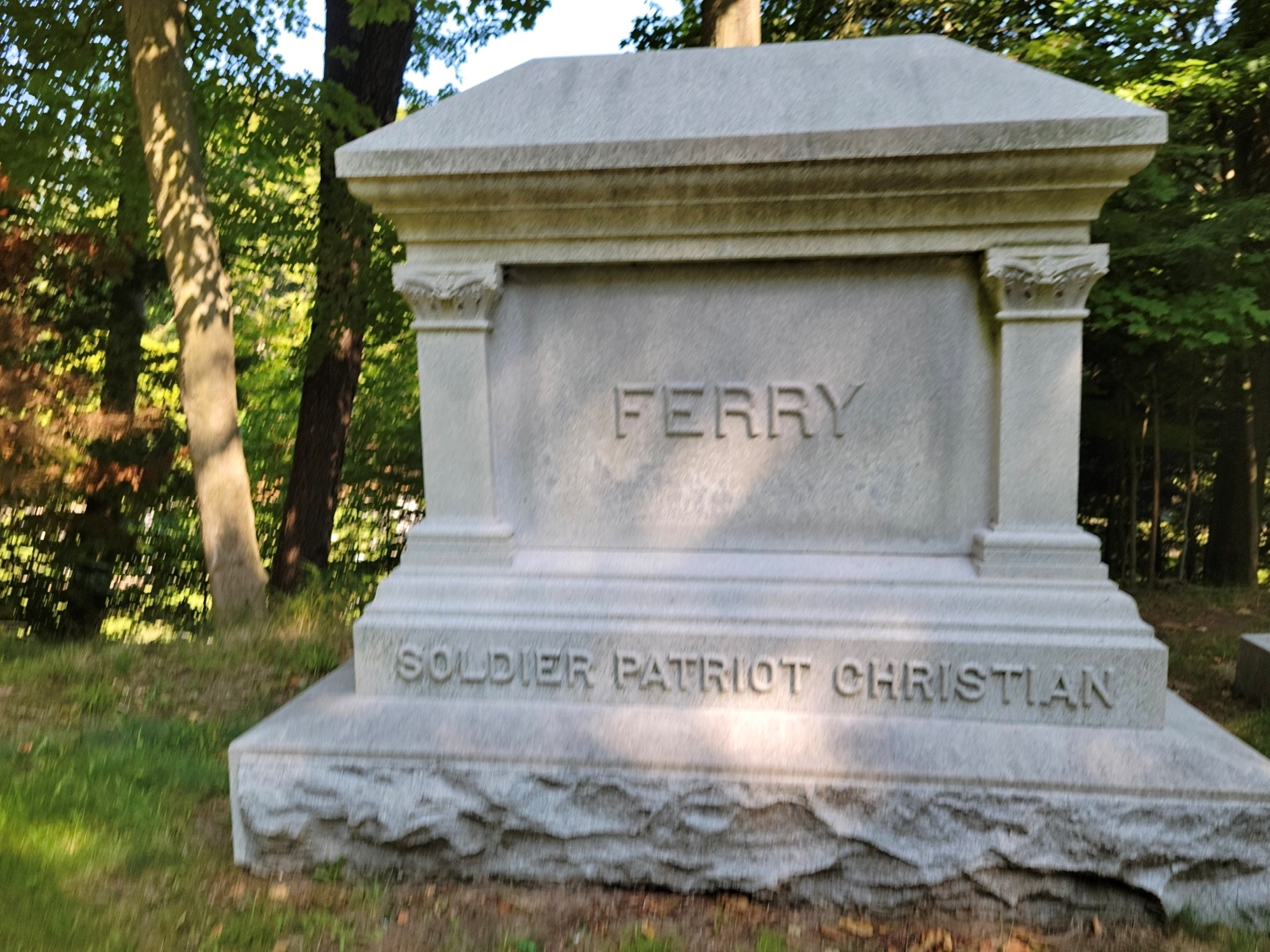
Monument at Ferry plot where William is buried.

In Ferry's old age, he was nearly blind and severely asthmatic. He died in Park City on January 2, 1905. His funeral was remembered as the highest attended event in the history of the City. After his funeral, his body was shipped to his home town of Grand Haven, Michigan where he is interred in the Ferry Family plot

== Family ==
Ferry married Jeanette Hollister on October 29, 1851. The couple had six children. One of his nephews, W. Mont Ferry, was mayor of Salt Lake City from 1916 to 1919.

Party political offices
Preceded by Charles C. Comstock	Democratic nominee for Governor of Michigan; 1872	Succeeded by Henry Chamberlain
