= General Merrill =

General Merrill may refer to:

- Dana T. Merrill (1876–1957), U.S. Army brigadier general
- Frank Merrill (1903–1955), U.S. Army brigadier general
- Lewis Merrill (1834–1896), Union Army brevet brigadier general
