= Dana T. Merrill =

United States Army general

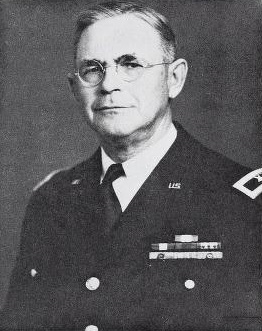
- From 1984's A History of Fort Benjamin Harrison, 1903–1982
- Born: October 15, 1876; East Auburn, Maine
- Died: August 3, 1957 (aged 80); Fort Thomas, Kentucky
- Burial place: Mount Auburn Cemetery, Auburn, Maine
- Relatives: Elmer Drew Merrill (brother)
- Military career
- Allegiance: United States of America
- Branch: United States Army
- Service years: 1898–1940
- Rank: Brigadier General
- Unit: United States Army Infantry branch
- Commands: 10th Infantry Regiment; Fort Thomas, Kentucky; Sixth Corps Area; Second United States Army (Acting); 12th Infantry Brigade; Fort Sheridan, Illinois; Washington Provisional Brigade; Fort Benjamin Harrison, Indiana; 10th Infantry Brigade; Indiana Civilian Conservation Corps District; Fifth Corps Area
- Conflicts: Spanish–American War; Philippine–American War; World War I
- Awards: Army Distinguished Service Medal; Croix de Guerre (Belgium); Croix de Guerre (France); Legion of Honor (France); Officer of the Order of Leopold (Belgium)
- Other work: Civil Defense Coordinator, greater Cincinnati area

Dana T. Merrill (October 15, 1876 – August 3, 1957) was a career officer in the United States Army. A veteran of the Spanish–American War and World War I, Merrill attained the rank of brigadier general, and was most notable as the World War I chief of staff for the 37th Division, and the commander of the 10th Infantry Regiment, three infantry brigades, and two corps areas.

A native of East Auburn, Maine, Merrill graduated from the University of Maine in 1898 and enlisted in a Maine volunteer unit during the Spanish–American War. Later that year, he was commissioned as a second lieutenant, and he served in the Philippines during the Philippine–American War. Merrill continued to work his way up the ranks during the period prior to World War I, and graduated from the Army School of the Line and the Command and General Staff College.

During World War I, Merrill was chief of staff for the 37th Division. He took part in numerous engagements and battles in France, and received several US and foreign decorations. He remained in the Army after the war, and graduated from the Army War College in 1920. He commanded the 10th Infantry Regiment from 1924 to 1927, and in the 1930s, his command assignments included the 10th Infantry Brigade, 12th Infantry Brigade, Washington Provisional Brigade, Sixth Corps Area, and Fifth Corps Area. Merrill retired from the Army upon reaching the mandatory retirement age of 64 in 1940.

During World War II, Merrill was the Civil Defense coordinator for the greater Cincinnati area, including southern Ohio and northern Kentucky. He died at his home in Fort Thomas, Kentucky, on August 3, 1957, and was buried at Mount Auburn Cemetery in Auburn, Maine.

== Early life ==
Dana True Merrill was born in East Auburn, Maine, on October 15, 1876, the son of Daniel Cummings Merrill and Mary Adelaide (Noyes) Merrill. His siblings included Elmer Drew Merrill, who was his twin. Merrill was educated in East Auburn, and graduated from the University of Maine with a Bachelor of Science degree in 1898. In 1901, the Sigma Alpha Epsilon fraternity founded a chapter at the University of Maine, and Merrill was initiated as a charter member. Among Merrill's college classmates was Alfred A. Starbird, a career army officer who attained the rank of brigadier general.

== Start of career ==
In May 1898, Merrill enlisted for the Spanish–American War as a member of Company H, 1st Maine Volunteer Infantry Regiment. In September 1898, he received a regular Army commission as a second lieutenant of Infantry, and his initial assignments included command of Company A, 12th Infantry Regiment during combat in the Philippine–American War. In 1908, Merrill graduated from the Army School of the Line, and he was a 1909 graduate of the Command and General Staff College.

== Continued career ==
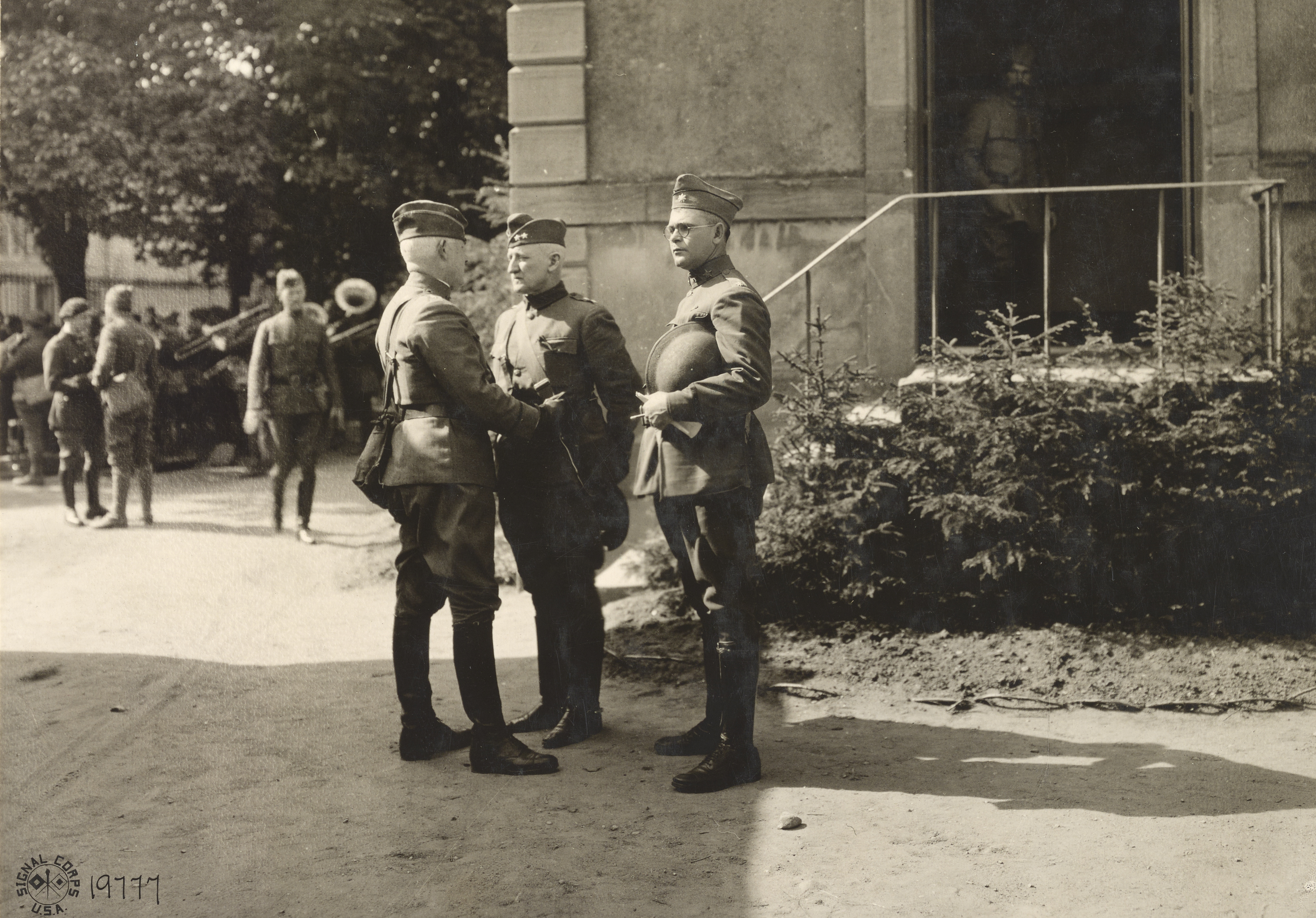
Major General George B. Duncan (left), commanding the 77th Division, in conversation with the commander of the 37th Division, Major General Charles S. Farnsworth (center) at Baccarat, France, July 24, 1918. Colonel Hennay, the 77th's chief of staff, and Lieutenant Colonel Dana T. Merrill, the 37th's chief of staff, can be seen in the background.

Merrill continued his Army career after the war, and served with the 7th, 23rd, 28th, 10th, and 3rd Infantry Regiments. He was promoted to first lieutenant in 1899, captain in 1905, major in May 1917, lieutenant colonel (National Army) in August 1917, and colonel (National Army) in July 1918.

During World War I, Merrill served in France as chief of staff of the 37th Division. In 1920, Merrill reverted to his permanent rank of lieutenant colonel, and he was promoted to colonel later that year. He graduated from the Army War College in 1920.

From 1924 to 1927 was commander of the 10th Infantry Regiment and Fort Thomas, Kentucky.

== Later career ==
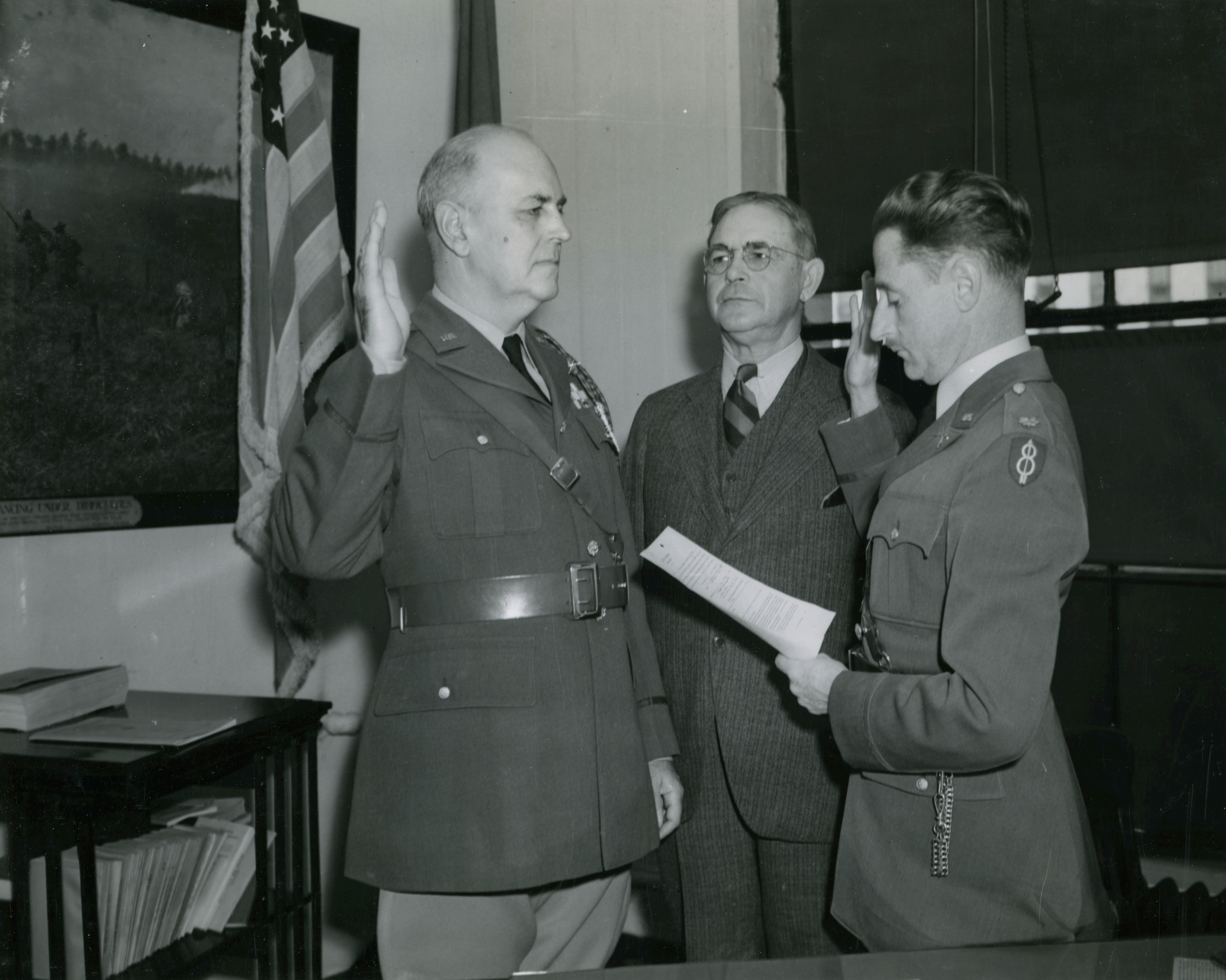
Maxwell Murray (left) is sworn in as a Brigadier General on 1 December 1938 by Major Horace B. Smith (right) while Merrill (center) looks on.

In 1933, Merrill was appointed to command the 10th Infantry Brigade, a unit of the 5th Infantry Division at Fort Benjamin Harrison, Indiana. From 1933 to 1935, he again commanded the 10th Infantry Regiment and Fort Thomas. In 1935, he was promoted to brigadier general, and from 1935 to 1937, Merrill was commander of Fort Sheridan, Illinois, and the 12th Infantry Brigade, a unit of the 6th Infantry Division. From May to September 1936, he was acting commander of the Sixth Corps Area and the Second United States Army.

From 1937 to 1938, he commanded the Washington Provisional Brigade, a unit based in Washington, D.C. In 1938, Merrill was named to command of Fort Benjamin Harrison, Indiana, the 10th Infantry Brigade, and the Indiana Civilian Conservation Corps District, In 1939, he was assigned to command the Fifth Corps Area at Fort Benjamin Harrison. Merrill retired from the Army in 1940.

== World War II ==
During World War II, Merrill was the Civil Defense Coordinator for the greater Cincinnati area.

== Awards and decorations ==
Merrill's awards included the Army Distinguished Service Medal, the Croix de Guerre from Belgium, and the Croix de Guerre and Legion of Honor (Officer) from France. In addition, he was appointed an officer of Belgium's Order of Leopold.

== Death and burial ==
Merrill died in Fort Thomas, Kentucky, on August 3, 1957. He was buried at Mount Auburn Cemetery in Auburn, Maine.

== Family ==
In 1903, Merrill and Edith Ferry (1880–1953) were married in Grand Haven, Michigan. She was the daughter of Edward Payson Ferry and Clara V. (White) Ferry. Senator Thomas W. Ferry was her uncle and W. Mont Ferry was her brother. William Montague Ferry was her grandfather.

The children of Dana Merrill and Edith Ferry Merrill included sons Harwood F. and Dana Noyes, and daughter Virginia True.

== Sources ==
=== Books ===
- Year Book, American Philosophical Society. Philadelphia, PA: American Philosophical Society. 1957.
- Who Was Who in American History: The Military. Chicago, IL: Marquis Who's Who, Inc. 1975. ISBN 9780837932019.
- Bower, Stephen E. (1984). A History of Fort Benjamin Harrison, 1903–1982. Fort Benjamin Harrison: Command History Office.
- Clay, Steven E. (2010). U.S. Army Order of Battle, 1919–1941 (PDF). Vol. 1. Ft. Leavenworth, KS: Combat Studies Institute Press.
- Davis, Henry Blaine Jr. (1998). Generals In Khaki. Raleigh, North Carolina: Pentland Press. ISBN 978-1-5719-7088-6 – via Google Books.
- Gore, James Howard (1919). American Legionnaires of France. Washington, DC: W. F. Roberts Co.
- Nash, Howard P.; Virgin, Edward H.; Levere, William Collin (1904). The Sixth General Catalogue of Sigma Alpha Epsilon. Evanston, IL: Sigma Alpha Epsilon Fraternity. p. 173.
- U.S. Army Adjutant General (1920). U.S. Army Register (1920). Washington, DC: U.S. Government Printing Office.
- U.S. Army Adjutant General (1945). U.S. Army Register (1945). Washington, DC: U.S. Government Printing Office – via Ancestry.com.
- Sketches of the Inter-Mountain States. Salt Lake City, UT: The Salt Lake Tribune. 1909 – via Google Books.

=== Newspapers ===
- "University's Volunteers". Bangor Daily Commercial. Bangor, Maine. 7 May 1898 – via Newspapers.com.
- "Higher Rank in View for Soldier". The Cincinnati Enquirer. Cincinnati, OH. January 11, 1935 – via Newspapers.com.
- "Merrill to take Place of Naylor". The Indianapolis Star. Indianapolis, IN. November 1, 1938 – via Newspapers.com.
- "Gen. Dana T. Merrill Dies". The Cincinnati Enquirer. Cincinnati, OH. August 4, 1957 – via Newspapers.com.

== Internet ==
- "Faylene Hutton Cemetery Collection, 1780-1990, Entry for Dana True Merrill". Ancestry.com. Lehi, UT: Ancestry.com LLC.
