= Winthrop More Daniels =

American bureaucrat and academic (1867–1944)

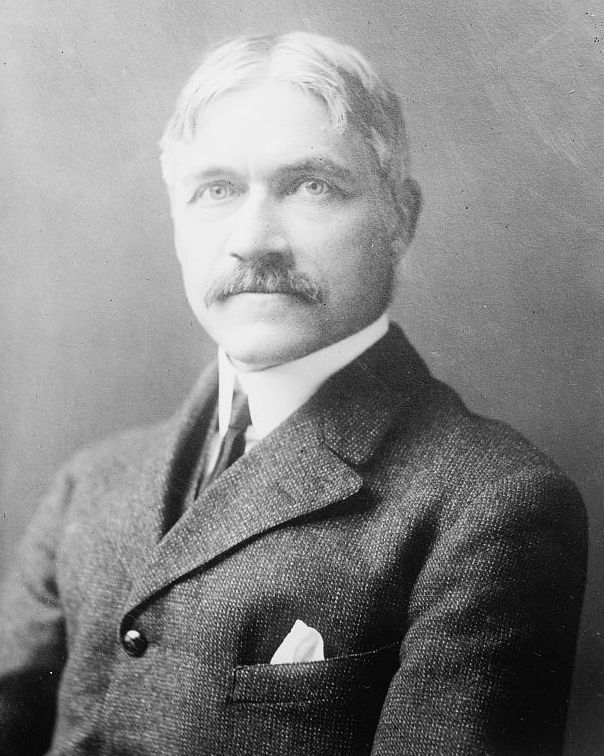
- Daniels, c. 1914
- Born: September 30, 1867; Dayton, Ohio
- Died: January 3, 1944 (aged 76); Saybrook Point, Connecticut
- Known for: Interstate Commerce Commission commissioner

Winthrop More Daniels (September 30, 1867 – January 3, 1944) was an American government official and university professor. A friend and onetime assistant of then-Professor Woodrow Wilson, President Wilson appointed Daniels, then a member of the New Jersey Board of Public Utilities to the Interstate Commerce Commission in 1914, and stood by him through a bitter confirmation battle in the Senate. He was a longtime professor at Princeton University, where he was an assistant to Wilson before becoming a fellow professor, and at Yale University.

== Early life ==
He was born in Dayton, Ohio, the son of Mary and Edwin Daniels. He attended Princeton University where he secured his bachelor's degree in 1888 and his master's degree two years later. He studied at the University of Leipzig in 1890, and taught for a year as an instructor at Wesleyan University from 1891–92.

== New Jersey ==
In 1892, Daniels was appointed as assistant professor of political economy, and three years later became a full professor, a post he kept until he entered government service in 1911. He married Joan Robertson in 1898; the two had a son, Robertson Balfour Daniels. A friend of Wilson's, Daniels joined with Wilson in training the Princeton debaters for their championship matches against Harvard University and Yale University.

On May 1, 1911, Daniels became a member of the New Jersey Board of Public Utilities, replacing Frank H. Sommer of Newark, New Jersey. While on the Commission, Daniels authored a rate case opinion involving the Passaic Gas Company, in which he added intangible value for goodwill to the physical value of the corporation. This was controversial, since regulated companies' rates were a percentage of their valuation.

== Interstate Commerce Commission ==
On November 21, 1913, Interstate Commerce Commissioner John Hobart Marble died after an attack of acute indigestion. The death of Marble, who had been appointed to fulfill the unexpired term of Franklin Knight Lane after Lane was appointed Interior Secretary, together with the resignation of Charles A. Prouty left Wilson with two seats to fill. He chose Daniels and Henry Clay Hall.

While Hall had no difficulty being confirmed, because of the Passaic rate case, Daniels' nomination was bitterly opposed by progressives in the Senate led by Robert M. La Follette, Sr. and New Jersey Senator James Edgar Martine. Wilson refused to withdraw the nominations, stating that he would be personally responsible for Daniels' success as an ICC member. After a three-day battle, the Senate confirmed Daniels, with La Follette himself voting for confirmation. Daniels' confirmation, by a vote of 36 to 27 on April 3, 1914, came after some Democrats who had been inclined to oppose Daniels voted in favor rather than offend President Wilson by rejecting a personal friend of the President. The nomination had been believed to be in serious danger, with the Democrats "in despair" fearing a rejection by the Senate.

Wilson's renomination of Daniels in December 1916 set off a second bruising fight in the Senate, with the progressive wing of the Republican party opposing the nomination due to their belief that Daniels was a reactionary. Nonetheless, Daniels was reconfirmed for a full seven-year term on January 10, 1917, by a vote of 42 to 15.

== Later life ==
In early 1923, nearly a year before the scheduled end of his term, Daniels resigned. He became a professor of transportation at Yale University, where he served until 1940 when he retired.

He died January 3, 1944, in Saybrook Point, Connecticut.
