= William Montague Ferry =

American missionary

Reverend William Montague Ferry
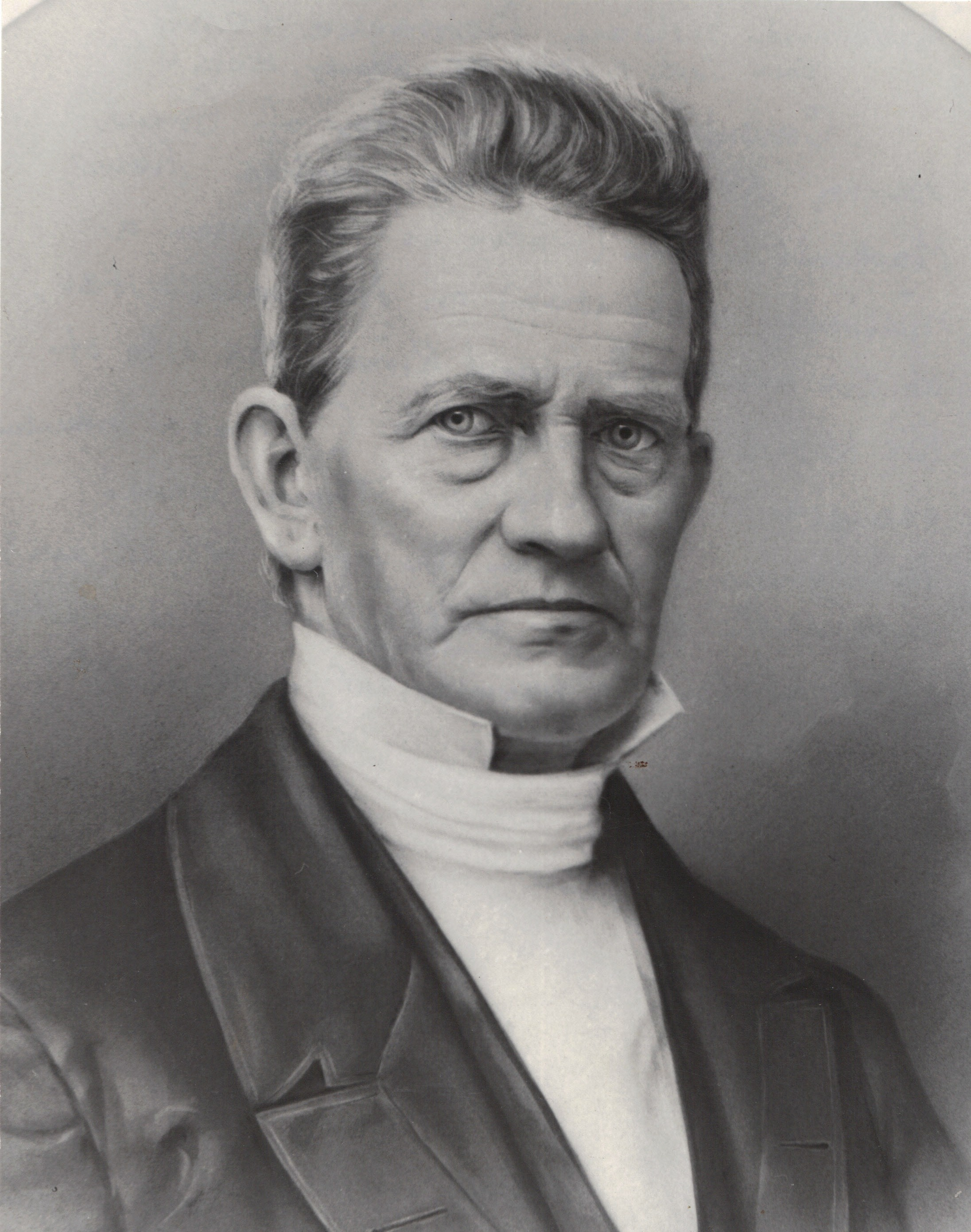
- Ferry in 1837
- Born: September 8, 1796; Granby, Massachusetts, U.S.
- Died: December 30, 1867 (aged 71); Grand Haven, Michigan, U.S.
- Resting place: Lake Forest Cemetery, Grand Haven
- Education: Union College & New Brunswick Theological Seminary
- Spouse: Amanda White Ferry
- Children: William Montague Ferry Jr., Thomas White Ferry, Amanda H Ferry, Noah Henry Ferry, Hannah E Ferry, Mary L Ferry, Edward Payson Ferry

William Montague Ferry Sr. (September 8, 1796 – December 30, 1867) was a Presbyterian minister, missionary, and community leader who founded several settlements in Ottawa County, Michigan. He became known as the father of Grand Haven and father of Ottawa County.

== Early life ==
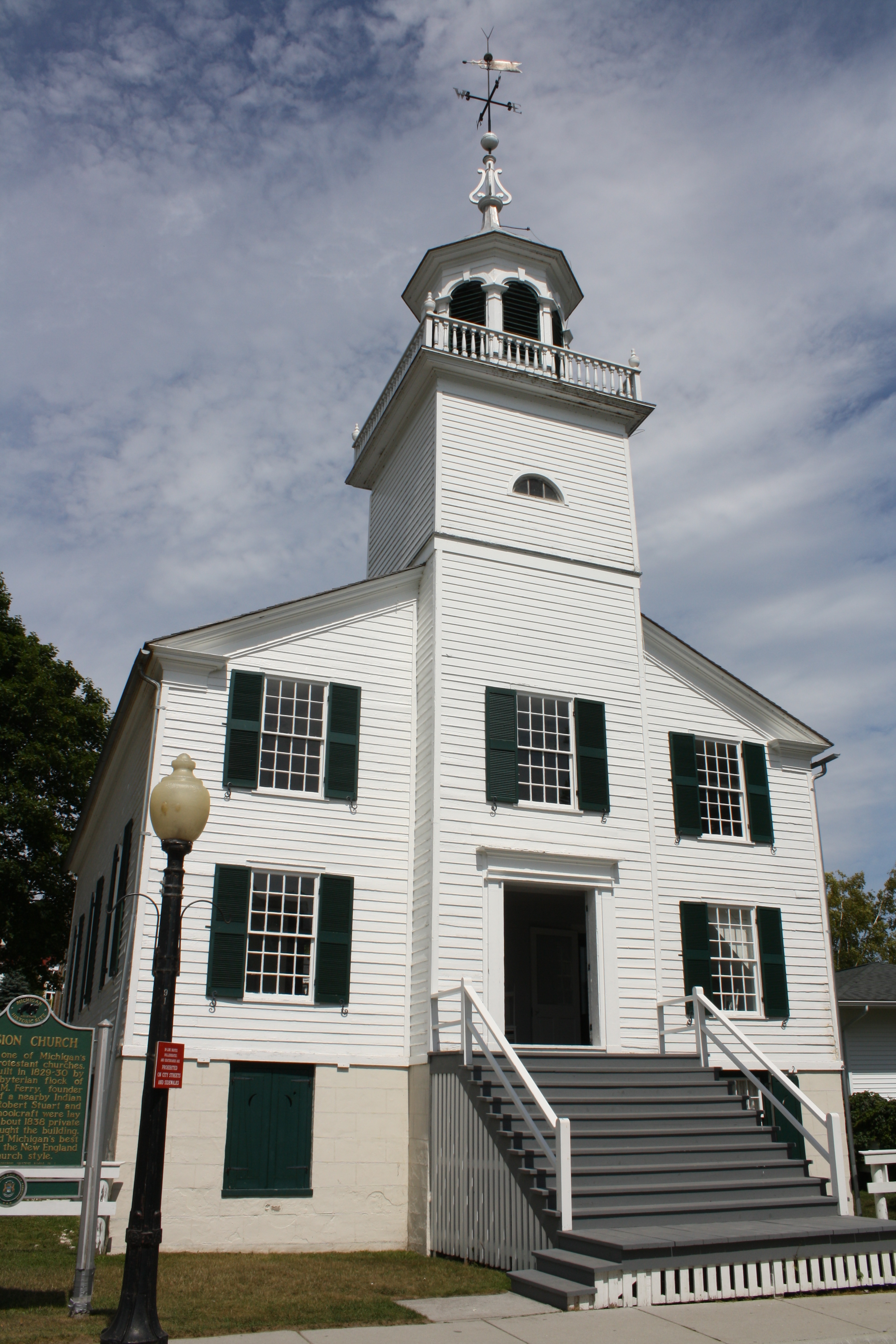
Mission Church on Mackinac Island. This is where Ferry preached.

Ferry was born in Granby, Massachusetts to Noah Henry Ferry and Hannah Montague Ferry. Rather than pursuing farming like his father, Ferry chose a professional career. Graduating at age 24 in 1821 from Union College at Schenectady, New York, he attended New Brunswick Seminary and received his ordination by the New York Presbytery in 1822.

In the 1820s, Ferry established a Christian mission of Ojibwe natives on Mackinac Island. The Mission House he built there in 1825 is listed on the National Register of Historic Places and is operated as part of the Mackinac Island State Park.

Ferry developed a flair for enterprise while serving at the mission post. While serving as a missionary, he contracted to have a schooner built to carry materials and provisions. The schooner was named Supply. This ship made trips to Buffalo, Cleveland, Detroit, Chicago and Grand Haven. The ship made a profit and the profit went to the operation of the mission. The Massachusetts Mission Board determined that this enterprise thinking was in conflict with the purposes and goals of the Mackinac Mission. He was forced to sell the ship.

== Bi-vocational Presbyterian minister ==
Ferry made an impression on the explorer Robert Stuart, who worked with the American Fur Company's Northern Department based on Mackinac Island. Stuart saw the enterprising young Ferry as a perfect prospect for someone to run his affairs in Michigan's budding lumber industry. Ferry surveyed places to develop a lumber foothold. Ferry proposed to Stuart that the Grand River Valley held great possibility. By June 1834, Stuart placed funds in the hands of Ferry to settle on the Grand River to set up a land and lumber enterprise while sharing the profits.

On October 31, 1834, Ferry and his family arrived on the banks of the Grand River. The ship Supply was chartered to bring them to Grand Haven from Mackinac Island. Within a year, they were living in a log cabin near the Grand River in a new settlement named Grand Haven.

Ferry, an ordained minister in the Presbyterian church, started a new church within days of arriving. He preached his first sermon on November 2, 1834, at the log cabin house and fur trading post of Rix Robinson, who became his friend and business partner. Ferry began this house church with 21 people, including his family. On March 11, 1835, Ferry moved the religious services to his partly completed log cabin on the southwest corner of Washington and Water. Near his house, for a cost of $650, Ferry owned and built the first framed building in Grand Haven in 1836 that served as a school and a church. Together with Robinson and Stuart, he founded the Grand Haven Company, which was engaged in the lumbering business. Soon, factories were built on the area and produced products ranging from farm machinery to pianos.

Ferry communicated with other key bi-vocational ministers in West Michigan like Rev. A. C van Raalte, founder of Holland, Michigan. Van Raalte led a group of Dutch Christians looking for religious liberty in America. In 1847, Ferry and van Raalte met. Ferry encourage van Raalte to settle in the Holland area.

Ferry lived in Grand Haven involved with the Presbyterian church from 1834 until his death. In 1869, Ferry Hall School in Lake Forest, Illinois, was established as a result of a bequest made in Ferry's will.

== Grand Haven enterprise legacy ==
Ferry capitalized on the timber opportunity in the Grand Haven area. He formed the Grand Haven Company, which dealt with acquiring and profiting from timberland. Ferry and his brother-in-law Nathan White started the Ferry and White Company, the first mercantile business in the Grand Haven area. By the 1850s, Ferry included his sons in his business ventures. He and his sons founded a bank called Ferry and Sons. They plotted Ferrysburg in 1857 and formed Ferry and Sons Shipyard. When Ferry died on December 30, 1867, he was considered the "father of Grand Haven". All business shut down on January 2, 1868, from 12 p.m. to 5 p.m. to allow the people of the community to attend his funeral. His estate was valued at $410,000. He gave to many Christian causes for the spread of the gospel and education. Over $270,000 remained with his wife and their children. His wife died three years to the day on December 30, 1870. The valued estate transferred to their children, with their youngest son, Edward Payson Ferry, the executor.

Despite his estate valuation being listed at $410,000 ($8,900,000 in 2025 dollars) this did not reflect all his holdings. Heirs later sued his estate, and in 1909 an additional $1,000,000 ($35,000,000 in 2025 dollars) was ordered to be split among heirs.

== Ferry family ==
Twenty-six year old Ferry married twenty-two year old Amanda White of Ashfield, Massachusetts, on July 8, 1823. On September 15, 1823, the newly married couple made their way to the Mackinac Native American mission. They traveled in the partially completed Erie Canal. They arrived at Mackinac on October 19, 1823. They moved to Grand Haven in 1834 and lived there until their deaths. William is known as the patriarch of the Ferry family.

Ferry and his wife Amanda had seven children:

1. William Montague Ferry Jr., born on their first anniversary on July 8, 1824, on Mackinac Island and died 1905. William Montague Ferry, Jr., was an officer in the Union army, and a politician in Michigan and Utah. He was affiliated with the Democratic Party.
2. Thomas White Ferry, born on June 1, 1836, and died in 1897. He became a member of the United States House of Representatives and the United States Senate for Michigan as a Republican. Thomas lived in Grand Haven at a mansion he built at Columbus and Second Street. After William and Amanda Ferry's log cabin burned down in 1866, they went to live with Thomas until their deaths.
3. Amanda Harwood Ferry, born on September 20, 1828, and died in 1917. When she was two years old, she was sent back to Ashfield, Massachusetts, with her aunt Hannah White. She was raised by her grandparents in Ashfield. When her grandparents died in 1847, she rejoined her parents in Grand Haven, but returned to Ashfield to marry Henry Clay Hall, Sr. in 1855 at the age of 26. Their first born son, Henry Clay Hall Jr., was notable. He was an attorney and commissioner of the Interstate Commerce Commission, appointed by president Woodrow Wilson in 1914. He served on the commission from March 21, 1914, to January 13, 1928. He served as chairman of the commission from 1917 to 1918 and again in 1924. In 1913, he participated in a U.S. Supreme Court case against his cousin Edward S. Ferry.
4. Noah Henry Ferry, born on April 30, 1831. He became a major for the Union army. He died in the Civil War on July 3, 1863, at the Battle of Gettysburg. His death prompted the Ferry family to retrieve his body from Gettysburg. They acquired dune land outside the city near Lake Michigan for his grave. This would become the Ferry Family Plot. This action set in motion the eventual development of Lake Forest Cemetery in Grand Haven.
5. Hannah Elizabeth Ferry, born on April 16, 1834, and died in 1913. She was the last of their children born on Mackinac Island. She was also raised by her grandparents in Ashfield, Massachusetts, until she was thirteen when she moved to Grand Haven to live with her parents. She attended Rockford Seminary in the 1850s.
6. Mary Lucinda Ferry (1837–1903) became a teacher in the second school in Grand Haven located on First Street. She married Galen Eastman, the son of Timothy Eastman, who was the founder of Eastmanville, Michigan, and who was the first Ottawa County clerk in 1838 and a county judge in 1847. Mary had a daughter named Mary Amanda Eastman on March 9, 1860. Her husband, Galen, was appointed Agent for the Bureau of Indian Affairs. Their family moved from Grand Haven to the Navajo Reservation near the Four Corners where New Mexico, Colorado, Arizona, and Utah meet. She died in San Francisco on June 2, 1903.
7. Edward Payson Ferry (1837–1917) lived his early childhood in Grand Haven. Edward worked with his father in the various Ferry businesses. When his father died on December 30, 1867, Edward was the executor of the Ferry's estate and was given a wide range of responsibilities. Shortly afterward, Edward invested resources in mining opportunities in Utah. At first, his mines failed. Various heirs backed the venture to make good on all liabilities against the estate. Edward himself moved to Utah to manage the investments. In Utah, Edward proved to be very effective in buying and developing premium mining properties. Using Ferry Estate capital to recoup his earlier losses, he turned everything around to amass a large fortune. These developments would later create a conflict that would be taken to the Supreme Court, which would set precedent for case law concerning using estate funds. Edward Payson Ferry married Clara Virginia White, a second cousin who worked as a teacher. They had two sons in the early 1870s of note. Their first son was William Montague Ferry, born on March 12, 1871, named after his grandfather, who had recently passed. This son later became president of the Utah State Senate from 1911 to 1915 and Mayor of Salt Lake City from 1915 to 1919. His second son, Edward Steward Ferry, was born in 1872 in Grand Haven. He was an 1896 graduate of University of Michigan Law School. He became a prominent Salt Lake City attorney with influential political connections. Edward Steward Ferry participated in a US Supreme court case against his cousin, Henry Clay Hall Jr., in April 1913. His side lost the case. He committed suicide on June 11, 1913. His body was brought back to Grand Haven, Michigan to be buried in the family plot.
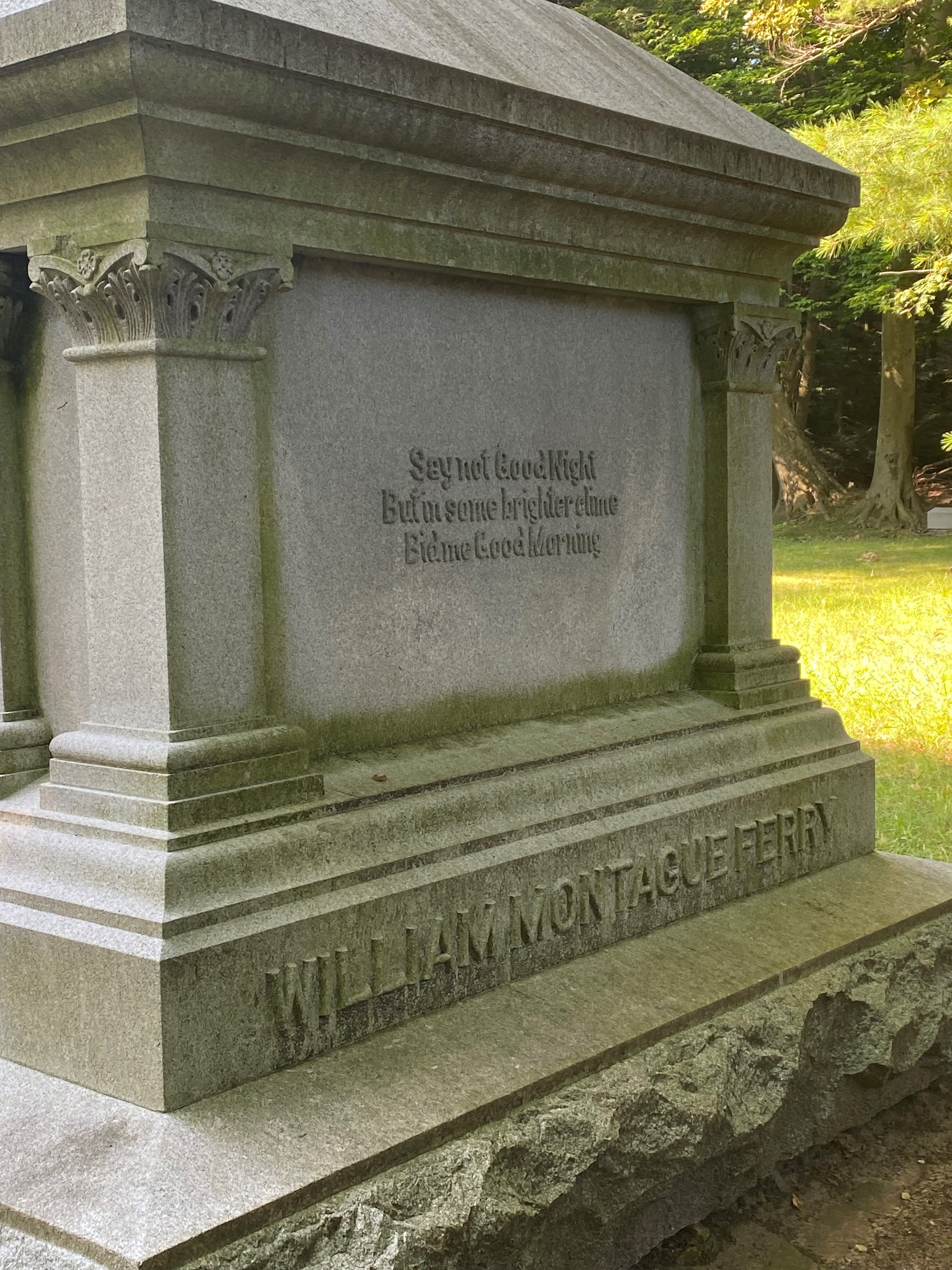
  Monument to William Montague Ferry in the Ferry Family Plot.

== Other ==
William Montague Ferry Park in Ferrysburg is named in his honor.

Ferry Street in Grand Haven, Ferry Street in Ferrysburg, and Ferry Elementary school in Grand Haven are also named in Ferry's honor.
