= Noah Henry Ferry =

Officer of the Michigan Cavalry Brigade

Major Noah Henry Ferry
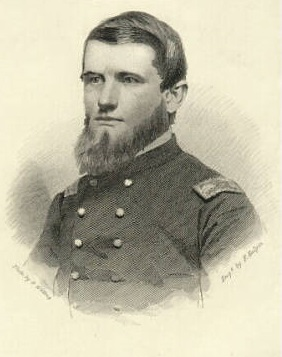
- Born: April 30, 1831; Mackinac Island
- Died: July 3, 1863 (aged 32); Gettysburg, Pennsylvania
- Burial place: Grand Haven, Michigan
- Military career
- Allegiance: United States
- Branch: Union Army
- Rank: Major
- Unit: 5th Michigan Cavalry Regiment
- Conflicts: Battle of Gettysburg

Noah Henry Ferry (April 30, 1831 – July 3, 1863), was a Major in the Union Army's 5th Michigan Cavalry. He died in the Battle of Gettysburg.

== Early life ==
Noah was born in 1831 to Rev. William Montague Ferry and his wife Amanda White Ferry. He was their fourth child and third son. His oldest brother William Montague Ferry Jr. was a Colonel in the Union Army (and later a politician), and his other older brother was U.S. Senator Thomas W. Ferry . The family lived at a Presbyterian missionary on Mackinac Island, where Rev. Ferry ministered to Native American's. In 1834, the Ferry family moved to Grand Haven. Here, the Ferry's started many successful businesses which included interests in lumber, iron, ship building, and banking

== Before the War ==
Noah took over the Ferry and Sons Sawmill in White River Township when he was just 23 years old. He was the township's wealthiest citizen, and largest employer.

== Civil War ==
During the Civil War, Noah and a group 102 men (many were his employees) enlisted as the "White River Guard." They elected Noah as their commander. The guard was combined with others and became the 5th Michigan Volunteer Cavalry. Noah Ferry was Major of the Regiment. The regiment went to Virginia to fight, and met up with Michigan's 1st, 6th, and 7th Brigade. They were collectively called The Michigan Cavalry Brigade.

Fighting in the war proved tiring and frustrating for The Michigan Cavalry Brigade. Tensions became high, in large part due to constant drunkenness of Colonel Freeman Norvell (the man in charge of The Michigan Cavalry Brigade). During one of Colonel Norvell drunken tirades, Major Ferry held a gun to his head and demanded he relinquish command of the Brigade. Ferry was triumphant in his battle of will. Colonel Norvell resigned and Ferry was offered the position of Colonel of the Brigade. Ferry turned down the role insisting he had not yet earned this position.

== Death at Gettysburg ==
When Ferry and his men got to Gettysburg, it was clear that this battle would be unlike one they had previously seen. While waiting for support from Brigadier General George Armstrong Custer's men, Ferry led 200 unmounted cavalrymen into battle, famously saying, "Rally boys, Rally for the fence" shortly before he was shot in the head, dying instantly.

== Legacy ==
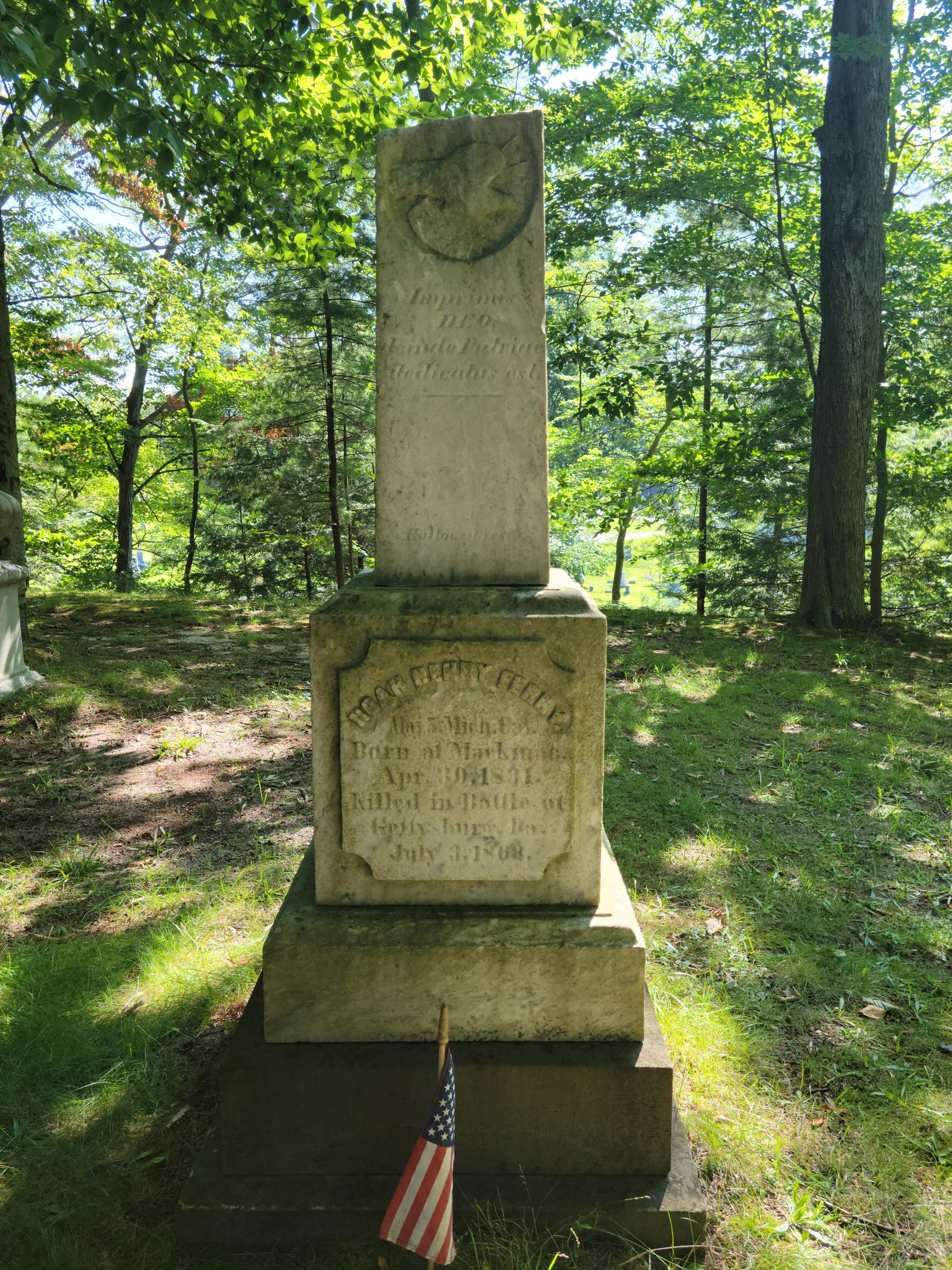
The final resting place of Major Noah Ferry.

General Custer's official report talked of the loss of "The brave and chivalric Major N. H. Ferry."

Colonel Russell Alger knew Ferry and his family. Col Alger was with Ferry the day he was killed. Alger wrote, "Major Ferry, who was cheering his battalion to hold its ground, was instantly killed. His death cast a deep gloom upon the whole Brigade. He was a gallant soldier, an exemplary man and his loss was a great blow." He also wrote, "(Ferry) wore the uniform of the Union because he could not conscientiously shirk the duty he felt that he owed the government, and relinquished fortune, home, ambition, life itself, for the cause of the Union."

Ferry's Body was buried under a tree on the battle field. Shortly afterwards, Noah's Father William Montague Ferry, and Brother Thomas W. Ferry went to recover his body. His body was brought back to Grand Haven where it lays in the Ferry plot of the Lake Forest Cemetery.

Though buried in Grand Haven, Ferry has the foremost stone in the Michigan section of the Gettysburg National Cemetery.

The main street of Montague Michigan, is named Ferry Street in Noah's Honor. Ferry Church in Montague is also named in Noah's honor.
