= Ferry Township, Michigan =

- Township
- Location within the state of Michigan Ferry Township, Michigan (the United States)
- Coordinates: 43°35′55″N 86°12′40″W
- Country: United States
- State: Michigan
- County: Oceana

Area
  - Total: 36.1 sq mi (93.6 km^{2})
  - Land: 36.0 sq mi (93.2 km^{2})
  - Water: 0.12 sq mi (0.3 km^{2})
- Elevation: 696 ft (212 m)

Population (2020)
  - Total: 1,271
  - Density: 35.3/sq mi (13.6/km^{2})
- Time zone: UTC-5 (Eastern (EST))
  - Summer (DST): UTC-4 (EDT)
- FIPS code: 26-27940
- GNIS feature ID: 1626279
- Website: https://www.ferrytownship.org/

Ferry Township is a civil township of Oceana County in the U.S. state of Michigan. The population was 1,271 at the 2020 census.

Ferry Township was established in 1869. It was named for U.S.representative and later U.S. senator from Michigan Thomas W. Ferry.

== Schools ==
Ferry was home to Ferry Community Schools for many years. In 1995 the school system changed and all students were part of Shelby Public Schools. Ferry Elementary closed after the 2006–2007 school year. The students were sent to other elementary schools in the Shelby Public School district.

== Geography ==
According to the United States Census Bureau, the township has a total area of 36.1 square miles (93 km^{2}), of which, 36.0 square miles (93 km^{2}) of it is land and 0.1 square miles (0.26 km^{2}) of it (0.36%) is water.

== Demographics ==
As of the census of 2000, there were 1,296 people, 475 households, and 361 families residing in the township. The population density was 36.0 inhabitants per square mile (13.9/km^{2}). There were 598 housing units at an average density of 16.6 per square mile (6.4/km^{2}). The racial makeup of the township was 91.44% White, 0.46% African American, 2.31% Native American, 0.08% Asian, 3.94% from other races, and 1.77% from two or more races. Hispanic or Latino of any race were 5.94% of the population.

There were 475 households, out of which 34.51% had children under the age of 18 living with them, 60.8% were married couples living together, 8.0% had a female householder with no husband present, and 23.8% were non-families. 18.5% of all households were made up of individuals, and 6.5% had someone living alone who was 65 years of age or older. The average household size was 2.69 and the average family size was 3.04.

In the township the population was spread out, with 27.4% under the age of 18, 7.3% from 18 to 24, 28.9% from 25 to 44, 27.1% from 45 to 64, and 9.4% who were 65 years of age or older. The median age was 37 years. For every 100 females, there were 118.9 males. For every 100 females age 18 and over, there were 111.0 males.

The median income for a household in the township was $35,170, and the median income for a family was $38,571. Males had a median income of $31,625 versus $21,375 for females. The per capita income for the township was $16,212. About 7.7% of families and 13.5% of the population were below the poverty line, including 15.1% of those under age 18 and 13.4% of those age 65 or over.
