= Thomas Whyte =

Thomas Whyte may refer to:

- Thomas Whyte (merchant) (1492–1567), English cloth merchant, Lord Mayor of London in 1553, and a civic benefactor and founder of St John's College, Oxford
- Thomas Whyte (academic) (fl. 1553–1573), English academic administrator at the University of Oxford
- Thomas Whyte (died 1580), English state official who informed on his co-conspirators in a plot to remove Queen Mary I of England in favour of her sister Elizabeth

== See also ==
- Thomas White (disambiguation)
- Thomas Wight (disambiguation)
