= William Thomas (bishop of Worcester) =

Welsh Anglican bishop (1613–1689)

William Thomas (2 February 1613 – 25 June 1689) was a Welsh Anglican bishop. He was ejected from his living at Laugharne during the English Civil War. He was restored in 1660 and became the Bishop of St David's and later the Bishop of Worcester.

== Life ==
Thomas was educated at Carmarthen Grammar School, and matriculated at St John's College, Oxford in 1629, graduating from Jesus College, Oxford with a BA degree in 1632 and an MA degree in 1635. He became a fellow of Jesus College. After ordination as deacon in 1637 and as priest in 1638, Thomas became vicar of Penbryn in Ceredigion and chaplain to Algernon Percy, 10th Earl of Northumberland. With the apparent help of his patron, he also became vicar of Laugharne and Llansadwrn, Carmarthenshire. He was incumbent at Laugharne and Llansadurnen from 1639 until 1644. In that year he was famously ejected from the church at pistol point by the Cromwellian cavalry and later deprived of his livings Throughout the Commonwealth period he kept a private school in the town, which continued until 1670. He was re-instated at the restoration of Charles II and remained as vicar until 1683 when he was transferred from his St Davids see. Thomas was rewarded for his brave loyalty by being immediately appointed as precentor of St David's Cathedral in 1660 and was awarded the Oxford degree of Doctor of Divinity. In the following year, Edward Hyde, 1st Earl of Clarendon had him promoted by the crown to the living of Llanbedr Felffre, Pembrokeshire. He was noticed by James, Duke of York (later King James II) who appointed him as one of his chaplains. He became dean of Worcester in 1665 and continued to hold his deanery ‘in commendam' after leaving Laugharne when translated to the see of Worcester. He was elected Bishop of St David's on 19 November 1677 and consecrated on 27 January 1678; he was allowed to remain in his position as Dean of Worcester. He was regarded as an active bishop, with strong family links to west Wales and fluency in the Welsh language. He was translated to Worcester in 1683, gaining a reputation for generosity to the poor in his time there. He died in Worcester in 1689, and was buried in the cathedral cloisters. His tomb was designed by Thomas White.

In Antiquities of Laugharne p. 101 Mary Curtis records “He faithfully served Church and State in this See until the Revolution of 1688, when, refusing to take the oath of allegiance to William III, he would have been turned out of his See had not his death intervened to spare him this indignity. His objections to the oath were conscientious, and could not be overcome.’’ In a letter to a friend, he says: If my heart do not deceive me, and God’s grace do not fail me, I think I could suffer at the stake rather than take this oath.” I have obtained this account of Rev. W. Thomas from ‘ Curiosities of the Pulpit,’ by Rev. Prebendary Jackson. It is surprising that Mr. Thomas should hesitate to take this oath, or could be so blind to the miseries and dangerous state James II's policy was bringing on the country, and that any faithful Protestant clergyman could uphold a popish sovereign.”

Church of England titles
Preceded by Thomas Warmestry	Dean of Worcester; 1665–1683	Succeeded by George Hickes
Preceded by William Lucy	Bishop of St David's; 1677–1683	Succeeded by Lawrence Womach
Preceded by James Fleetwood	Bishop of Worcester; 1683–1689	Succeeded by Edward Stillingfleet
