= Thomas W. White (born 1805) =

American politician (1805–1884)

Member of the Michigan House of Representatives from the Ottawa County district
- In office January 1, 1844 – March 12, 1844

Personal details
- Born: November 15, 1805 Ashfield, Massachusetts
- Died: January 9, 1884 (aged 78)
- Party: Whig; Republican
- Spouse: Caroline Norton
- Children: 3

Thomas W. White (November 15, 1805 – January 9, 1884) was a Michigan politician.

== Early life ==
White was born on November 15, 1805. In 1836, White settled in Grand Haven, Michigan.

== Career ==
In Grand Haven, White worked as a lumberjack. On November 6, 1843, White was elected to the Michigan House of Representatives where he represented the Ottawa County district from January 1, 1844, to March 12, 1844. At first, White was a Whig, but later, he became a Republican. After 30 years of living in Grand Haven, White moved to Grand Rapids, Michigan.

== Personal life ==
White married Caroline Norton and had three children. White was the uncle of United States Senator Thomas White Ferry.

== Death ==
White died on January 9, 1884.
