= Thomas Wight (Bandon) =

Thomas Wight, 1640–1724, was a native of Bandon, County Cork, Ireland, and author of the first History of the Quakers in Ireland. His father was Rice Wight, Church of Ireland minister of Bandon and a son of Thomas Wight, A.M. (fl. 1619-49) also a minister.

While a clothier's apprentice, Wight attended Quaker meeting out of curiosity. He was impressed by a speech by Francis Howgill - "Before the eye can see, it must be opened; before the ear can hear, it must unstopped; and before the heart can understand, it must be illuminated." Edward Burrough was a further influence in causing Wight to move away from the Church of Ireland to becoming a Quaker himself.

He married in 1670 and had a large family. According to the History of Bandon.

"His increased responsibilities induced him to attend very closely to his business-which was not confined to the clothing trade alone, he being also engaged as a commission agent-and in all likelihood Wight would have been in a short time a wealthy man, had he not been providentially stopped in his sinful career by an illumination direct from heaven, which threw a great deal of light into his dark mind, causing him to reflect much, and satisfying him "that he could not be heir to two kingdoms at once." He saw his great danger, and, like a thorough Christian he flung all his worldly gains to the winds, and devoted himself entirely to the truth. Being an able scribe, he was appointed clerk to the meeting in Cork, and for the province of Munster. He was also the compiler of an historical account of The first rise and progress of the truth in this nation, which he perfected in the form of annuls, up to the year 1700."
