= Edward Payson Ferry =

American businessman (1837–1917)

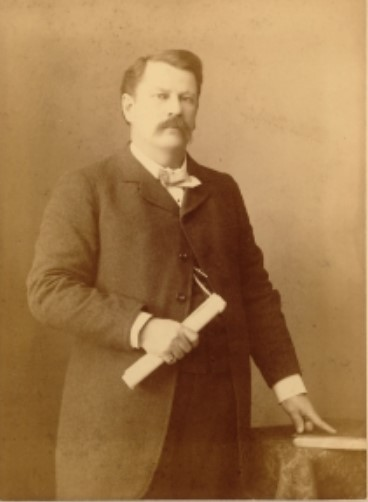
- Born: April 16, 1837; Grand Haven, Michigan, US
- Died: April 11, 1917 (aged 79); Los Angeles, California, US
- Resting place: Lake Forest Cemetery, Grand Haven
- Occupation: Mining Magnate
- Family: Ferry family

Edward Payson Ferry (1837–1917) was a businessman/mining magnate from Michigan and Utah. He is a prominent member of the Ferry Family.

== Early life in Michigan ==
Edward lived his early childhood in Grand Haven. He worked with his father, William Montague Ferry in the various Ferry businesses. When his father died on December 30, 1867, Edward was the executor of the Ferry's estate and was given a wide range of responsibilities.

Ferry was an avid reader and collector of books. Books were hard to come by in the mid-19th century, but Ferry knew they should be available for all to read. Ferry used a space above his office for a public reading room and also lent out many books. Upon the establishment of the Grand Haven Library Association, Ferry was appointed president.

== Utah ==
Shortly after his father's death, Edward invested resources in mining opportunities in Utah. At first, his mines failed. Various heirs backed the venture to make good on all liabilities against the estate. Edward himself moved to Utah Territory to manage the investments. In Utah Territory, Edward proved to be very effective in buying and developing premium mining properties. Using Ferry Estate capital to recoup his earlier losses, he turned everything around to amass a large fortune. These developments would later create a conflict that would be taken to the Supreme Court, which would set precedent for case law concerning using estate funds.

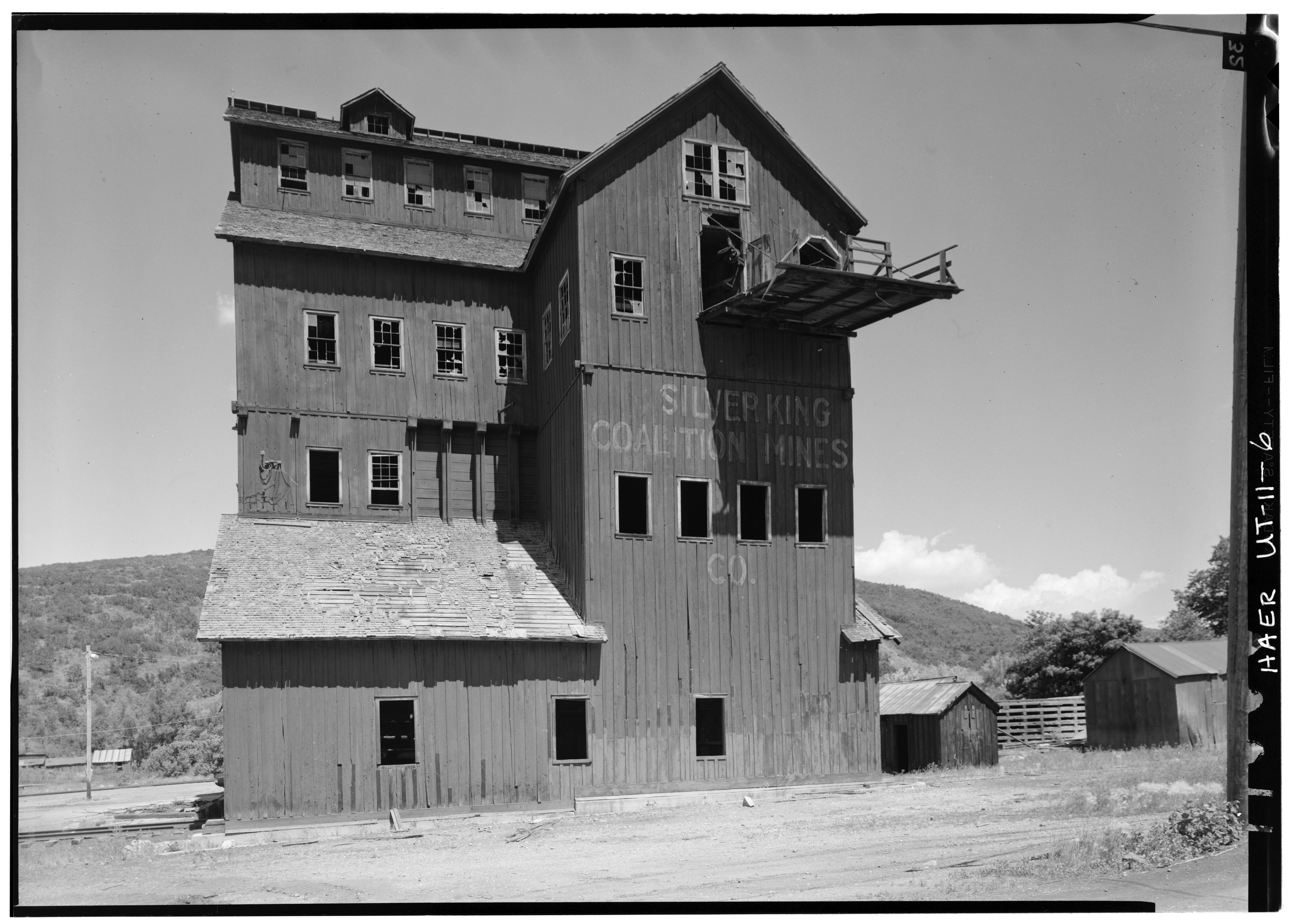
Remains of the famed Silver King Mine building in 1971. One of many mines owned by Ferry.

In Utah, Edward Ferry was able to make a name for himself apart from his father William Montague Ferry, and his infamous brother Senator Thomas W. Ferry. Ferry's businesses were well known across the Western United States. He was one of the most successful silver mine speculators of the late 1800s. He founded the Marsac Silver Mining Company in 1874, and had chief interests in Silver King Coalition Mines Company(once the most profitable mine in the world), the Anchor Mine, Walker Brothers Bankers, and the Utah Savings and Trust Company. After only a few years, Ferry became known as one of the leading businessmen of the West. He played a critical role in the formation of the Trans-Mississippi Congress (of which he was president). Ferry was also quite socially engaged in Park City, and throughout all of Utah. He was an active member of the Alta Club, the University Club, as well as being a Knight Templar.

== Family ==
Part of Edward's mining fortune was used to pay off the debts of his older brother, Senator Thomas W. Ferry. Thomas had amassed millions in debts after his lumber and steel businesses went bankrupt.

Edward Payson Ferry married Clara Virginia White, a second cousin who worked as a teacher. Clara died in a horseback riding accident. They had two sons in the early 1870s of note.

Their first son was William Montague Ferry, born on March 12, 1871, named after his grandfather, who had recently passed. This son later became president of the Utah State Senate from 1911 to 1915 and Mayor of Salt Lake City from 1915 to 1919.

His second son, Edward Steward Ferry, was born in 1872 in Grand Haven. He was an 1896 graduate of University of Michigan Law School. He became a prominent Salt Lake City attorney with influential political connections. Edward Steward Ferry participated in a US Supreme court case against his cousin, Henry Clay Hall Jr., in April 1913. His side lost the case. He committed suicide on June 11, 1913. His body was brought back to Grand Haven, Michigan, to be buried in the family plot.

== Edward P. Ferry House ==
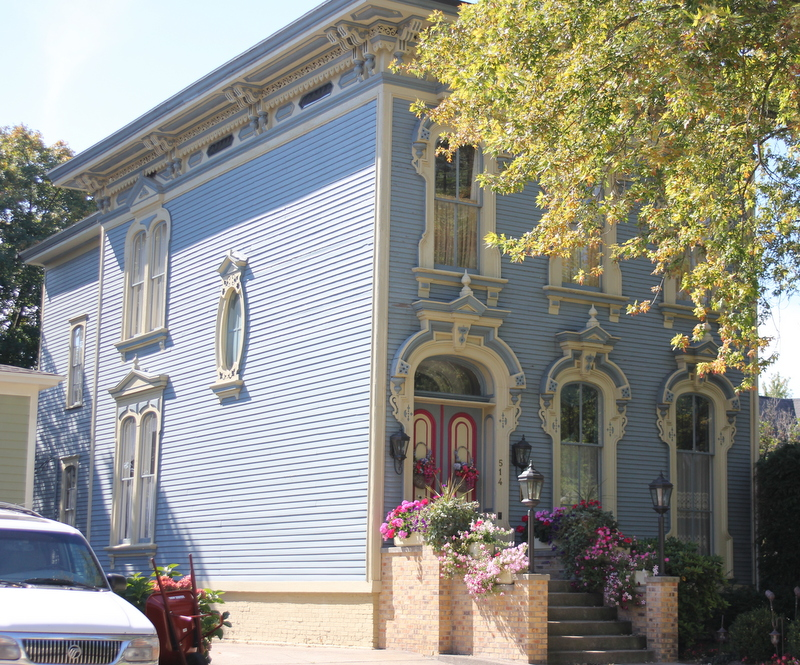
Ferry's Grand Haven home

Edward's Grand Haven home, the Edward P. Ferry House, is listed on the National Register of Historic Places.
