= Thomas Wight (priest) =

English cleric, Dean of Cork

Thomas Wight, A.M., was an English churchman, elected Dean of Cork. He was grandfather of the Quaker, Thomas Wight, who wrote A History of the Rise and Progress of the People called Quakers in Ireland.

A native of Guildford, Surrey, he was ordained deacon and priest by John, Bishop of Oxford, on 23 October 1619. In 1620 he became prebendary of Kilmacdonogh, Cloyne, and in 1628 vicar of Ballymodan, Bandon.

In 1634 he was appointed prebendary of Kilnaglory. From 1628 to 1649, he was rector of Aghlishdrinagh. In 1628 he was elected dean of Cork by the chapter, but the crown declined to ratify the appointment.

According to the "History of Bandon":

"Dr. Brady, from whose valuable records we have derived the above information, thinks Wight was induced to settle in this country by the Boyle family".
