= Thomas White (sculptor) =

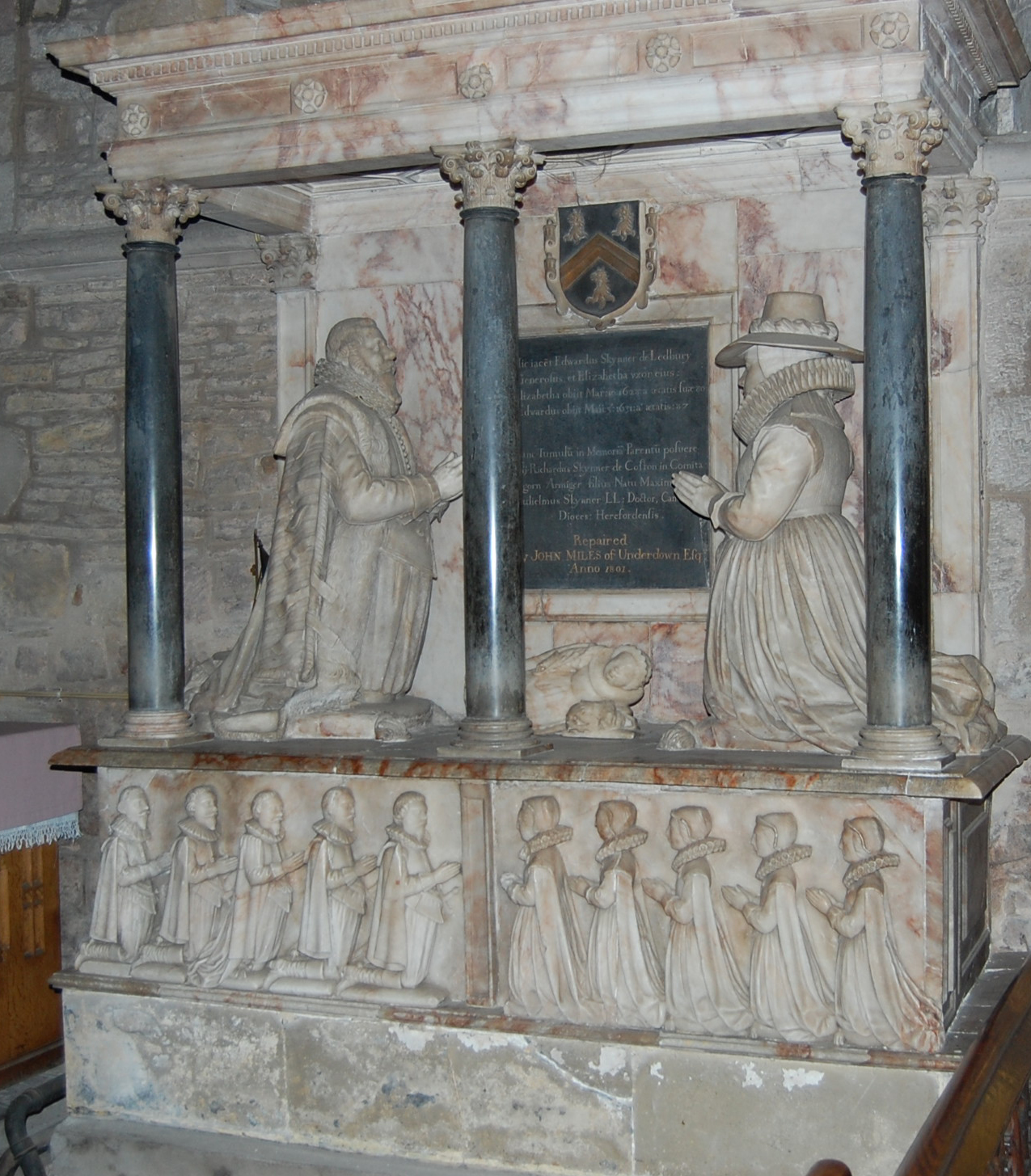
Admiral Skynner Memorial in Ledbury Church

Thomas White of Worcester (1674–1748) was an 18th century British sculptor and architect.

== Life ==
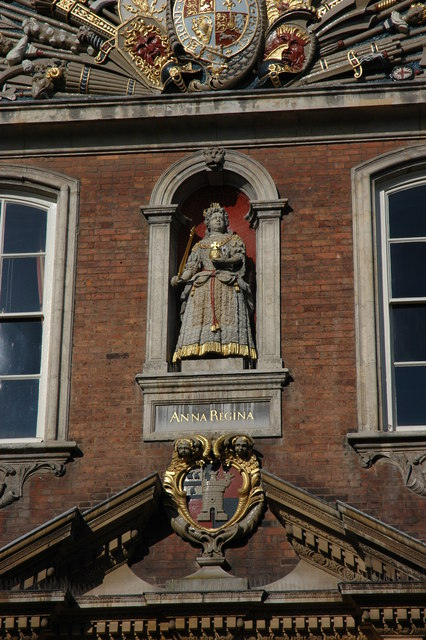
Statue of Queen Anne on Worcester Guildhall

He was born and raised in Worcester. He went to London around 1686 and became apprenticed to a stonemason in the Piccadilly district. Some sources also state that he was a pupil of Christopher Wren. His architectural works do bear some similarities. Working in a stoneyard in central London in this period would have certainly brought him into contact with Wren.

Having served his apprenticeship he returned to Worcester around 1694 and in 1709 the city declared him a Freeman of the City for his fine statue of Queen Anne which sits above the entrance of the city's Guildhall.

He spent most of his working life in Worcester but created work of very high quality. From around 1720 he began to receive commissions for churches. He operated two stoneyards: one in Worcester and one in Shrewsbury.

He died unmarried in 1748. In his will he left a substantial sum to the newly built Worcester Infirmary.

== Works ==
- Tomb of Adam Cave in All Saint's Church in Evesham (1698)
- Tomb of Bishop Thomas in Worcester Cathedral (c.1700)
- Tomb of Mrs Nanfan at Birtsmorton parish church (1704)
- Tomb of Sir John Turton in Alrewas parish church (1707)
- Statue of Queen Anne, Worcester Guildhall (1709)
- Statue of King Charles I in Worcester (1712)
- Monument to Sir John Bridgeman, 2nd Baronet in Llanyblodwel (1719)
- Monument to Henrietta Wrottesley in Worcester Cathedral (1720)
- Statue of Bishop Hough on All Saint's Church in Worcester (c.1720)
- Decorative carvings at Worcester Guildhall (1721 to 1724)
- Monument to Admiral Skynner in Ledbury (1725)
- Monument to Rev Josiah Foster in Aston, Birmingham (1727)
- Figure of Britannia on a house in Worcester
- Bust of King George II of Great Britain on Edgar's Tower in Worcester
- Monument to Mary Lyster in St Mary's Church in Shrewsbury (1730)
- John the Baptist Church in Gloucester (1732)
- Monument to John Holte in Ripple, Worcestershire (1735)
- St Swithin's Church, Worcester (1736)
- All Saint's Church, Worcester (1738-1742)
- Monument to George Peyton in Tewkesbury Abbey (1742)
- Monument to John Brydges at Bosbury (1742)
- Monument to Roger Mathews in Llanyblodwel (1748)
- St Nicholas Church, Worcester (dnk)
