= Thomas White (Michigan politician) =

American politician

Member of the Michigan House of Representatives from the Washtenaw County 2nd district
- In office January 1, 1867 – December 31, 1868
- Succeeded by: James Kingsley

Personal details
- Born: Royalton, New York
- Died: May 10, 1868
- Party: Democratic; Free Soil; Republican (Dates of party changes unknown)

Thomas White (died May 10, 1868) was a Michigan politician.

== Early life ==
White was born in Royalton, New York. There, he received an education.

== Career ==
White moved to Novi, Michigan, in 1833 upon settling on a farm. In 1852, White moved to Northfield Township, Michigan, and settled on another farm. In 1868, White moved once again, to Ann Arbor, Michigan, where he worked for a county insurance company as a secretary and managing director. On November 6, 1866, White was elected to the Michigan House of Representatives, where he represented the Washtenaw County 2nd district from January 2, 1867, to December 31, 1868. At some point, White was a Democrat, and then a Free Soiler, but by the time of his term in the state house, he was a Republican.

== Death ==
White died on May 10, 1868.
