= Thomas S. White Jr. =

- Born: September 7, 1943 (age 81); San Diego, California, U.S.
- Education: Duke University
- Occupation: Asset manager
- Known for: Value investing methodology

Thomas S. White Jr. (born September 7, 1943) is an American asset manager residing in Chicago who is the founder, chairman and president of Thomas White International, Ltd.

== Early professional life ==
After graduating from Duke University in 1965, White joined Goldman Sachs & Co, entering a small executive trainee class that included future Treasury Secretary Robert Rubin and future leveraged-buyout manager Henry Kravis.

After Goldman, he worked at Lehman Bros. and Blyth, Eastman Dillon before establishing his firm, Thomas White & Associates. During this period he began a close working relationship with John Templeton and developed his proprietary method of value investing based on identifying the analytical tools appropriate to country, region or industry group.

White later became a Managing Director of the Chicago office of Morgan Stanley Asset Management. During his 14-year tenure as CIO for institutional value style portfolios and funds for the firm, he founded the Chicago Group, an independent arm of Morgan Stanley Asset Management.

== Thomas White International ==
In 1992, White founded Thomas White International, Ltd. a money management and research firm based in Chicago. As Chief Investment Officer, he heads the firm’s Investment Team. The firm currently manages three mutual funds.
