= Henry Clay Hall =

American politician

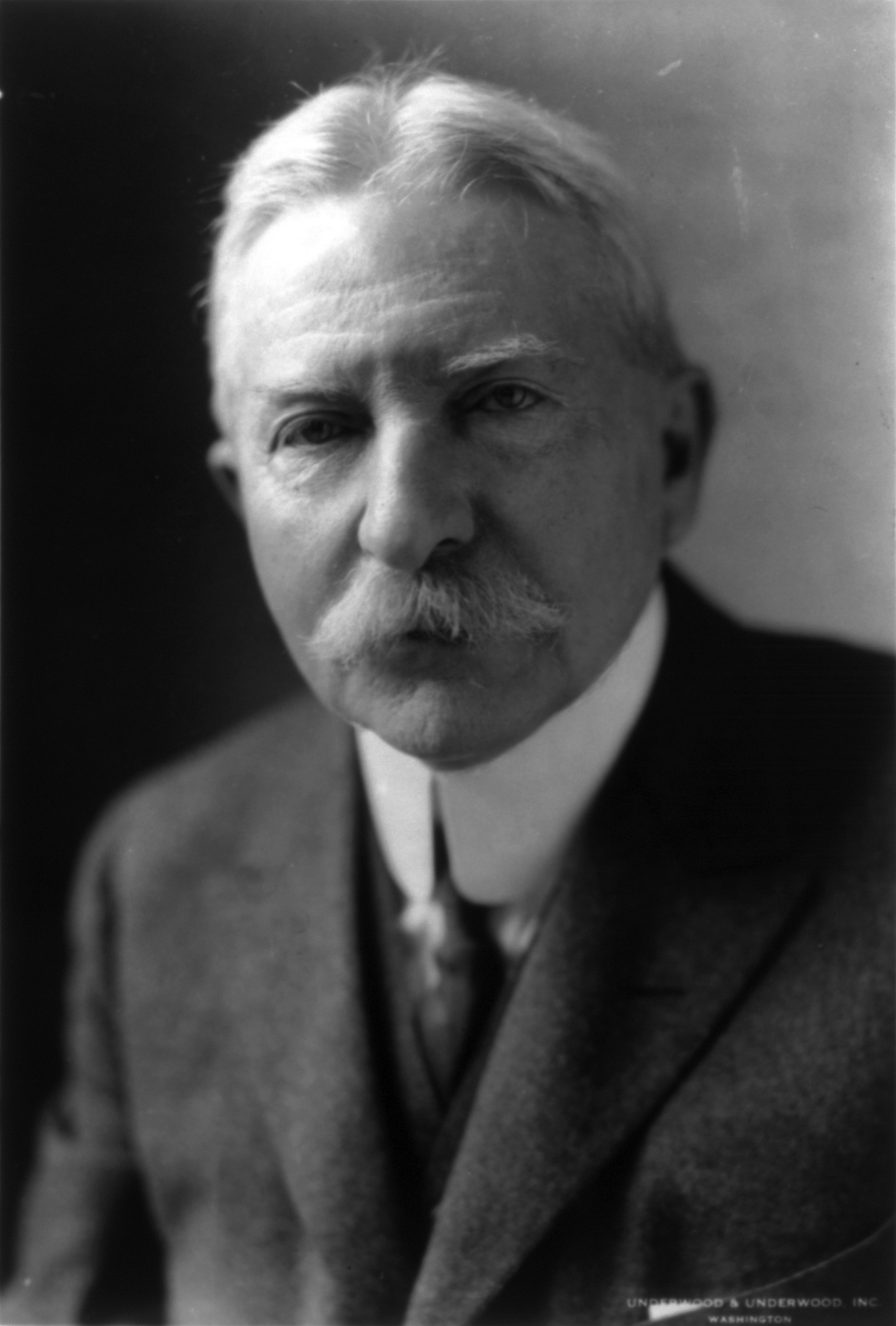

Interstate Commerce Commission
- In office 1914–1928

Mayor City of Colorado Springs, Colorado 1905-1907

Henry Clay Hall Jr. (January 3, 1860 – November 9, 1936) was an American attorney and commissioner of the Interstate Commerce Commission, appointed by president Woodrow Wilson in 1914 and who served on the Commission from March 21, 1914, to January 13, 1928. He served as Chairman of the Commission from 1917 to 1918 and again in 1924.

== Biography ==
He was born on January 3, 1860, to Henry Clay Hall Sr. and Amanda Harwood Ferry in New York City. Hall attended Amherst College and graduated in 1881, and received an LL.B. from Columbia Law School in 1883. He was admitted to the New York City Bar Association in 1883. After briefly practicing in New York, he moved to Paris, where he worked with his brother in law, Edmond Kelly, and in 1888, became counsel to the American Legation in Paris.

Hall returned to the United States in 1892 for health reasons. Hall planned to journey to California for his health but stopped off to visit a brother in Colorado Springs, Colorado, and found he liked the place so much that he settled there.

== Politician and railroad attorney ==
Hall resumed the practice of law in Colorado, becoming a major corporation lawyer and became mayor of Colorado Springs from 1905 to 1907. He became general attorney for the Arkansas, Louisiana & Gulf Railway and served as counsel for many corporations. He became President of the Bar in Colorado, and state vice-president of the American Bar Association.

== Commissioner ==
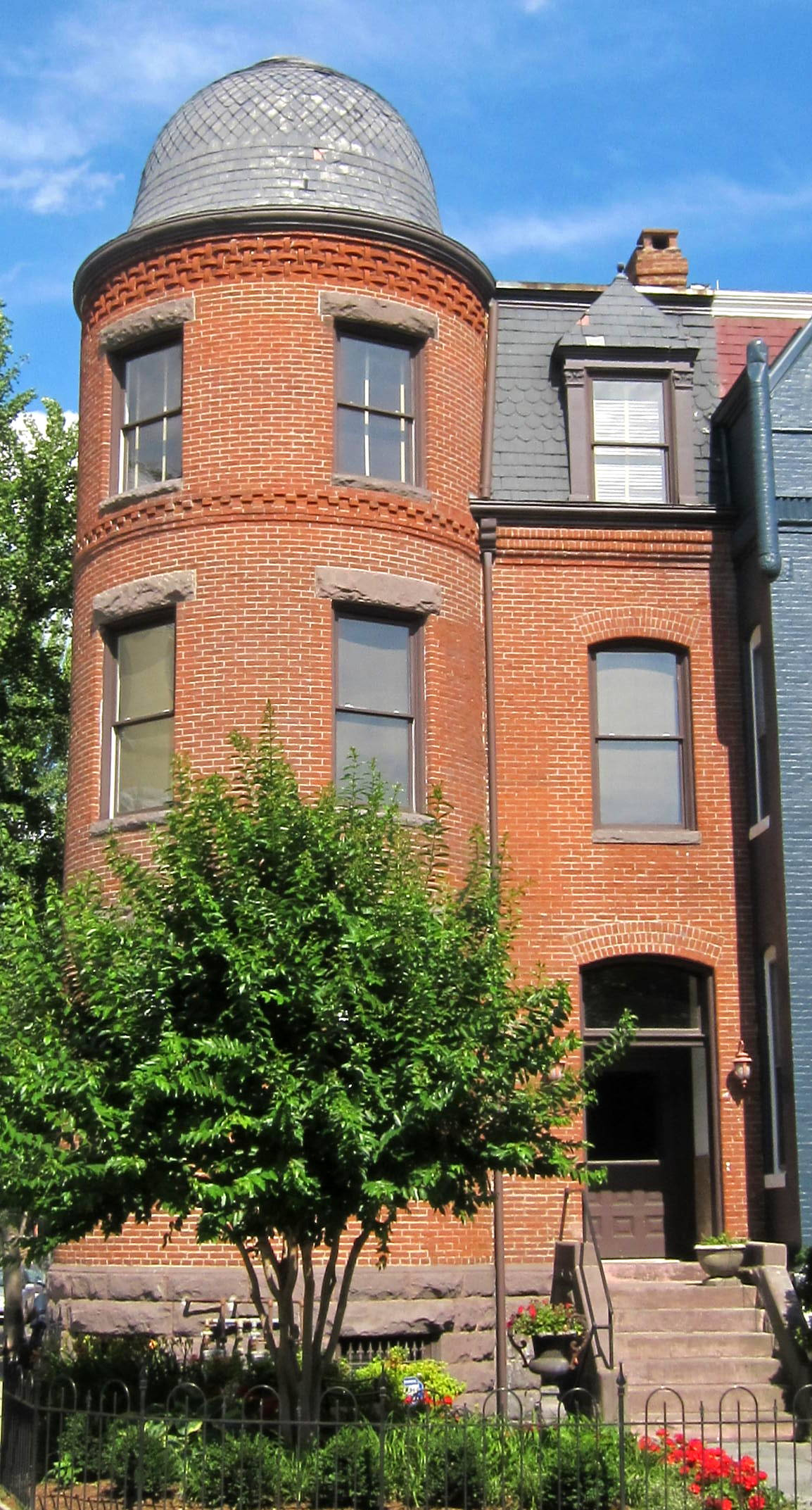
Hall's former residence in Washington, D.C.

In early 1914, Interstate Commerce Commission commissioner Charles A. Prouty resigned to take the job as head of the Commission's Division of Valuation, and to run for the Senate in Vermont. This, in combination with the death in November 1913 of commissioner John Hobart Marble of California following an attack of acute indigestion, gave President Woodrow Wilson two seats to fill on the Commission. Wilson selected Winthrop More Daniels of New Jersey to fill Marble's seat, and Hall to fill Prouty's. This preserved the geographic balance on the Commission.

Hall was the first commissioner from the Rocky Mountain region. He served as Commission Chairman from 1917–18 and in 1924.

Hall took the lead on the Commission in the Shreveport rate case, in which the Commission determined it could regulate intrastate freight. This position was upheld by the Supreme Court In 1921, Hall was reappointed for another seven-year term by President Harding.

In late 1927, Hall submitted his resignation to President Calvin Coolidge, effective on the appointment of a replacement. He left the Commission in 1928.

== Later life ==
Hall died on November 9, 1936, at his home in Ashfield, Massachusetts. He was survived by his second wife, the former Alice Munsell Sweetser of New York, whom he had wed in 1905, by their daughter, and by four children by his first marriage to Mary Bacon Barstow, who had died in 1901.

== See also ==
- List of mayors of Colorado Springs, Colorado
- Ferry Family
