= Mission House (Mackinac Island) =

- U.S. National Register of Historic Places
- Michigan State Historic Site
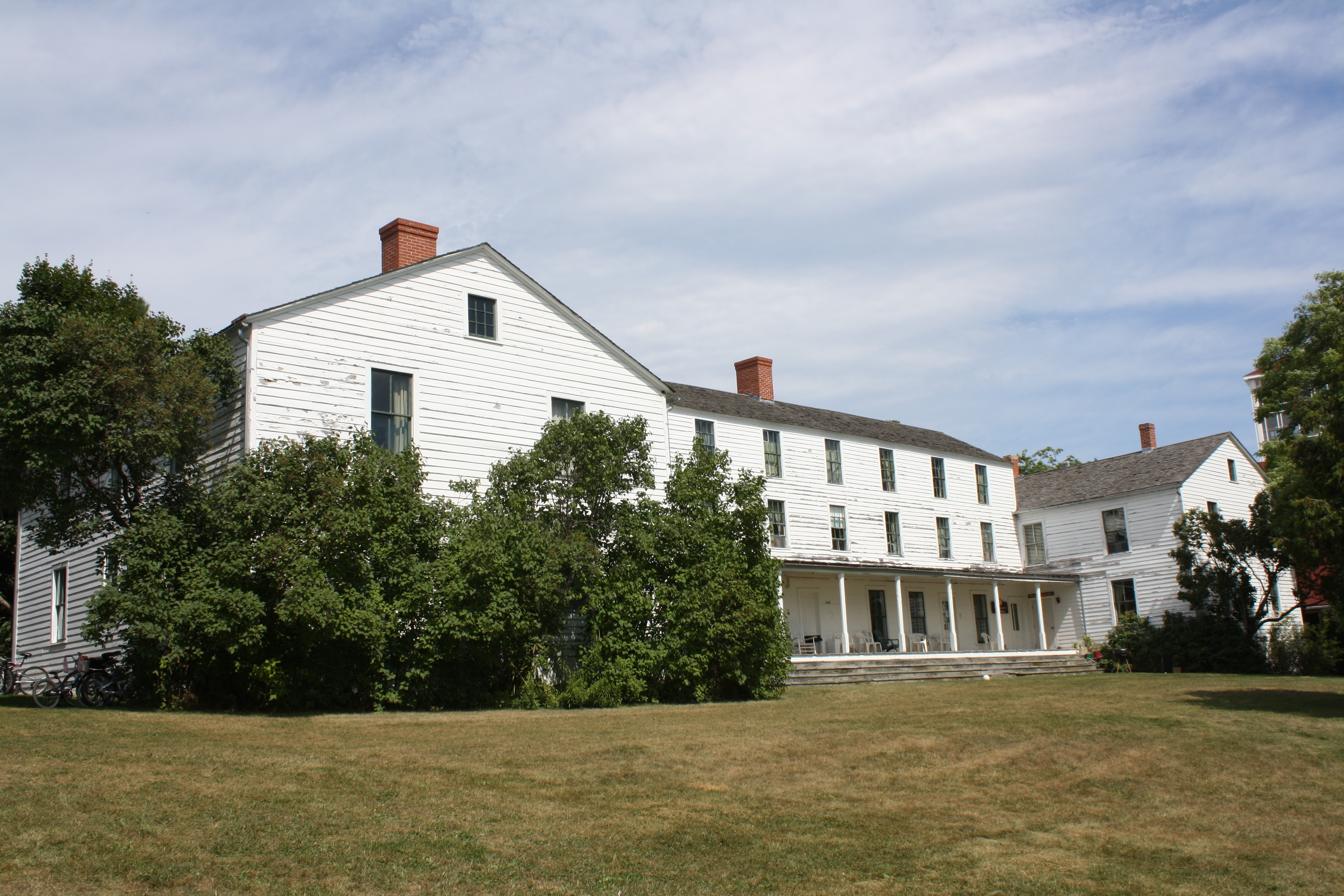
- Mission House in 2011

- Location within Michigan Location within the United States
- Interactive map
- Location: Huron St, Mackinac Island, Michigan
- Coordinates: 45°51′4″N 84°36′26″W
- Area: 1 acre (0.40 ha)
- Built: 1825
- Built by: Martin Heydenburk
- NRHP reference No.: 71000410
- Added to NRHP: April 16, 1971

The Mission House, on Mackinac Island, is a historic structure owned by the state of Michigan. Built in 1825, it is listed on the National Register of Historic Places and is operated as part of the Mackinac Island State Park. The Mission House is a wood-frame structure covered in clapboard siding and constructed in a U shape. The center section is three stories, and the flanking wings are two stories. The front facade has a single-story porch covering the entrance in the center.

== Construction ==
In 1823, missionaries William Montague Ferry and his wife Amanda founded a mission on the southeast corner of Mackinac Island at the location since known as Mission Point. In 1825, this mission house was built at the site by a building crew led by Martin Heydenburk, a fellow missionary who was a teacher and carpenter. It is the centerpiece of a major effort by the American Board of Commissioners for Foreign Missions to disseminate Christianity among the Native Americans of the upper Great Lakes. It is also a standing remnant of the fur trade era of Great Lakes history.

Mission Point marks the southeast corner of Mackinac Island.

== Dormitory ==
The Mission House was designed as an American Indian boarding school for students of Native American, meti, and Euro-American ancestry. The students were boarded at the school, taught manual crafts and rudimentary liberal arts, and trained to adopt the standards and living patterns characteristic of New England and the American East Coast. In 1827, 112 students were enrolled in the school.

The Mission House was constructed as a two-story building. It was built in a spare, utilitarian style suitable for its purpose. There has been little exterior decoration on the building since its original construction in 1825. The dormitory structure was built with local sawn timbers from nearby Dousman's Mill, and a close study of these timbers enabled archeologists to reconstruct what kind of steel saw had been used to cut the logs and even how fast the saw blade had moved.

The Mission House was the largest structure of a complex that also included a church, the Mission Church (built 1829–30), and nearby fields for training students in agriculture. The Ferry family lived in this house for 12 years, from 1825 until 1837. Here their son, Thomas W. Ferry, a future U.S. Senator, was born in 1827.

== Hotel ==
The Mackinac Mission never succeeded in financially supporting itself and, in the late 1830s, its functions were undermined by the decline of the upper Great Lakes fur trade. In 1837, Michigan Territory was admitted to the Union as a state, and the Ferry family moved to what was to become Grand Haven. The Mackinac mission complex was abandoned.

The decline of the fur trade was caused by "civilization" and the increasing immigration of settlers and homesteaders into Michigan. For many decades in the early and mid-19th century, Mackinac Island was a key junction point for the short-run lake steamboats of the day. Many immigrants to Lake Michigan changed boats at Mackinac Island, and needed places to stay during their stopovers. In 1849 Edward Franks bought the unused Mission House, added a third story to the two-story structure, and reopened it as a hotel/boarding house. He did not change the structure's name.

For a brief period in 1862, the hotel was used to hold three Confederate political prisoners while quarters were being prepared for them at Fort Mackinac. After the Civil War, pleasure travel increased in northern Michigan, and the Mission House readapted itself as a somewhat spartan excursion resort. As the 20th century began, however, the aging building was increasingly ill-adapted to provide a comfortable experience to travelers. The Great Depression dealt the Mission House a blow from which it could not recover. The hotel, still operated by the Franks family, closed in 1939.

== Moral Re-Armament and living space ==
Once again unused, the Mission House found a new owner in 1946 as the temporary base of the Moral Re-Armament movement. Under the leadership of the Rev. Frank Buchman, MRA made Mackinac Island their world headquarters and built a large conference center to the east of the old dormitory. MRA decided to convert the center on Mackinac Island into a liberal arts college in 1965. The college did not prove successful and closed after graduating its first class in 1970. The following year MRA officially ceased activity on Mackinac Island and divested itself of its island holdings, selling most of it to Rev. Rex Humbard of Akron, Ohio. Rev. Humbard's attempts to operate a resort and revive the college were short lived, owing to other financial difficulties in his organization, and ceased in 1973. In 1977 a Dallas-based property and investment firm purchased the property and converted it into the “Mackinac Hotel and Conference Center.” Fearing that the historic 1825 Mission House would not survive much longer, the Mackinac Island State Park Commission purchased it from the Humbard organization and restored it. Its interior was remodeled into living space for Mackinac State Historic Park's seasonal workers. The interior is not open to the public.

== Representation in other media ==
In 1863 Edward Everett Hale published a fictional story called The Man Without a Country. It opened with the sentence: “I was stranded at the old Mission House in Mackinaw, waiting for a Lake Superior steamer which did not choose to come.” However, in his lifetime Hale visited neither Mackinac nor Michigan.

In his 1893 and 1900 reminiscences, E.E. Hale stated that ‘To write the story of “The Man Without a Country” and its sequel, “Philip Nolan’s Friends,” I had to make as careful a study as I could of the history of the acquisition of Louisiana by the United States.’ In Hale's many publications, he described other locations that he had never seen. He was able to do this because he had extensive libraries and publications available to him. Hale was a writer, editor, and Unitarian minister who resided in and traveled throughout New England; he visited Texas once.

== Registered historic site ==
The Mission House was listed on the National Registry of Historic Sites in 1971, and was listed in the Michigan Registry of Historic Sites in 1993. It is Michigan Historic Site #SO313. A historic marker was erected.
