= Thomas W. Ferry =

American politician (1827–1896)

Thomas White Ferry
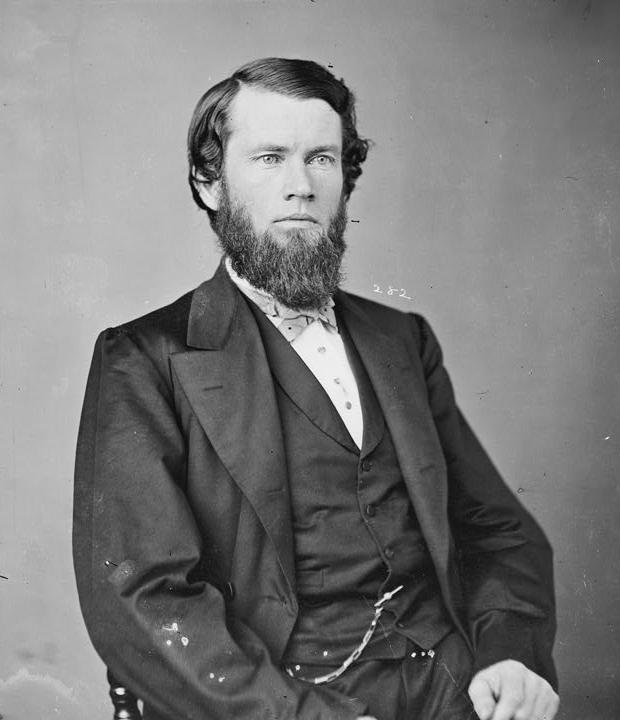
- Ferry, 1865–1880

President pro tempore of the United States Senate
- In office March 9, 1875 – March 17, 1879
- Preceded by: Henry B. Anthony
- Succeeded by: Allen G. Thurman

United States Senator from Michigan
- In office March 4, 1871 – March 3, 1883
- Preceded by: Jacob M. Howard
- Succeeded by: Thomas W. Palmer

Member of the U.S. House of Representatives from Michigan's 4th district
- In office March 4, 1865 – March 3, 1871
- Preceded by: Francis William Kellogg
- Succeeded by: Wilder D. Foster

Member of the Michigan Senate
- In office 1856

Member of the Michigan House of Representatives
- In office 1850–1852

Personal details
- Born: June 10, 1827 Mackinac Island, Michigan Territory
- Died: October 13, 1896 (aged 69) Grand Haven, Michigan, US
- Party: Republican
- Profession: Politician, Merchant

Thomas White Ferry (June 10, 1827 – October 13, 1896) represented Michigan in the United States House of Representatives and then in the United States Senate. Ferry served as president pro tempore of the Senate during the 44th and 45th Congresses, notably being ranked during the vice presidential vacancy between November 22, 1875 and March 4, 1877 as "Acting Vice President".

== Early life ==
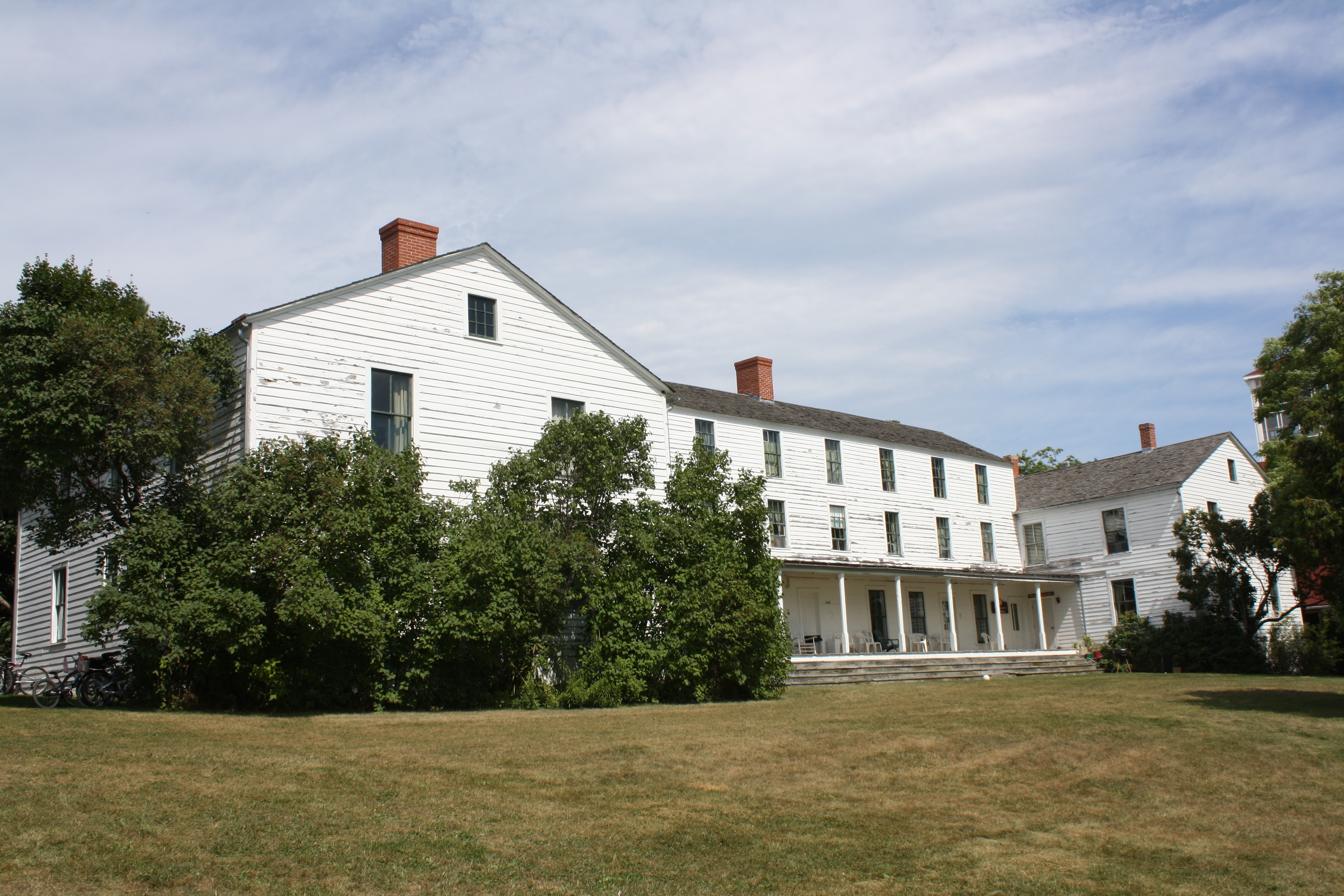
Ferry's birthplace, Old Mission House on Mackinac Island.

Ferry was born in the old Mission House on Mackinac Island in the Territory of Michigan. The community on Mackinac at that time included the military garrison, the main depot of John Jacob Astor's American Fur Company, and the mission. His father, Rev. William Montague Ferry, was a Presbyterian pastor, and his mother was Amanda White Ferry. His parents ran the mission school on the island. William Ferry was also the pastor of the Protestant church on the island. Thomas moved in 1834 with his parents to Grand Haven, Michigan, attended the public schools. He worked as a store clerk in Elgin, Illinois, from 1843 to 1845 before returning to Michigan. At the age of 21 he was elected clerk of Ottawa County.

In addition to English, Ferry was fluent in Ottawa, Chippewa, and French.

== Political career ==
=== State legislator ===
Ferry was a member of the Michigan State House of Representatives from 1850 to 1852 and a member of the Michigan State Senate in 1856. On January 26, 1857, Ferry, along with his father, platted the village of Ferrysburg, Michigan.

=== Years between state and federal office ===
In 1862 Ferry became a director of the new Grand Haven Union High School and was superintendent for ten years. He went into the lumbering business with his brother, Edward Payson Ferry. Before the Civil War he served on the Republican State Central Committee for eight years and was delegate-at-large and one of the vice presidents of the national convention that nominated Abraham Lincoln. Upon President Abraham Lincoln's death, he was appointed by the U.S. Senate to a committee that accompanied Lincoln's body to Springfield.

=== United States Representative ===
He was a delegate to the Loyalist Convention at Philadelphia in 1866. He was elected as a Republican to the United States House of Representatives for the 39th, 40th, and 41st Congresses, serving from March 4, 1865 to March 3, 1871. He was re-elected to the U.S. House for the 42nd Congress in the general election of November 8, 1870. The Michigan Legislature subsequently elected him to the U.S. Senate on January 18, 1871, and Wilder D. Foster was elected in a special election on April 4, 1871, to fill his vacancy in the House.

On April 2, 1868, he testified in the impeachment trial of President Andrew Johnson, having been called as a witness by the prosecution.

One of Ferry's lasting legacies in the house is the clearing of the floor prior to the start of a session. On March 31, 1869, Ferry moved that the House adopt a rule which required the House Doorkeeper to clear the floor of visitors and non-privileged employees ten minutes before the start of a session. The rule was later changed to fifteen minutes.

=== United States Senator ===
Ferry was re-elected to the Senate in 1871, and served from March 4, 1871 to March 3, 1883. He was an unsuccessful candidate for reelection in 1882. Ferry was the first person from Michigan to have served in both houses of the Michigan State Legislature and in both houses of the United States Congress.

During the "Panic of 1873", economic deflation caused serious problems and Ferry became a face of the Republican inflationist movement. Congress hoped inflation would stimulate the economy and passed the Ferry Bill (introduced by Senator Ferry), which became known as the "Inflation Bill" in 1874. Many farmers and workingmen favored the bill, which would have added $64 million in greenbacks to circulation, but some Eastern bankers opposed it because it would have weakened the dollar. The bill passed the Senate and House of Representatives, but was vetoed by President Grant. An override attempt failed 34–30 in the Senate. This is one of the few bills vetoed by a member of the same party as a bills sponsor.

While senator, Ferry was chairman of the Committee on Rules and the Committee on Post Office and Post Roads (46th and 47th Congresses), as well as President pro tempore of the Senate during the 44th and 45th Congresses.

=== Acting Vice President ===
The 1877 Electoral Commission which Ferry presided over as Acting Vice President. He can be seen in the lower left of this picture

On November 22, 1875, Vice President Henry Wilson died. Ferry, being president pro tempore of the Senate, became first in the line of presidential succession, and remained so until March 3, 1877. During this time he was regarded as the acting vice president of the United States The title of "acting vice president" is not defined in the Constitution, but was widely used at the time (including by Ferry himself).

Ferry presided over the 1876 impeachment trial of William W. Belknap, the U.S. secretary of war, and the meetings of the Electoral Commission created by Congress to resolve the disputed 1876 presidential election. Still president pro tempore at that time, he would have temporally become the acting president had the Electoral College vote not been certified by March 4, 1877. Congress certified Rutherford B. Hayes as the winner of the Electoral College vote on March 2.

On July 4, 1876, the United States celebrated the 100th anniversary of the Declaration of Independence with a ceremony in Philadelphia at Independence Hall. President Grant was supposed to attend and lead the ceremony, but instead sent Ferry (as acting vice president) in his place. While Ferry was officiating, five women, headed by Susan B. Anthony, walked onto the platform and handed their "Declaration of Rights" to Ferry. As they were being taken off the stage, they threw out copies to the crowd. Anthony also read the Declaration to a large crowd and invited everyone to a National Woman Suffrage Association convention nearby.

=== 1882 election ===
Ferry's 1882 election saw national attention. Political opponent Jay Hubbell, created the "Grand Army Journal" newspaper. This libelous publication was almost universally denounced. Its sole purpose was to defame Senator Ferry. Hubbell sought to take his place in the Senate by throwing slanderous headlines in his "Journal" which he mailed out by the thousands.

Word of this fake publication took its toll on both men. Thousands of Michiganders had read this publication and, though untrue, it had tarnished Ferry's image. Hubbell was despised by many Michiganders for fabricating lies about Michigan's most powerful politician. Hubbell withdrew from the election.

Hubbell was not the only one waging war with Ferry. The Grand Rapids Times published a story labeling Ferry as unfit for office. They accused Ferry of drunkenly insulting patrons of a Washington DC Hotel. There were no first hand accounts that this took place. The Hotel proprietor, staff, and many colleagues on both sides of the aisle disputed the story and claimed Ferry did not drink and had been the perfect guest for the 12 years he had spent there.

It was said in the Chicago Inter-Ocean newspaper that, "A more malignant and unscrupulous campaign has never been conducted against any man, and whether Ferry wins or losses, the effect of this contest will be felt in Michigan for some time to come." The story continues to say, "If Michigan withdraws him and sends a new man, the State will thus surrender its standing on committees in Congress, much of its relative influence there; and what Michigan thus loses other States will gain."

After these personal attacks, Ferry could see his political life coming to an end. He withdrew from the election and advocated for the nomination of close friend Thomas Palmer. Palmer went on to replace Ferry in the Senate, much to the dismay of Ferry's political rivals.

== Later life and death ==
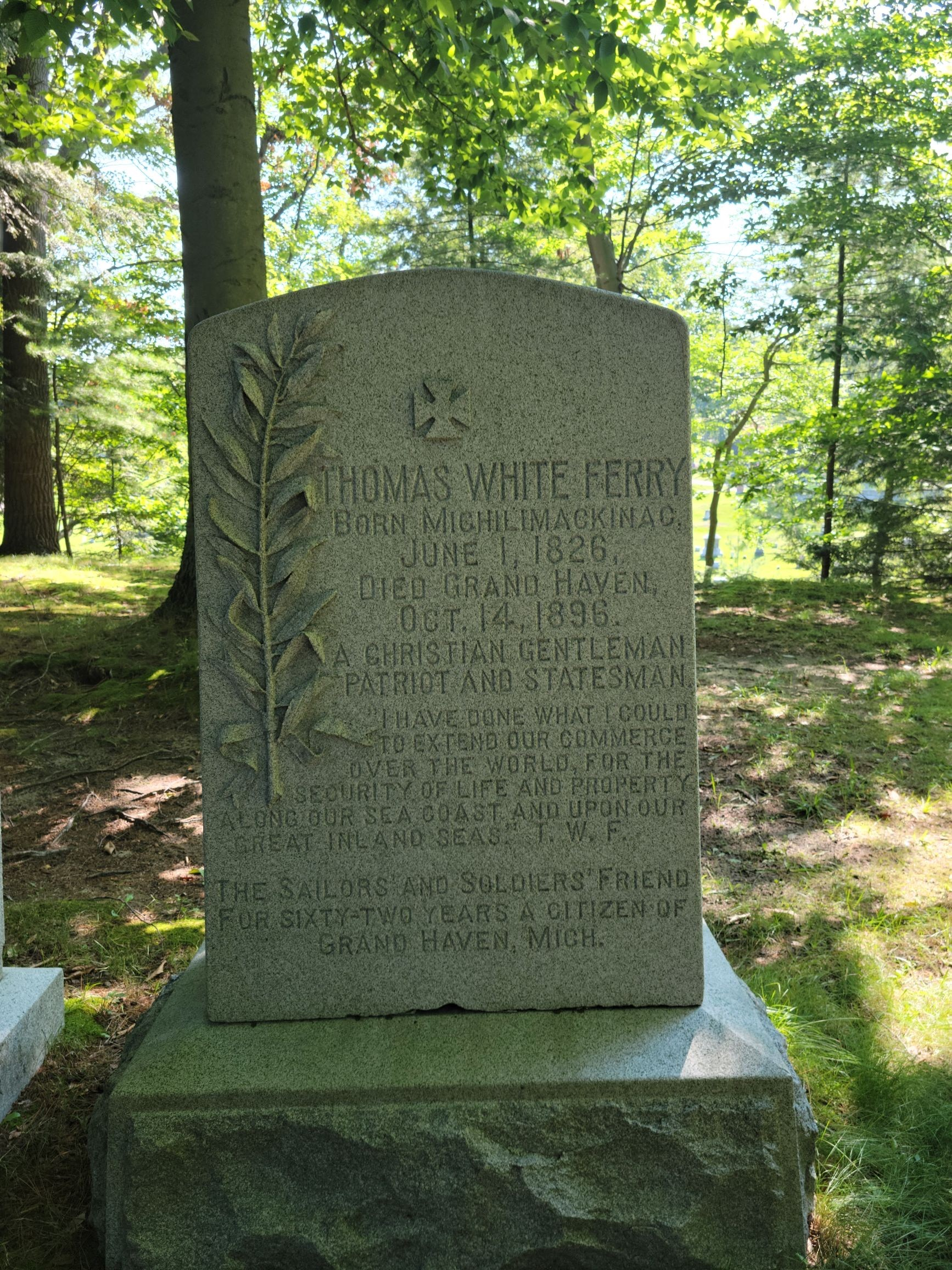
Ferry's grave

Following his political defeat, Ferry travelled in Europe for three years to recover his mental and physical health. When he returned to Grand Haven in 1886 he worked to manage his businesses and repay his debts.

Ferry had interests in mining, lumber, and iron businesses. Towards the late 1800s the west Michigan lumber Industry had dried up. This along with political foes targeting his Ottawa Iron Works business caused Ferry's companies to declare bankruptcy. Along with liquidating business assets, Ferry spent over $1,250,000 ($43,000,000 in 2025 dollars) to pay his personal debts.

Ferry never married, but was engaged on multiple occasions. Ferry was considered to be one of Washington's most eligible bachelors. He was described as being wealthy, charismatic, handsome, and powerful. One Philadelphia newspaper called him the "lady-killer" of his day who "never fails to gather a harvest of hearts during their proper season."

Once an immensely wealthy man, Ferry fell into financial disaster following his political defeat. He spent his final years hidden from the national spotlight. Ferry died in Grand Haven, Michigan, at age 69. He is interred in Grand Haven's Lake Forest Cemetery in the Ferry family plot. His epitaph reads,

"I have done what I could to extend our commerce over the world for the security of life and property along our seacoast, upon our great inland seas. T.W.F. The Sailors' and Soldiers' Friend. For 62 years a citizen of Grand Haven, Mich."

== See also ==
- Ferry Township (named after Senator Ferry)
- William Montague Ferry Jr., brother
- Noah Ferry, brother
- Edward P. Ferry, brother

== Sources ==
- Dictionary of American Biography
- Ziewacz, Lawrence E. "The Eighty-First Ballot: The Senatorial Struggle of 1883." Michigan History 56 (Fall 1972): 216–32.
- United States Congress. "Thomas W. Ferry (id: F000095)". Biographical Directory of the United States Congress.
- Thomas W. Ferry at The Political Graveyard

U.S. House of Representatives
Preceded by Francis W. Kellogg	Member of the U.S. House of Representatives from Michigan's 4th congressional district March 4, 1865 – March 3, 1871	Succeeded by Wilder D. Foster
U.S. Senate
Preceded by Jacob M. Howard	U.S. senator (Class 2) from Michigan; March 4, 1871 – March 3, 1883; Served alongside: Zachariah Chandler, Isaac P. Christiancy, Henry P. Baldwin, Omar D. Conger	Succeeded by Thomas W. Palmer
Preceded by Henry B. Anthony	President pro tempore of the United States Senate; March 9, 1875 – March 3, 1879	Succeeded by Allen G. Thurman
