= Mackinac College (Humbard) =

Bible college in Michigan, U.S.

Coordinates: 45°51′05″N 84°36′20″W

- Former name: Mackinac College (1966-1970)
- Motto: An adventure in Christian education
- Type: Private
- Active: 1972–1973
- Religious affiliation: Cathedral of Tomorrow
- Chairman: Rev. Alpha Rex Emmanuel Humbard
- President: Rev. Roger Kvam
- Vice-president: Charles W. Schoenherr
- Students: 140
- Undergraduates: 140
- Location: Mackinac Island, Michigan, United States
- Website: www.facebook.com/pages/Cathedral-of-Tomorrow/103243419728996

Mackinac College (1972–73) was a nondenominational Bible college briefly owned and operated by the Cathedral of Tomorrow at the Rex Humbard Development Center on Mission Point, Mackinac Island, Michigan. This coeducational undergraduate college was founded by Reverend Alpha Rex Emmanuel Humbard ("Brother Rex"), who was chairman of the board. The President of the college was Rev. Roger Kvam, previously an assistant professor of political science at the University of Akron.

== Facilities ==
Brother Rex purchased his Development Center property from Mackinac College (1966-1970). This earlier college had been a non-sectarian, co-educational four-year liberal arts college that closed due to financial problems after the graduation of its Charter Class in 1970. Buildings at the 21-acre (8.5 ha) Mission Point (Mackinac Island) campus included residence halls, laboratories, classrooms, a conference center, a library, theater, studio, kitchens, and dining halls, and the historic Mission House. The Development Center also included the 190-acre Stonecliffe estate. Stonecliffe had a 1904 mansion, entertainment hall and stage, bowling alley, and downhill ski slope. As owner of Mission Point and Stonecliffe, Rev. Humbard was the largest private landowner on Mackinac Island.

== Board of trustees ==
List of Trustees Board

Rev. Rex E. Humbard	Chairman
Rev. Roger A. Kvam	President
Maude Aimee Humbard	Vice Chairman
Ellis Baird	Vice Chairman, Treasurer
Dan E. Stephens	Secretary
Rev. Rex E. Humbard	Asst. Secretary
Rev. C. Wayne Jones	
William S. Parry	

== Students and academics ==
In fall 1972, Humbard opened his Mackinac College to 140 students who were hoping to study in a Christian environment and maybe go skiing. Courses were offered in humanities, physical sciences, and social sciences, divided into eighteen departments.

== Finances and development ==
The Cathedral of Tomorrow's acquisition of properties on Mackinac Island in April 1971 was part of an expanded growth push by Rex Humbard. Humbard's twin goals had been to open a revitalized Mackinac College and to develop Stonecliffe as a Christian retreat and winter ski resort. The Mission Point campus and Stonecliffe were valued at $17,000,000, offered for sale at $3,000,000, and purchased by Humbard for $2.2 million. During its operation, the college loaned $450,000 to the resort to build a golf course; this money was never repaid. The college also paid $1.6 million to the Cathedral of Tomorrow TV program to promote the college. Furthermore, the college paid $400,000 in commissions to individuals who helped the college raise money.

In the fall of 1971, Humbard had bulldozers go to work on Mackinac Island's far West Bluff at Stonecliffe to clear old-growth cedar for downhill ski slopes. Humbard regularly flew from Akron, OH to Mackinac Island to inspect the work. In early 1972, the work at Stonecliffe continued as an 838 ft. double chairlift was installed. Humbard's expenses immediately mounted, however, as he also began building a tower in Cuyahoga Falls, OH (now part of Ernest Angely's Grace Cathedral), purchased a 23-story office building, and acquired his third private plane (a Lockheed Electra turboprop).

In the winter of 1972 the bluff proved unsuitable for downhill skiing. Then in June 1973—due to financial problems and lawsuits filed by the Ohio Department of Commerce and the U.S. Securities and Exchange Commission—Mackinac College at the Rex Humbard Development Center sold off much of the college's furnishings and closed.

== After 1973 ==
In 1973 creditors reorganized the Mission Point campus as a summer resort complex. In 1977, Humbard sold it for $1.3 million to the Loewi Realty Company, Milwaukee, in association with Jeff DeGayner of Arlington Heights, Ill. The name was changed to Mackinac Hotel and Conference Center. In 1987 John Shufelt purchased and restored the campus, which is now Mission Point Resort. It has since been purchased by Dennert O. and Suzanne Ware. In the mid-1970s, Stonecliffe was purchased by entrepreneur George Staffan, who ran it as an Inn until 2000. The chairlift was taken down and moved to a ski resort in Massachusetts. The Robert Pulte family finally purchased Stonecliffe and they continue to run the Inn, having added many amenities to the property,

== See also ==
- Mackinac College, a private liberal arts college that operated in 1966-1970
