= Willamette Writers =

Willamette Writers is a 501-c-3 nonprofit writing group based in the U.S. state of Oregon, with nearly 1,600 members, and chapters in Portland, Eugene, Salem, Corvallis, Central Point, and Newport. The group has a house (The Willamette Writers Cynthia Whitcomb House for writers) in West Linn that serves as an office, and a place for meetings, critique groups and workshops. Additionally it has rooms that members can rent to write in.

Willamette Writers aims to provide and encourage a creative environment and support system for current and aspiring writers. Since beginning in 1965, Willamette Writers has provided meeting places for the exchange of ideas and information and has initiated programs designed to help writers increase skills related to the craft of writing. Each chapter has monthly meetings during most of the year with speakers, workshops, and more. Members receive a monthly newsletter, "The Willamette Writer," containing news from the organization, writing tips and other information for writers.

== Programs ==
- Books for Kids program annually collects over 20,000 new and used books to distribute to local shelters, schools, and organizations.
- Young Willamette Writers offers opportunities for students in grades 5–10 to have a critique group and learn from local writers.
- "Annual Conference" is held every year the first weekend in August. The conference features classes, networking, FiLMLaB contest, and has agents, editors, film managers and producers to take pitches.
- "Workshops" are offered at the West Lynn House and other venues throughout the year.
- "FiLMLab" is a film script contest that results in the production of a short film for the winner.
- "The Authors Road" is a semi-independent project done through Willamette Writers. It consists of a website featuring audio/video interviews with notable American authors done throughout the United States and tales from the road. Its aim is to honor writers and provide information and advice to writers and readers.

== Contests, Scholarships & Awards ==
- Kate Herzog Writing Scholarships are offered to high school seniors and college freshman and sophomores annually.
- "Whitcomb Conference Scholarships" are awarded to high school and college students and their teachers.
- The "Kay Snow Writing Contest" (named for Willamette Writers' founder) is held every spring to encourage writers, particularly those starting out.
- "Annual Awards" are presented each year to recognize outstanding Northwest writers at various stages in their careers: Lifetime Achievement, Distinguished NW Writer, Up & Coming, and Humanitarian awards are presented at an awards banquet held during the August conference.

== See also ==
- Michael Henderson
