= Michael Henderson (author) =

English journalist (1932–2022)

Michael Henderson (15 March 1932 – 6 May 2022) was an English journalist and the author of 14 books. No Enemy To Conquer – Forgiveness in An Unforgiving World (2009) had a foreword by the Dalai Lama. The former BBC war correspondent Martin Bell described the book as "a thoughtful guidebook to the troubled times we live in". Henderson's books on forgiveness are regularly used in academic courses on conflict resolution. He lived in Westward Ho! in North Devon, England, and Taunton, Somerset, from 2018.

== Life and career ==
Henderson was born in Ealing, London on 15 March 1932. Due to evacuation he attended many schools: Durston House and Ripley Court in Britain, Milton Academy Junior School and Rectory School in the United States, and The Hall School and Mill Hill School after he returned to England.

From 1979 to 2000 he and his wife Erica (nee Hallowes) lived in Portland, Oregon where he was president of the World Affairs Council, the English-Speaking Union and Willamette Writers.

In the US he was a columnist for The Oregonian and The Christian Science Monitor and Union Jack and contributed op-ed articles to many papers including the Los Angeles Times, the St. Louis Post-Dispatch, the Milwaukee Journal, The Plain Dealer and the Washington Times.

He was a London correspondent for the Religion News Service, the West Indian Digest and Himmat and had articles published in dozens of papers around the world including the Jamaican Sunday Gleaner, the Japanese Mainichi Daily News, Hong Kong’s South China Morning Post, Canada’s Calgary Herald, and the Nigeria's The Guardian.

His books include All Her Paths Are Peace – Women Pioneers in Peacemaking (1994), The Forgiveness Factor- Stories of Hope in a World of Conflict and Forgiveness: Breaking the Chain of Hate (2002). His book Experiment with Untruth: India under Emergency (1978) was an expose of Prime Minister Indira Gandhi's Emergency period of dictatorship and censorship.

He is also the author of the autobiographical See You After the Duration – the Story of British Evacuees to North America in World War II (2014). He and his brother, Gerald, spent five years at that time in the United States. A practising Anglican, and a supporter of the secular Forgiveness Project, he had a respectful regard for people of other faith and beliefs. "Forgiveness," he said, is one of the few concepts which, like love, are respected and encouraged by all the world's religions."

He was for 35 years on the British Council of The Oxford Group and 20 years on the American board of Moral Re-Armament, now both known as Initiatives of Change and worked in more than twenty countries in the last 50 years.

Following the onset of Alzheimer's disease, he died in a care home in Rochdale, Lancashire, on 6 May 2022, at the age of 90. He was survived by Erica, their daughter Juliet, daughter-in-law, Stephanie Thomas, and two granddaughters.
