= Mackinac College =

Private liberal arts college

Coordinates: 45°51′05″N 84°36′20″W

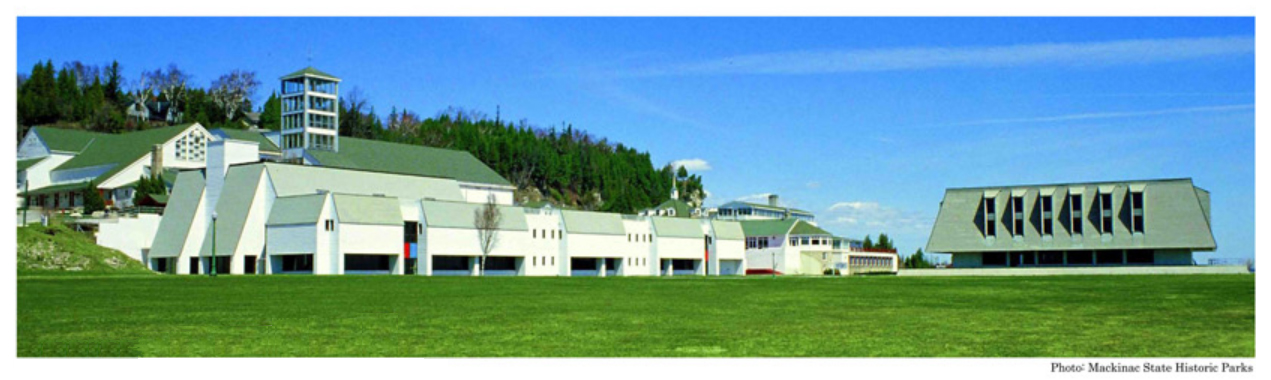
- The Clark Center for Arts and Sciences (left) and Peter Howard Memorial Library (right) were constructed for use by Mackinac College.
- Motto: To learn how to learn, to live, and to lead.
- Type: Private
- Active: 1966–1970
- President: Samuel Douglas Cornell, Ph.D. (1965–1970)
- Academic staff: 36
- Administrative staff: 25
- Undergraduates: 350
- Location: Mackinac Island, Michigan, United States
- Colors: red and blue

Mackinac College was a private liberal arts college which opened on Mackinac Island, Michigan, in the fall of 1966 and closed four years later in 1970. The college taught courses in biology, chemistry, physics, psychology, modern languages, theater, television, radio, journalism, art, government, and public affairs. The college offered professional degrees.

== Beginnings ==
In 1964, journalist Peter Howard of the Moral Re-Armament (MRA) movement proposed the idea of converting the MRA camp at Mackinac Island, which stood unused for a large portion of the year, into a college campus. His proposal was to create a high-level school institution to educate young adults for the 21st century to play key roles in international relations, modern languages, theater, television, radio, journalism, art, government, and public affairs. The college planned to offer professional degrees in these fields. The school was granted a charter from the state of Michigan in 1965.

The MRA deeded its headquarters on the island and the Old Mission House to Mackinac College. The first class was admitted in 1966, due to graduate in 1970, consisted of 113 students from 30 states and Canada. The charter class of freshmen students were put in temporary classroom facilities on September 15 in the new Peter Howard Memorial Library building on the beach at Cedar Point until the college facilities were finished. Optical physicist Samuel Douglas Cornell resigned from his 12-year position as an executive manager of the National Academy of Sciences to become the school's president.

A gift of $1,500,000 (equivalent to $10,000,000 in 2025) from a Mr and Mrs William Van Alan Clark of New York City for construction and equipping of the main classroom-laboratory building of Mackinac College was announced by the board trustees in the first week of May 1966. It was for a 75,000-square-foot (7,000 m^{2}), two-story, reinforced concrete structure. It had completion scheduled for August 1967. The donor was an honorary chairman of the board of Avon Products. The donor and his wife had discussed the need for an academic center with Cornell on several occasions. The concept evolved of a science center being integrated with the college's existing fine arts facility. The new center housed 20 classrooms, 13 seminar study areas, a lecture hall capable of seating 300, faculty offices, and laboratories for biology, chemistry, physics, psychology, and languages. The new arts and science center, designed by a well-known architectural firm of Little Rock, Arkansas, was planned to harmonize with the existing college buildings and with the surrounding wooded lake shore area where the campus was.

== Operations ==
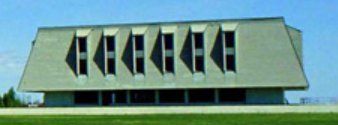
Peter Howard Memorial Library

During its operations, Mackinac College had a liberal arts focus (unlike the MRA's College of the Good Road which focused on teaching ideology of the MRA), and joined in with the "radical critique of traditional higher education" which was happening in the 1960s, although the MRA was generally strongly opposed to most of the ideals of the 1960s counter culture. Students participated in the creation of the curriculum, but were not allowed to date which caused discord and unrest with some clandestine activity.

The college held its first and final commencement exercises of 29 seniors receiving Bachelor of Arts degrees on June 20, 1970. The exercises were held in the Great Hall of the college that was preceded by the traditional academic procession that included some 20 members of the present and past faculties. All former faculty members of the college were invited to take part in the commencement ceremony. Cornell directed the exercises, which began with a message of greeting from the chairman of the board of trustees, Basil Entwistle. The students chose not to have the regular commencement address and instead some of the students spoke briefly during the exercises.

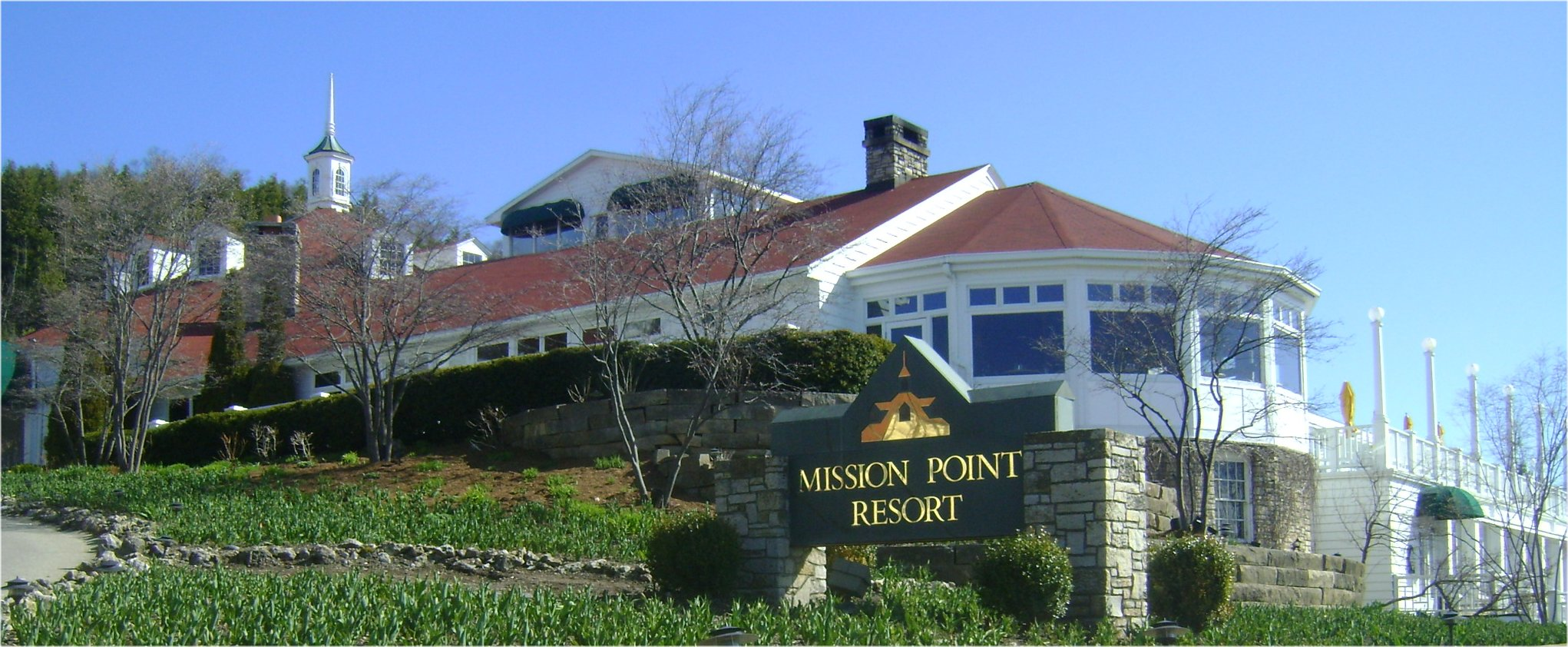
Mission Point Resort

== Closing and legacy ==
The school closed at the end of June 1970, four years after opening. The American School Board Journal cited the reasons for the closure as being "familiar": the high costs of setting up the campus and programs, a smaller enrollment than planned and a lack of alumni to fund endowments. After closing, the campus was sold to Cathedral of Tomorrow, founded by Rex Humbard who reopened Mackinac College in 1972 as a bible college under the same name. The campus was sold in 1977 to a Dallas-based real estate development firm which transformed it into the Mackinac Hotel & Conference Center. The property was again sold in 1987 and redeveloped into the Mission Point Resort, with the Howard Library being torn down a few years later.

== Sources ==
- Bruce, William George (1970). The American School Board Journal. National School Boards Association.
- North, Tom (2011). Mackinac Island. Arcadia Publishing. ISBN 9780738584492.
- Sack, Daniel (2009). Moral Re-Armament. Palgrave Macmillan. ISBN 9780312293277.
- Adie, Madeline Okerman (2012). The Straits of Mackinac. Arcadia Publishing. ISBN 9780738591896.
- Porter, Phil (1998). Mackinac: an island famous in these regions. Mackinac State Historic Parks. ISBN 9780911872699.
