= The Authors Road =

The Authors Road is a non-commercial archive and documentary research project that explores the art of writing through interviews with American authors and experts.

Their goal is to provide a repository or library of multi-media information about American writers in a way that honors writers and their craft, shares insights into the art of writing, and introduces the people behind the stories that are the basis to books, movies, plays, newspapers, magazines and poetry journals. This ongoing archive can be used by schools, universities, writers, researchers, and of course readers who wish to learn more about their favorite writer. In addition, writers, writers organizations, and museums representing writers use the materials to help promote better understanding and insight on writing.

== Background ==
Begun in 2011 under the auspices of Willamette Writers, its principals, George Mason and Salli Slaughter have thus far traveled through 20 states meeting and interviewing major published American writers and experts on dead writers. The video and audio interviews are shared on a non-commercial website, AuthorsRoad.com that also includes information about the writer, as well as travel stories and photos.

George and Salli drive a truck they named Rocinante Tres, after the horse of Don Quixote and John Steinbeck’s camper-truck used while writing Travels with Charley. Rocinante Tres hauls a fifth-wheel trailer they named Hardscribble Hacienda after writer Hugh Mulligan’s home, Hardscribble House.

The trip began travelling from Oregon, to California and Arizona (with an extended stay in Patagonia). By the summer of 2014 The Authors Road had driven more than 40,000 miles through 20 states, interviewed 45 people, given more than a dozen free presentations in libraries, schools, bookstores and civic groups, and appeared in dozens of media interviews and articles.

== Principals ==
George Mason grew up in the San Francisco Bay Area, and is a graduate of San Francisco State University. He’s worked as a teacher, public relations counselor, and writer.

Salli Slaughter was raised in the Phoenix, Arizona area, and is a graduate of Arizona State University. She’s worked as web and publication designer, public affairs specialist, researcher, and book expert.

== Interviews ==
- Jo Harvey Allen, Playwright
- Terry Allen, Songwriter, Artist
- Jean M. Auel, Novelist - Historical Fiction
- Cara Black, Novelist – Mystery
- Michael Blake, Screenwriter, Novelist
- Lois McMaster Bujold, Science Fiction, Fantasy
- Phillip Caputo, Nonfiction, Novels, Journalist
- Laura Chester, Editor, Writer
- Karen Cushman, Middle Grade, Young Adult
- Carola Dunn, Mystery, Romance
- Robert Dugoni, Legal Thrillers
- Larry Engelmann, Creative Nonfiction
- Jim Fergus, Novelist
- Diana Gabaldon, Novelist
- Jim Harrison, Poet, Novelist, Screenwriter, Essayist
- Juanita Havill, Children's’, Middle Grade, Poet
- Ernest Hemingway, Novelist (deceased)
- Anne Hillerman, Novelist, Nonfiction and Tony Hillerman, Novelist (deceased)
- Pam Houston, Novelist
- Lawson Inada, Poet, Oregon’s 5th Poet Laureate
- Laurie R. King, Mystery.
- Sinclair Lewis, Novelist (deceased).
- Jack London, Novelist, Short Story (deceased)
- George R.R. Martin, Novelist, Screenwriter – Fantasy.
- Tom McGuane, Novelist, Screenwriter, Essayist.
- Haki Madhubuti, Publisher, Poet, Essayist, Writer.
- R.C. Matherson, Screenwriter, Short Story, Horror, Science Fiction.
- Alejandro Murgia, Poet, Short Story.
- Audrey Niffenegger, Novelist, Graphic Novelist, Artist
- Verlana Orr, Poetry
- Paulann Petersen, Poetry. Oregon Poet Laureate.
- David Quammen, Creative Nonfiction – Science.
- Mary Roach, Creative Nonfiction – Science.
- Tom Robbins, Novelist.
- John Steinbeck, Novelist, Screenwriter (deceased) - instead met a volunteer at the National Steinbeck Center
- Dennis Stovall, Publisher, Writer.
- Gail Tsukiyama, Novelist, Poet.
- Frederick Turner, Nonfiction, Fiction.
- Mark Twain, Novelist (deceased)
- Cynthia Whitcomb, Screenwriter, Playwright.
- Daniel H. Wilson, Robotic Science Fiction, Novelist
- Patricia C, Wrede, YA Fantasy.
