= Moral Re-Armament =

Organization

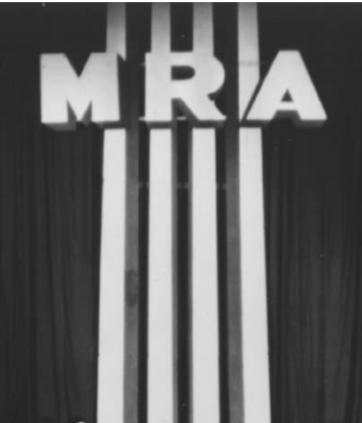
- Moral Re-Armament emblem used as the background decor for the MRA Launch in the U.S.
- Successor: Initiatives of Change
- Founded: 1938
- Dissolved: 2001
- Key people: Frank Buchman, Peter Howard

Moral Re-Armament (MRA) was an international moral and spiritual movement that, in 1938, developed from American minister Frank Buchman's Oxford Group. Buchman headed MRA for 23 years until his death in 1961. In 2001, the movement was renamed Initiatives of Change.

== History ==
=== Beginning ===
In 1922, Frank Buchman left his teaching position at the Hartford Seminary Foundation to pursue a ministry focused on individual spiritual transformation and global evangelism. His tenets focused on the 'Four Absolutes' which were absolute honesty, absolute purity, absolute unselfishness, and absolute love. This approach emphasized divine guidance, adherence to moral principles, and personal interaction as catalysts for change.

Buchman relocated his activities to Princeton University, where student discussions he organized included public confessions of sexual activities. The discussions generated controversy, resulting in university president John Hibben banning Buchman from campus. He subsequently gained support at the University of Oxford in England, where the movement became known as the Oxford Group. The Oxford Group held increasingly popular conferences across multiple countries, attracting thousands of participants. These gatherings served as platforms to disseminate the group's philosophy.

The Oxford Groupers or Buchmanites were rebranded in 1938 when Buchman launched Moral Re-Armament. "The crisis is fundamentally a moral one," he said. "The nations must re-arm morally. Moral recovery is essentially the forerunner of economic recovery. Moral recovery creates not crisis but confidence and unity in every phase of life."

The phrase caught the mood of the time, and many public figures in Britain and abroad spoke and wrote in support, including ex-prime minister Stanley Baldwin, former US president Herbert Hoover, novelist Daphne du Maurier, Queen Wilhelmina of the Netherlands and King Leopold III of Belgium. British tennis star H. W. Austin edited the book Moral Rearmament (The Battle for Peace), which sold half a million copies. In 1940, Daphne du Maurier, who despite her ambivalence about religion became attracted through Austin's influence to the movement's ideal of "unselfishness", published Come Wind, Come Weather, eleven "inspirational" tales of ordinary Britons who had found hope and new life through MRA. The booklet sold 650,000 copies in Britain alone (all 340,000 copies of the initial printing sold in two months during the Battle of Britain) and around one million copies are estimated to have been in circulation worldwide. Du Maurier dedicated it to "Frank Buchman, whose initial vision made possible the world of the living characters in these stories." She continued to campaign for MRA on radio broadcasts sent to America in 1941.

In June 1939, a national meeting for the launch of MRA in the United States was held at the Constitution Hall in Washington, D.C. Its sponsors included Senator (later President) Harry Truman, Henry Ford, the mayor of New York City Fiorello La Guardia, Theodore Roosevelt Jr., Henry Morgenthau Sr., governor of New York Herbert H. Lehman, ex-governor of New York Al Smith, president of New York University Harry Woodburn Chase, soon-to-be Secretary of War Henry L. Stimson, and five members of President Franklin D. Roosevelt's cabinet. The meeting received statements of support from ex-president Herbert Hoover, Secretary of State Cordell Hull, General John J. Pershing, French eugenicist Alexis Carrel, premier of New South Wales Bertram Stevens, future prime minister of South Africa D. F. Malan, the wife of the Dutch prime minister Hendrikus Colijn, and the parliamentary speakers from Bulgaria (Stoycho Moshanov), Estonia (Mihkel Pung), Norway (C. J. Hambro) and Switzerland (Henry Vallotton).

=== World War II ===
When World War II started, many of those active in the campaign for Moral Re-Armament joined the Allied forces. MRA did try unsuccessfully to obtain exemptions from military service for its members.

When MRA was established in the United States in 1941, it was considered by some to be an effective way to combat communism. Senator Harry Truman, Chairman of the Senate's Truman Committee investigating war contracts, told a Washington press conference in 1943: "Suspicions, rivalries, apathy, greed lie behind most of the bottlenecks. This is where the Moral Re-Armament group comes in. Where others have stood back and criticized, they have rolled up their sleeves and gone to work." Truman supported the work of the MRA throughout the war, with his longtime aid, John R. Steelman, stating the MRA "as the greatest single force in the nation for reconciliation." Truman supported the MRA-produced play "The Forgotten Factor", calling it "the most important play produced by the war."

Buchman and the MRA faced criticism for Buchman's pro-Nazism and antisemitic statement, "I thank heaven for a man like Adolf Hitler, who built a front-line of defense against the anti-Christ of Communism. My barber in London told me Hitler saved all Europe from Communism. That’s how he felt. Of course, I don’t condone everything the Nazis do. Anti-Semitism? Bad, naturally. I suppose Hitler sees a Karl Marx in every Jew." He continued, "But think what it would mean to the world if Hitler surrendered to God. Or Mussolini. Or any dictator. Through such a man God could control a nation overnight and solve every last, bewildering problem." The quote caused the MRA to have problems recruiting members.

Buchman also supported a theocratic fascist state to defeat communism, "Spain has taught us what godless Communism will bring. Human problems aren’t economic. They’re moral, and they can’t be solved by immoral measures. They could be solved within a God-controlled democracy, or perhaps I should say a theocracy, and they could be solved through a God-controlled Fascist dictatorship."

=== Post-war ===
When the war concluded, the MRA continued their mission on anti-communism and fighting moral evils in conjunction with their theological beliefs.

In 1946, 50 Swiss families active in the work of MRA bought and restored a large, derelict hotel at Caux, Switzerland. This became a centre of European reconciliation, attended by thousands in the following years, including German Chancellor Konrad Adenauer and French Foreign Minister Robert Schuman. Buchman was awarded the Croix de Chevalier of the Légion d'honneur by the French Government, and also the German Grand Cross of the Order of Merit. The historians Douglas Johnston and Cynthia Sampson described the work as an "important contribution to one of the greatest achievements in the entire record of modern statecraft: the astonishingly rapid Franco-German reconciliation after 1945."

In Britain, hundreds donated money for the purchase of the Westminster Theatre in London, as a living memorial to the men and women of Moral Re-Armament who had died in war service. Many servicemen gave their gratuities. For the next 50 years, the theatre presented a host of plays and musicals. The theatre was successful, but the plays were biased toward the MRA's societal beliefs, which struggled to stay relevant through the decades.

In France, the well-known existentialist Catholic philosopher Gabriel Marcel edited a book, Un Changement d'Espérance à la Rencontre du Réarmament Moral, which brings together the stories of a French socialist leader, a Brazilian docker, an African chief, a Buddhist abbot, a Canadian industrialist, and many others who found a new approach through MRA. The English edition, published by Longman, was titled Fresh Hope for the World.

MRA began holding conferences on Mackinac Island, Michigan, in 1942, first at The Island House, rehabilitating it and much of the nearby grounds. They then purchased the abandoned Mission House hotel and adjacent property on the island's east end. The lease was temporarily blocked by the Michigan Attorney General office, causing greater scrutiny of the organization before the deal was eventually passed. Between 1954 and 1960, they constructed an extensive training center there, including a theatre and a soundstage. The soundstage was used for the production of motion pictures, including The Crowning Experience, Voice of the Hurricane, and Decision at Midnight. In 1966, MRA deeded much of the property on the island to Mackinac College. The property later became Mission Point Resort, a summer resort hotel.

=== Global spread ===
In the 1950s and 1960s, MRA's work expanded across the globe. Buchman was a pioneer in multi-faith initiatives. As he said, "MRA is the good road of an ideology inspired by God upon which all can unite. Catholic, Jew and Protestant, Hindu, Muslim, Buddhist and Confucianist – all find they can change, where needed, and they can travel along this good road together."

Australian Labor Party politician Kim Beazley Sr., member of the Australian Parliament from 1945 until 1975, became a staunch member of Moral Re-Armament, declaring his intention "to turn the searchlight of absolute honesty on to my motives". In 1971, he took two Yolngu (Indigenous Australian) men, Galarrwuy Yunupingu and Wulanybuma Wununggumurra (the latter a signatory to the Yirrkala bark petitions), to the MRA conference in Caux. He continued to champion the cause of MRA until his death in 2007.

These ideas appealed to many in African and Asian countries, which were then moving towards independence from colonial rule. Leaders of these independence struggles have paid tribute to MRA for helping to bring about unity between groups in conflict, and for helping to ease the transition to independence. In 1956, King Mohammed V of Morocco sent a message to Buchman: "I thank you for all you have done for Morocco in the course of these last testing years. Moral Re-Armament must become for us Muslims as much an incentive as it is for you Christians and for all nations."

In 1960, Archbishop Makarios and Fazıl Küçük, President and vice-president of Cyprus, sent the first flag of Cyprus to Buchman, at Caux, in recognition of MRA's help in gaining the country independence.

=== Initiatives of Change ===
In 2001, the MRA movement changed its name to Initiatives of Change (IofC).

=== Criticism ===
Buchman and the MRA faced criticism for his views on Hitler, Nazism, and fascism.

In 1951, the Catholic Church ordered its members not to join the MRA because it supported the heresy of illuminism. The organization was criticized by Radio Moscow Overseas Service for its anticommunist ideals, in November 1952 saying, "Moral Re-Armament supplants the inevitable class war by the 'permanent struggle between good and evil'," and "has the power to attract radical revolutionary minds."

The MRA has been described as an "ineffective cult" with absolutes that were naïve, impossible to fulfill, and overly dependent on personal revelations. Actress Glenn Close, whose parents were part of the movement, publicly called the organization a cult.

== In the media ==
The group is also mentioned in Raymond Chandler's book Farewell, My Lovely. A cop says to Philip Marlowe: "I think we gotta make this little world all over again. Now take Moral Rearmament. There you've got something. M. R. A. There you've got something, baby."

In the music video for Smile Empty Soul's 2003 single "Bottom of The Bottle," lead singer Sean Danielsen is seen wearing a T-shirt with the slogan "And God said unto thee, MRA."

In the 2006 Sue Grafton novel S is for Silence, one of the points of contention between two main characters is adherence to the principles of Moral Re-Armament. “I was the Moral Re-Armament princess,” Kathy says, reflecting on her teen years.

== See also ==
- Up with People
- Michael Henderson (author)
