= Mission Point Resort =

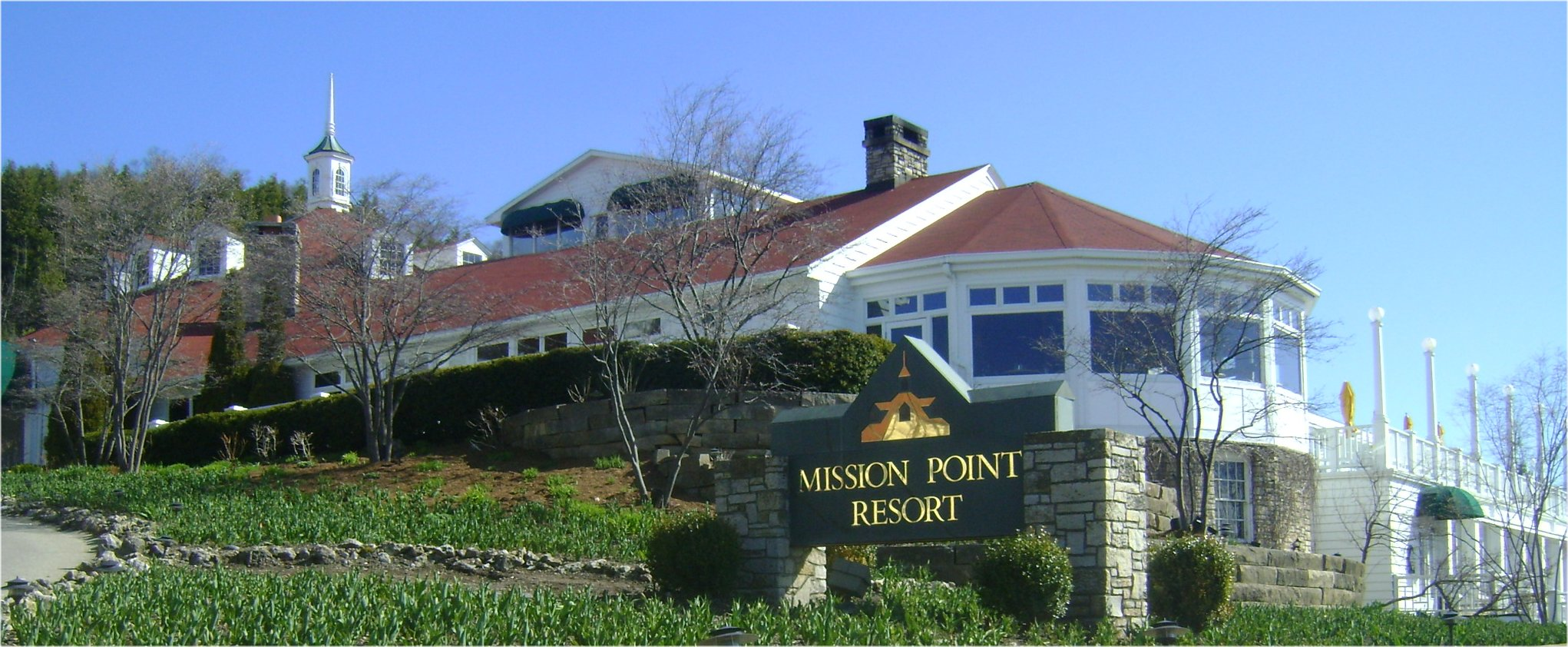
- Interactive map of the Mission Point Resort area

General information
- Architectural style: Adirondack
- Location: 6633 Main Street, Mackinac Island, Michigan, United States
- Coordinates: 45°51′5″N 84°36′19.5″W
- Construction started: 1954
- Completed: 1958

Other information
- Number of rooms: 239
- Number of restaurants: 4
- Number of bars: 1

Website
- http://www.missionpoint.com

Mission Point Resort is a summer resort hotel located on Mackinac Island, an island in the Straits of Mackinac between the US state of Michigan's Upper and Lower peninsulas. It is located on the southeastern shoreline of the island, also called Mission Point.

== History ==
The earliest buildings of Mission Point Resort originated from Moral Re-Armament concepts between Michigan governor G. Mennen Williams and Dr Frank Buchman in the 1950s. Since then, the resort buildings had transformed to Mackinac College in 1966, and then became a religious retreat and educational institution in 1970. In 1972 the buildings had transitioned into a vacation resort property and were eventually renamed Mission Point Resort in 1987.

== In popular culture ==
Some Mission Point properties, such as the theater, sound stage, and one of the classrooms, served as filming locations for the 1980 film Somewhere in Time starring Christopher Reeve and Jane Seymour.

The resort was featured on the Syfy cable television series Ghost Hunters in the sixth episode of season seven, originally airing on March 30, 2011. Named "Frozen in Fear", the episode wrapped up filming on the last available day of ferry transportation to the island due to the encroaching winter ice.

== See also ==
Mission Point (Mackinac Island), the area of the island on which the resort was built
