= East Moran Bay =

Historic Michigan harbor

- Location within Michigan
- Location: Mackinac County, Michigan
- Coordinates: 45.872°N 84.726°W
- Type: Bay
- Surface elevation: 581 ft (177 m)

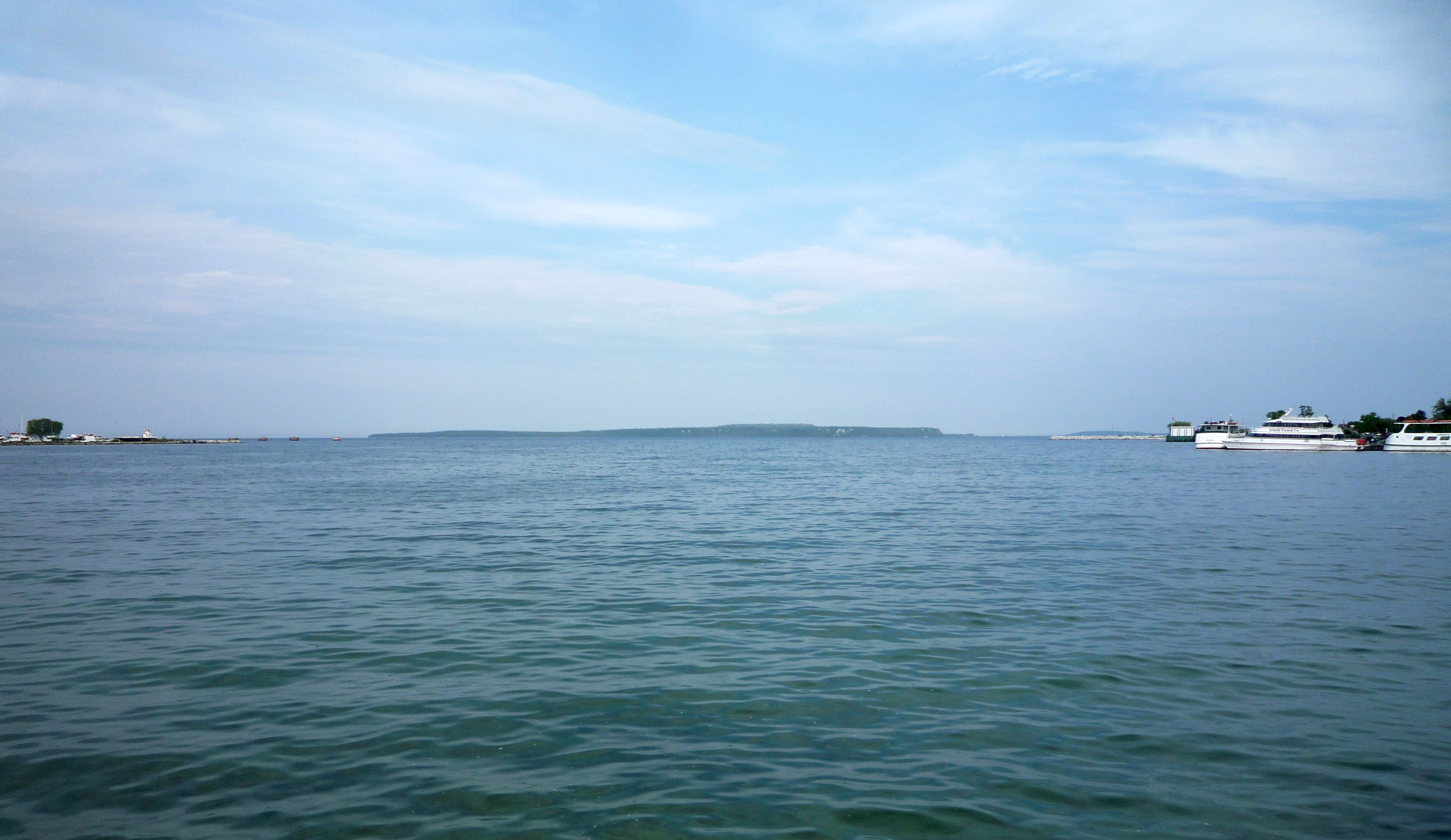
The northeast and southeast points of East Moran Bay, framing Mackinac Island

East Moran Bay is a small, historic harbor in the Straits of Mackinac adjacent to the city of St. Ignace in the U.S. state of Michigan. The bay and its harbor are guarded by the Wawatam Lighthouse.

The bay is a traditional place for fishing, and several St. Ignace archaeological sites associated with Native American history are located adjacent to the bay. In historical times, the bay was used as a harbor by the Mackinac Transportation Company, operator of train ferries; the Vacationland and her sister vessels, which crossed the Straits carrying motor vehicles. As of 2025, the bay is used by the Arnold Transit Company and by Shepler's Ferry passenger boat lines to Mackinac Island, a tourist center of the Straits of Mackinac.

State historical markers describe the history of the harbor. A bottomland survey of East Moran Bay was performed by the Michigan Underwater Preserve Council and its volunteer sport divers in the early 1900s and published by the United States Government Printing Office in 1992. The city of St. Ignace has built and maintains an East Moran Bay waterfront path, the Huron Boardwalk, marked with signs and artifacts, to interpret and celebrate the bay and its heritage. The artifacts include the remains of a Mackinaw boat built about 1899.
