= Mishe Mokwa =

Mishe Mokwa may refer to:

- Misha Mokwa, Wisconsin, an unincorporated community
- Mishe Mokwa Trail, a trail in Santa Monica Mountains National Recreation Area, California
- Mishe Mokwa Creek, a waterway impounded by the Sherwood Dam in California
- Mishe-Mokwa, a passenger ferry on Lake Michigan, Michigan
- Mishe-Mokwa, a mythical bear in the epic poem The Song of Hiawatha
