= Wawatam Lighthouse =

Lighthouse in Michigan, United States

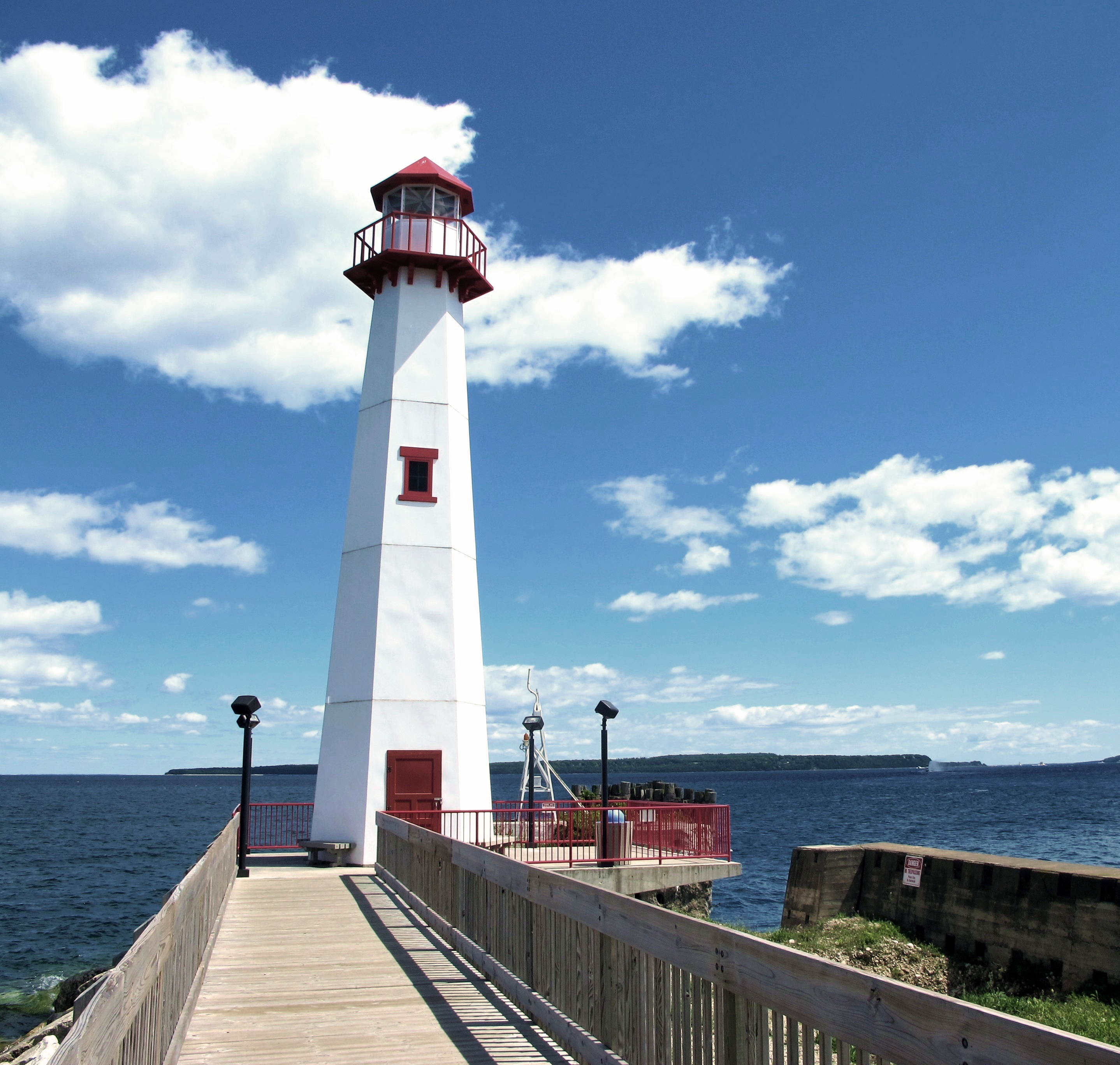
- Wawatam Lighthouse in 2010
- Location: St. Ignace, Mackinac County, United States
- Coordinates: 45°52′N 84°43′W

Tower
- Constructed: 1998
- Height: 52 ft (16 m)
- Shape: hexagon
- Markings: White (tower), red (trim)

Light
- First lit: 2006
- Focal height: 62 ft (19 m)
- Lens: Fresnel lens
- Range: 13 mi (21 km)
- Characteristic: Fl W 5s

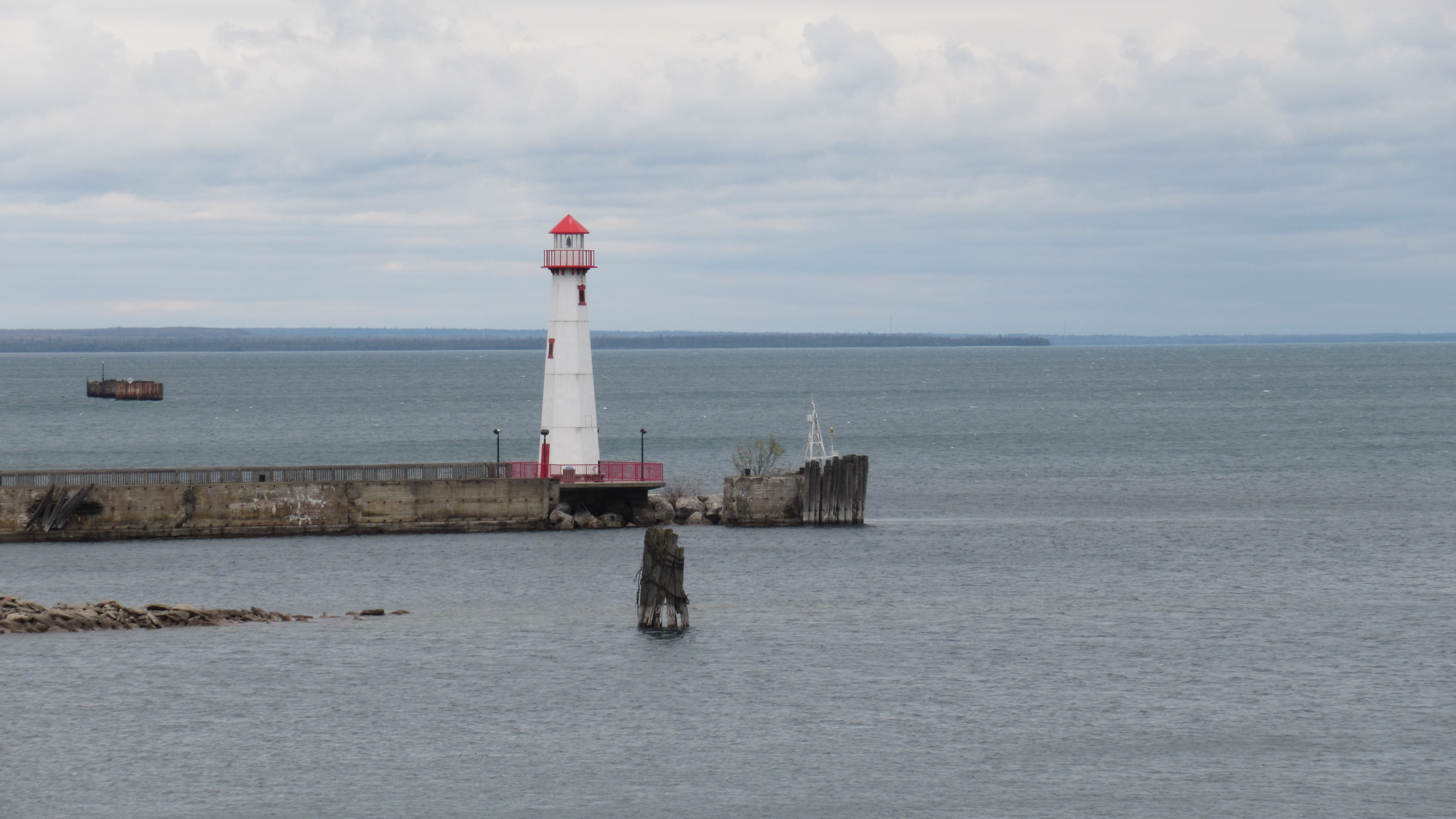
Wawatam Lighthouse in 2022

Wawatam Lighthouse is an automated, modern lighthouse that guards the harbor of St. Ignace, Michigan, in the Straits of Mackinac. (Note: The Coast Guard rates "it as 62 feet tall from the water to the focal plane (the beacon).") Originally completely nonfunctional, it was erected in 1998 by the Michigan Department of Transportation (MDOT) near Monroe, Michigan as a roadside attraction at a welcome center that greeted northbound drivers on Interstate 75 (I-75). After serving in this capacity for six years, the structure was threatened in 2004 when MDOT decided to rebuild the welcome center and demolish the tower.

Demolition was averted when the St. Ignace civic leaders for the Straits of Mackinac municipality, which had never had a light tower, heard of the opportunity and asked that the welded steel tower be given to them, this time for use in real life. Over a two-year period, the redundant structure was cut apart, trucked to St. Ignace, and re-erected, this time as a functional aid to navigation with a working light. The "new" lighthouse was re-lighted in St. Ignace in August 2006. As of 2025, it is one of the final working light towers to be erected in the waters of the United States.

== History ==
The lighthouse was originally built by MDOT in 1998 as an architectural folly at the Monroe welcome center on I-75 near Monroe, Michigan, in the southeastern corner of the state near the Ohio border. It was a lighthouse structure that was constructed far away from navigational waters as an element of the tourist heritage of the state. (Note: "I thought it a little strange when the state erected the 52-foot-tall light tower at the Monroe Welcome Center ... on an expressway and well away from any lake. But, Michigan has many lighthouses along the Great Lakes and the state often uses iconic images of lighthouses in their advertising and chose the image as an appropriate welcome to visitors entering the state on its major north–south route.") In 2004, MDOT decided to renovate the center and declared the structure obsolete. It was scheduled to be demolished. After concerns were raised about this decision, the state government agreed that the structure should be dismantled and moved to a location where it would be useful. Serendipitously, while attending a conference for municipal officials, St. Ignace civic leaders learned of its availability. The civic leaders successfully applied to serve as the new location of the structure, and the lighthouse was disassembled into five pieces and trucked more than 330 miles (530 km) from Monroe to East Moran Bay in St. Ignace, Michigan.

When it was at the welcome center, the hexagonal tower was painted white, with green and red trim. The original lighthouse was welded by a single man; Ed Morris, owner of the Morris Machine Shop in Bay City, Michigan, was chosen because of his skill as a welder. The original plans called for a 36-foot-tall (11 m) structure, but he went to the larger height of 52 feet (16 m) to "challenge himself". (Note: The connection to St. Ignace held special significance to Morris. His father was employed on one of the Straits of Mackinac ferries that were operated by the State of Michigan.) The lighthouse was one of three that he built for Michigan welcome centers. The other two were at New Buffalo, Michigan and Clare, Michigan.

Morris worked with eight men and it took about three months to complete the projects. As Morris explained to the St. Ignace News, "his lighthouses were to be designed as museum-quality attractions at welcome centers ... to make an imposing first impression on visitors." They had a 12-foot-diameter (3.7 m) base. Morris opined that anything in excess of 16 m was beyond his bailiwick. He also suggested that its steel structure should make it highly resistant to storms.

Transporting the structure by truck north from Monroe to St. Ignace cost $20,000 by itself. The project cost $50,000 all total including the transporting, repair, and erection. Half was provided by the Michigan Waterways Commission and small community donations paid the rest. The lighthouse was reassembled using a crane in 2006. Based upon a survey of residents, it was named Wawatam Lighthouse in honor of a railroad car ferry that had been home-ported in St. Ignace for many decades, SS Chief Wawatam. (Note: "The Coast Guard required that the lighthouse be named before the application for the light could be processed. 'To keep the process moving, a poll quickly was taken with people at St. Ignace City Hall. Wawatam was the first choice and it provided a tie to the dock's history,' said Mr. Elmer.) After reassembly, the Wawatam Lighthouse was relit on August 20, 2006. The lighthouse is now an official United States Coast Guard privately maintained aid to navigation, USCG 7–12608, on Lake Huron. Maintenance is by the city of St. Ignace. Public access is by walking the pier.

=== Wawatam Pier ===
Truck route for transporting lighthouse to St. Ignace (Upper Peninsula of Michigan)

The chosen location for the rebuilt lighthouse was the former St. Ignace railroad pier, originally built in the 1800s as the home port of a train ferry. Operated by a joint venture that included St. Ignace's Duluth, South Shore and Atlantic Railway, the ferry shuttled railroad cars across the Straits of Mackinac. Starting soon after its launch date in 1911, these duties were fulfilled by the 338-foot-long (103 m) Chief Wawatam. Designed by Frank E. Kirby and built by the Toledo Shipbuilding Company, the Chief "carried as many as 28 rail cars per trip between Mackinaw City and St. Ignace." The ferry boat, in turn, had been named in honor of a leading Straits of Mackinac local resident of the 1700s, the Odawa clan leader Wawatam.

The St. Ignace dock collapsed in 1984, and in 1986 the successor railroad abandoned the last rail link to St. Ignace. This ended the ferry era. A truncated stretch of tracks and the track elevator (which oriented the tracks so the cars could be loaded on the ferry) were still visible as of 2014. On the dock, within a short distance from the light, is a 6 foot (1.8 m) tall wooden statue honoring Wawatam. Erected in 2012 by the city, it was designed and carved by Tom Paquin and Sally Paquin, local artists.

=== Status ===
The new lighthouse is duly noted on newer navigational charts. and operates year-round. It not only guides mariners but is a beacon for snowmobilers traveling across the frozen Straits of Mackinac to and from Mackinac Island in winter. The lighthouse and harbor also serve Coast Guard ice breakers, such as the tug Katmai Bay (Note: Katmai Bay is stationed at Sault Ste. Marie, Michigan.) and heavy duty breaker Mackinaw. (Note: The Mackinaw is stationed at Cheboygan, Michigan.)

The lighthouse was the featured lighthouse of the Michigan Lighthouse festival in 2015. As of 2017, this was the latest addition to Michigan's 150 listed (including historical and now demolished) lighthouses.

== Location ==
The Wawatam Lighthouse is located in downtown St. Ignace, at the eastern end of McCann Street near its intersection with North State Street, St. Ignace's main waterfront highway.
