= Wawatam =

18th-century Odawa chief

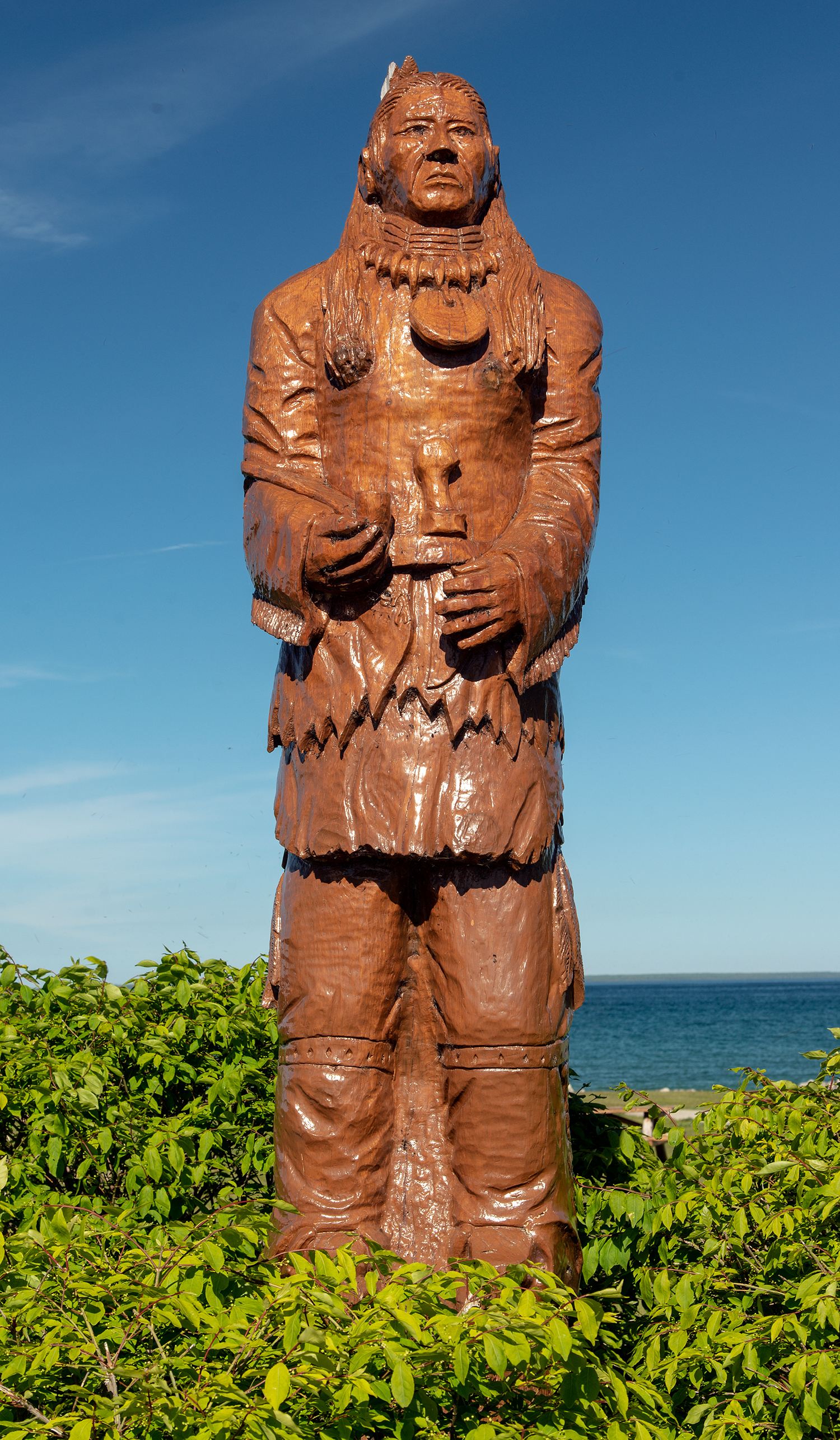
Ojibwa Chief Wawatam statue in Mackinaw City.

Wawatam (little goose) (fl. 1762 – 1764) was an 18th-century Odawa chief who lived in the northern region of present-day Michigan's Lower Peninsula in an area along the Lake Michigan shoreline known by the Odawa as Waganawkezee (it is bent).

== Life ==
Wawatam was likely born near the Odawa Middle Village, Anamiewatigoing, now Cross Village. He is known through his rescue of and friendship with British fur trader Alexander Henry the elder from the Ojibwas following the capture of Fort Michilimackinac in June 1763 during Pontiac's Rebellion. Wawatam, the leader and patriarch of an extended family of Odawa, rescued Henry after he had initially become an Ojibwe possession as a spoil of war, and soon thereafter, again came to Henry's rescue by hiding him in a Cave on nearby Mackinac Island. For nearly a year after this second rescue (1763-1764), he lived as part of Wawatam's family, following them on their seasonal moves to hunting and fishing areas inland from Lake Michigan. Henry's observations of Odawa hunting and living practices became a significant contribution to Algonquian anthropology.

Henry later returned to "civilization." Successful as a fur trader in later life, he always credited Wawatam with saving his life. The 18th century fort, scene of Wawatam's rescue of Henry, has been reconstructed and is now an active living history museum. The site is located just west of downtown Mackinaw City at the Lower Peninsula's headland.

== Legacy ==
On the dock at St. Ignace and within shadow distance from the Wawatam Lighthouse is a 6 foot (1.8 m) tall wooden statue honoring Chief Wawatam which was erected in 2012 by the City of St. Ignace, Michigan. It was designed and carved by Tom Paquin and Sally Paquin, local artists.

- Wawatam Township, Emmet County, Michigan, the northernmost township of Emmet County where Fort Michilimackinac is located, is named after Wawatam.
- SS Chief Wawatam, a coal-fired train ferry and icebreaker that operated in the Straits of Mackinac between 1911–1984 was named in his honor.
