= Ferries in Michigan =

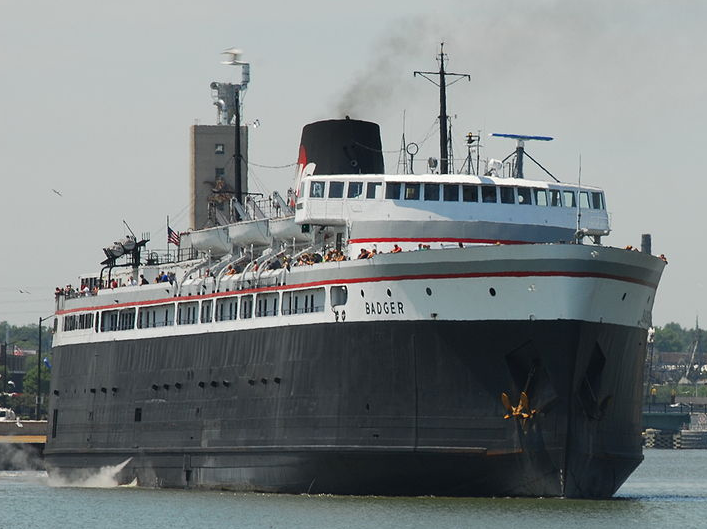
SS Badger, departing Manitowoc

Due to its unique geography, being made of two peninsulas surrounded by the Great Lakes, Michigan has depended on many ferries for connections to transport people, vehicles and trade. The most famous modern ferries are those which carry people and goods across the Straits of Mackinac to the car-free Mackinac Island but before the Mackinac Bridge was built, large numbers of ferries carried people and cars between the two peninsulas. Other ferries continue to provide transportation to small islands and across the Detroit River to Canada. Ferries once provided transport to island parks for city dwellers. The state's only national park, Isle Royale cannot be reached by road and is normally accessed by ferry. The largest ferries in Michigan are the car ferries which cross Lake Michigan to Wisconsin. One of these, the SS Badger is one of the last remaining coal steamers on the Great Lakes and serves as a section of US Highway 10 (US 10). The Badger is also the largest ferry in Michigan, capable of carrying 600 passengers and 180 autos.

As of 2018, there are 18 ferry routes in Michigan, 13 of which have ferries which can carry vehicles. Three ferry routes cross the international border between U.S. and Canada. Ferry trips can be as short as a few minutes crossing a river to as long as seven hours crossing Lake Superior. These routes are all closed in the winter when the rivers and lakes are iced over. Winter closures can be as long as four months a year. Four passenger-only ferry destinations are islands without private vehicles and, in some cases, without even roads. One unique human-powered ferry takes passengers across the Kalamazoo River to a park with a Lake Michigan beach.

In the early days of lake transport, it is difficult or impossible to differentiate between ferries, package freighters carrying passengers, and passenger liners on regular routes. The lakes and rivers often provided an easier route of travel than primitive or non-existent roads. Rail ferries would carry passenger trains and their occupants as well as freight cars, and later sometimes carried automobiles as well. Several of the busiest ferry routes were replaced by bridges or tunnels: Detroit to Windsor, Belle Isle, the Sault Ste. Maries, St. Ignace to Mackinaw City, Port Huron to Sarnia. Boblo ceased to be a destination with the closure of the amusement park. Changes in laws and industry lead to the end of the Lake Michigan railroad ferries.

The first autos crossed the Straits of Mackinac in 1917 on the SS Chief Wawatam. In 1923, the state of Michigan began an auto ferry service that was the first such system to be state-owned. It continued until the day the Mackinac Bridge opened. The law required the ferry service to cease so that the bridge would not have competition and could pay off its construction bonds faster. The passenger ferries and many of the rail ferries across the Detroit and St. Clair rivers had ended after the bridges and tunnels were built.

The ferries pioneered concepts in ship design and icebreaking techniques. Bow propellers and steel spoon-shaped bows made the rail ferries the best icebreakers on the lakes for many years until the dedicated U.S. Coast Guard icebreakers were assigned during World War II. In contrast, the ferries later had some of the most outdated equipment on the Lakes. The Badger, still in service in 2019, is the last coal-fired Great Lakes passenger steamer. The Chief Wawatam was the last hand-fed coal steamer and the Landsdowne was the last paddlewheeler when it was converted to a barge in 1970.

The Detroit-Windsor ferries were popular with small-scale bootleggers during Prohibition, especially as border guards were reluctant to search young Canadian women who worked in Detroit offices.

== Automobile ferries ==
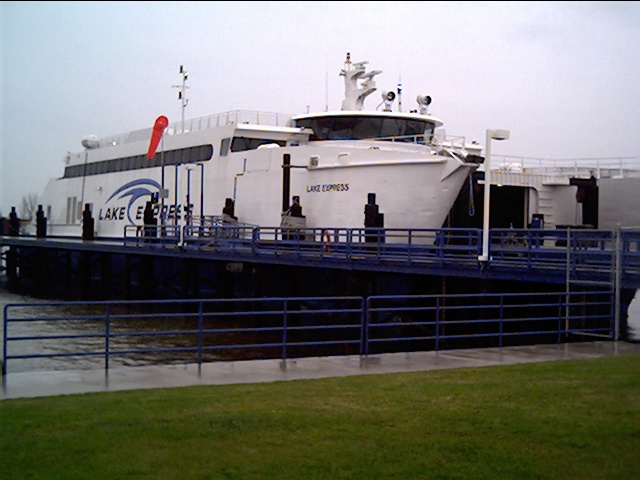
Lake Express at dock

=== Lake Michigan ===
==== Cross-lake ====
- SS Badger, cross-lake, Ludington, Michigan to Manitowoc, Wisconsin, connecting US Highway 10 (US 10) with its counterpart in Wisconsin, 4 hours
- HSC Lake Express, cross-lake, Muskegon, Michigan to Milwaukee, Wisconsin, 2.5 hours

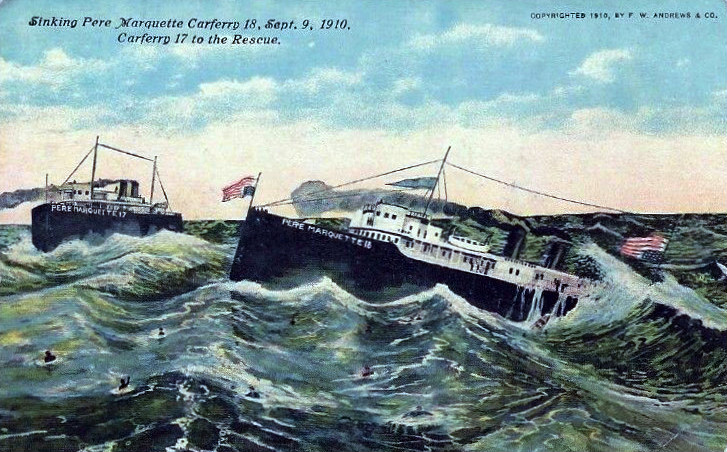
Postcard illustration of sinking ferry 18, with ferry 17 coming to its aid.1910

==== Beaver Island ====
Current boats

- Beaver Islander, (built 1962), Charlevoix, Michigan to Beaver Island, 2 hours
- Emerald Isle, (built 1997), Charlevoix to Beaver Island, 2 hours

Retired boats

- Emerald Isle (built 1955), in use 1955–62, then a Mackinac ferry until 1982, now Diamond Jack cruise on the Detroit River
- South Shore, (built 1945), for Miller Boat Line, Put-in-Bay, Ohio. Operated to Beaver Island from 1973 to 1997. Sold in 1999 to Shoreline Sightseeing Cruises, Chicago.

=== St. Marys River ===
Ferry service to Sugar Island began in 1928 and to Neebish Island service in 1933, provided by private companies. The Eastern Upper Peninsula Transportation Authority assumed their operations in 1980.

==== Neebish Island ====
- Neebish Islander II, (built 1946), Neebish Island ferry, Barbeau, former Sugar Islander I
- Neebish Islander III, (built 2022)

==== Sugar Island ====
- Sugar Islander II, (built 1995), Sugar Island to Sault Ste. Marie

=== Lake Huron ===
==== Bois Blanc Island ====
- Kristen D (1987), Cheboygan to Bois Blanc Island

==== Drummond Island ====
Current boats

De Tour Village to Drummond Island, connecting M-134 across the DeTour Passage, since 1975, part of the Eastern Upper Peninsula Transportation Authority

- Drummond Islander III (built 1989)
- Drummond Islander IV, (built 2000)

Retired boats

- Clyde, in use 1905–08
- Naida, in use 1915–24
- Drummond, in use 1922–24 and 1931–32
- Phillip, in use 1922–30, destroyed by fire
- Wallan (built 1933), in use 1933–47, run by Road Commission from 1943 as Sam C. Taylor
- Drummond Islander I (built 1947), sold to Arnold Line and renamed Mackinac Islander
- Drummond Islander II, in use 1961–89, sold to MCM Marine as tugboat

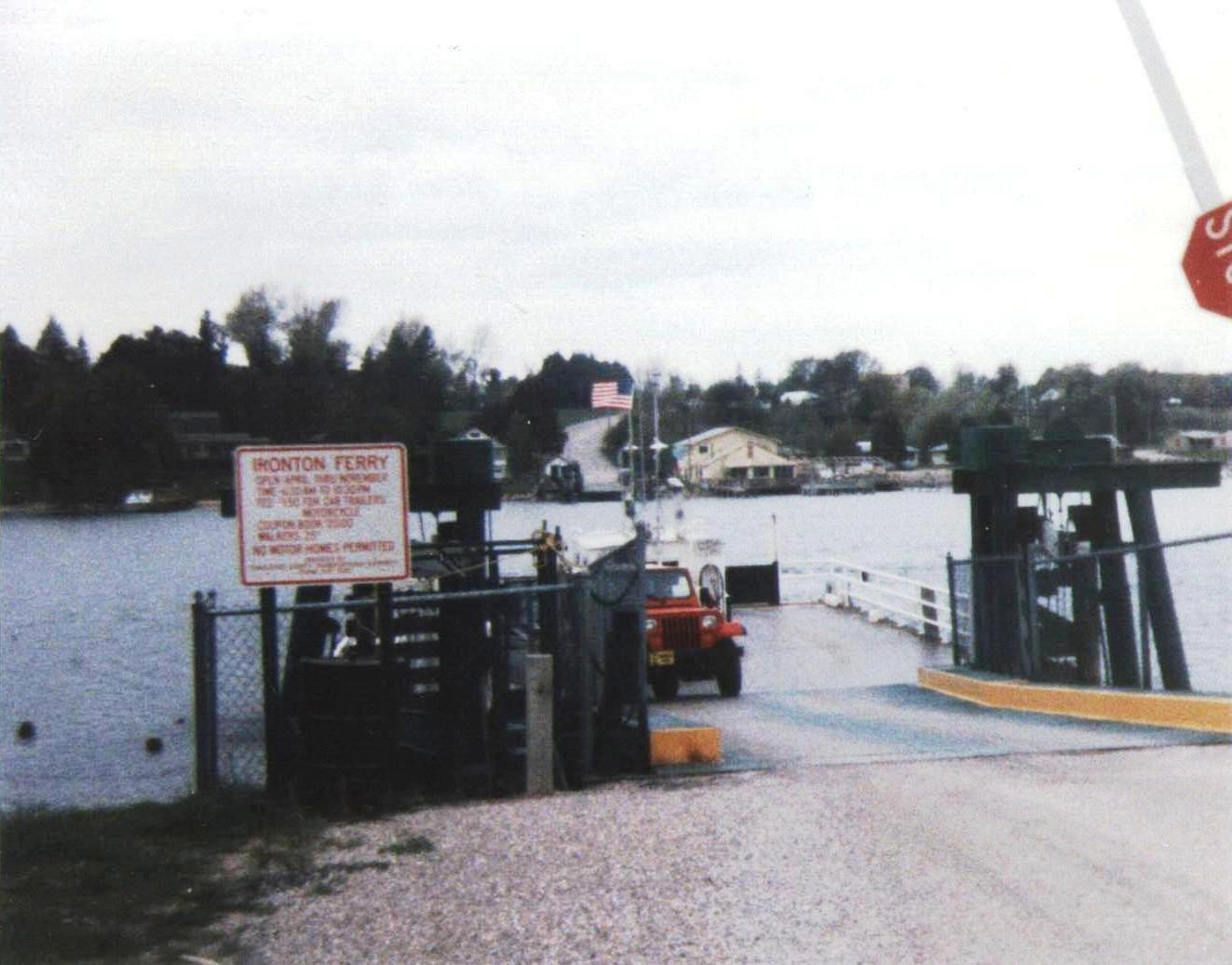
Ironton Ferry, capacity 4 cars

=== St. Clair River ===
- Champion's Auto Ferry, Harsens Island, connecting M-154 to the mainland
  - Arthur R Champion (1941)
  - North Channel (1967)
  - South Channel (1973)
  - Middle Channel (1996)
- Walpole–Algonac Ferry
- Former Sombra–Marine City (Bluewater) Ferry – closed in January 2018
  - Daldean of Chatham (sold 2020)
  - Ontamich (built 1939, sold 2020)
  Former vessel
  - Lowell D of Chatham

=== Detroit River ===
Former

- Detroit–Windsor Truck Ferry (closed 2023)

=== Internal ===
Lake Charlevoix

- Ironton Ferry, southern arm of Lake Charlevoix, the Charlevoix a cable ferry built 1926 has a capacity of four vehicles on Ferry Road off M-66.

== Passenger-only ferries ==
=== Lake Superior ===
==== Isle Royale ====
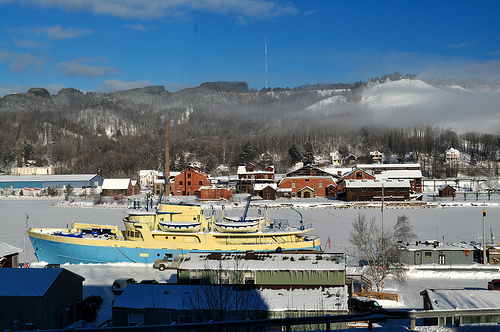
The National Park Service's ferry, Ranger III

- Isle Royale Queen IV, Copper Harbor, Michigan to Rock Harbor, Isle Royale National Park, 3.5 hours
- Ranger III, Houghton, Michigan to Rock Harbor, Isle Royale, 6 hours
- Sea Hunter, Grand Portage, Minnesota to Windigo, Isle Royale, 1.5 hours
- Voyageur II, Grand Portage, Minnesota to Isle Royale, 2–7.5 hours, multiple stops

==== Grand Island ====
- Grand Island ferry, Grand Island National Recreation Area

=== Lake Michigan ===
==== Manitou Islands ====
- Mishe-Mokwa, Manitou Island Transit, North Manitou Island, 1 hour, and South Manitou Island, 1.5 hours

==== Little Traverse Bay ====
- Jacob's Run, the Little Traverse Bay Ferry, begun 2020, connecting Petoskey, Harbor Springs and Bay Harbor on Little Traverse Bay, half hour trip, a previous ferry on this route closed in the 1940s

=== Straits of Mackinac ===
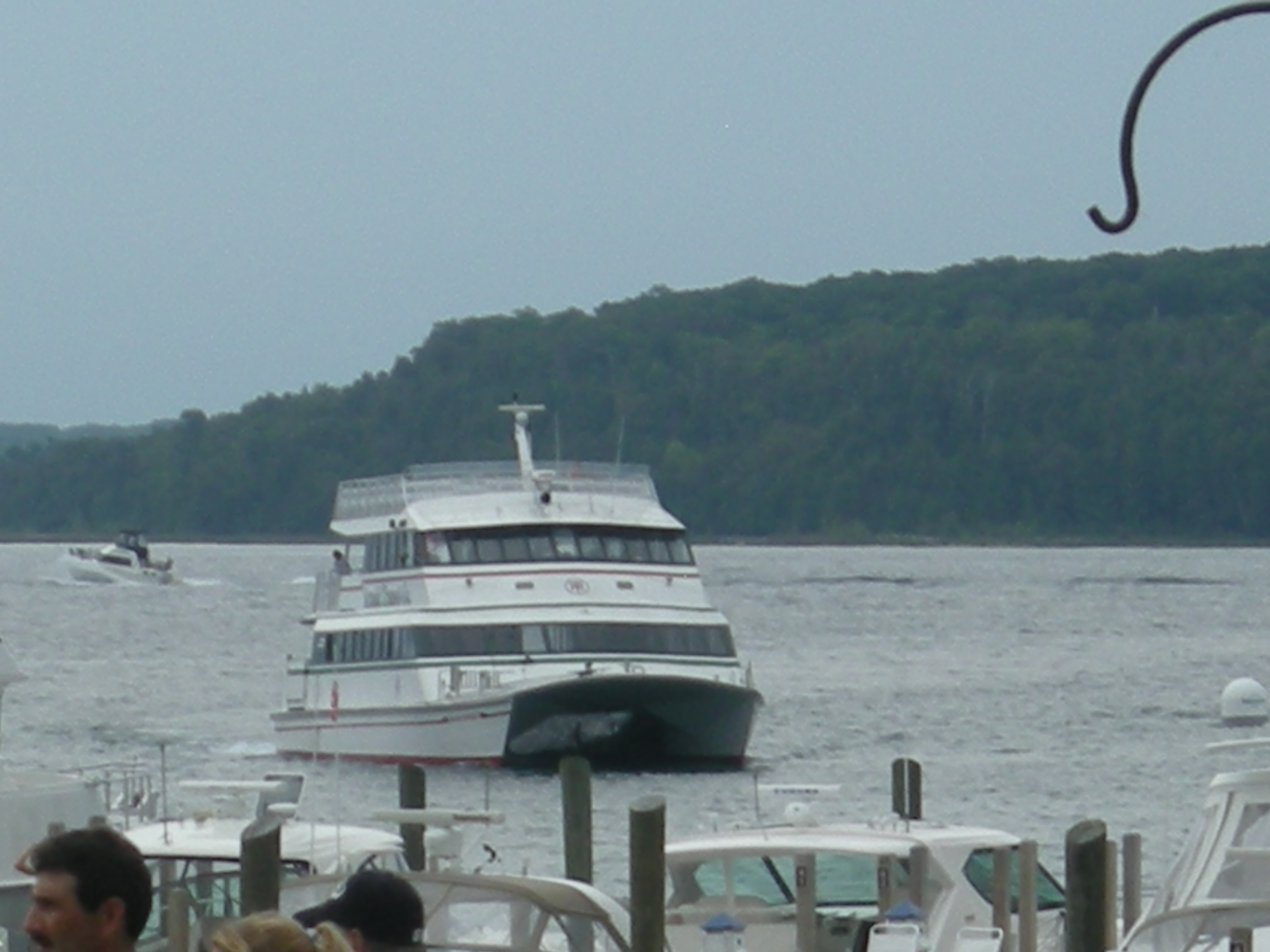
The M/V Mackinac Express during her time as an Arnold Line catamaran ferry at Mackinac Island

- Arnold Transit Company (most assets purchased by Star Line—now Mackinac Island Ferry Company—in 2016)

Current boats
- Algomah (1961)
- Beaver, (1952), freight
- Chippewa (1962)
- Corsair (1955), freight
- Huron (1955)
- Mackinac Express (1987), catamaran
- Mackinac Islander (1947), formerly Drummond Islander, freight
- Ottawa (1959)
- Straits of Mackinac II (1969)
Former boats
- Emerald Isle Built 1955 for Beaver Island Boat Company. Owned by Arnold Line from 1962 to 1982. Now in Detroit as the Diamond Jack.
- Algomah (built 1881), in use until the 1930s
- Chippewa, 1883 to 1943 ran a Cheboygan–Mackinac Island–Sault Ste. Marie route
- Detroit, later called Iroquois (built 1922)
- Mackinac (1909)
- Mackinac Islander (1922), in use 1938–69, originally The Oliver H. Perry, later freighter and sank as Alaska crab fishing boat Belair in 1974
- Mackinac Islander (1958), sold in the 1980s, now Diamond Belle of Diamond Jack's River Cruises on the Detroit River
- Mohawk (1956), since 1995 Diamond Queen of Diamond Jack's River Cruises
- Island Express (1988), catamaran, now Pictured Rocks Express of Pictured Rocks Cruises in Munising, Michigan.
- Straits Express (1995), catamaran, was in New York City being used as a commuter ferry for Hornblower Cruises after leaving Michigan. It is now in service under the same name as a ferry in Puerto Rico operated by Hornblower Marine Services.

- Shepler's Ferry
  - Capt. Shepler (1986)
  - Felicity (1972)
  - The Hope (1976)
  - Miss Margy (2015)
  - Sacre Bleu (1959), formerly Put-in-Bay, freight
  - The Welcome (1969)
  - Wyandot (1979)
- Mackinac Island Ferry Company (formerly Star Line), (originally Argosy Boat Line (1962–1977), named Star Line (1977–2022))

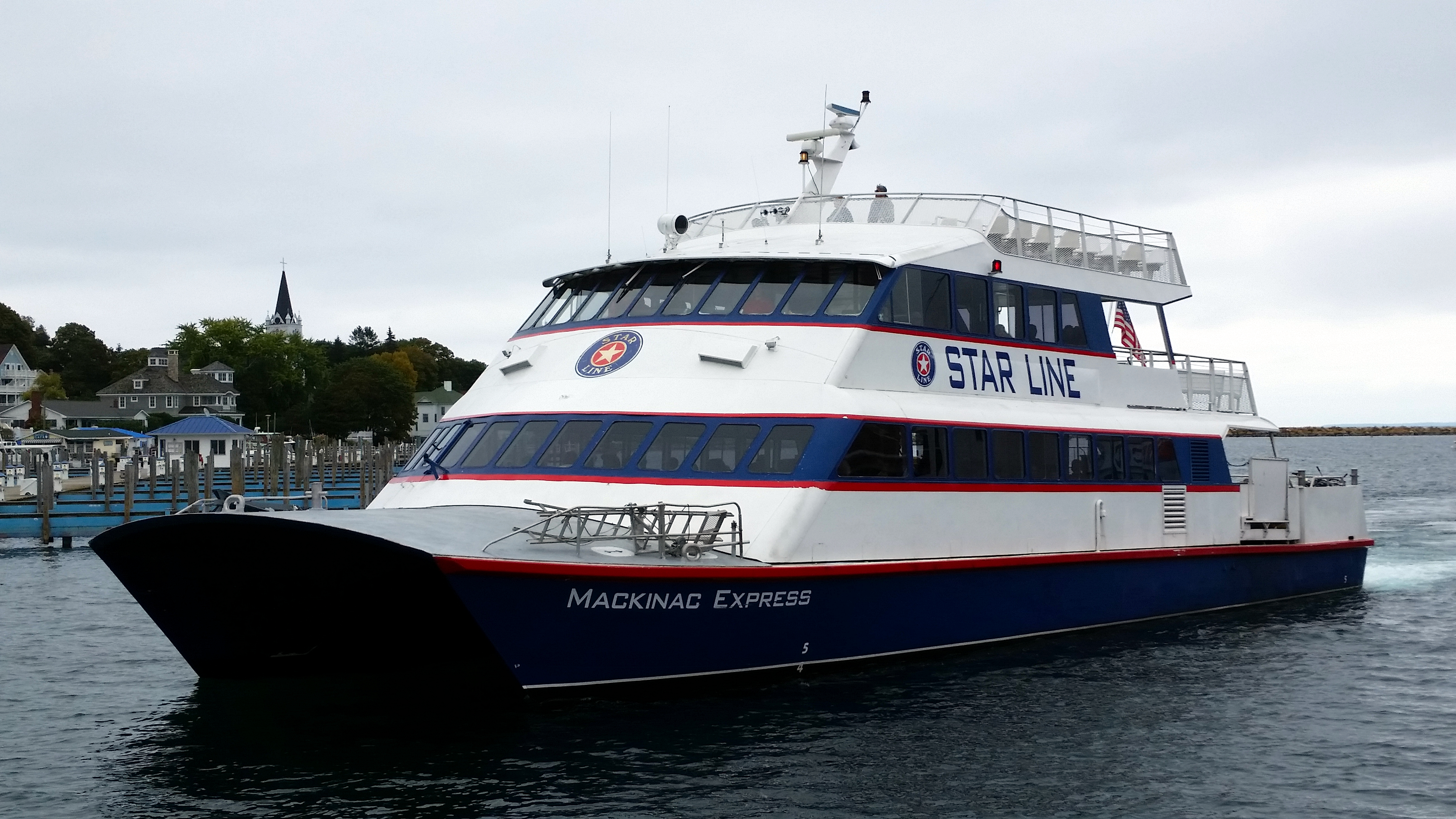
The M/V Mackinac Express in her Star Line Ferry livery.

Current boats
- La Salle (1983)
- Radisson (1988)
- Cadillac (1990)
- Joliet (1993)
- Marquette II (2005)
- Anna May (2012)

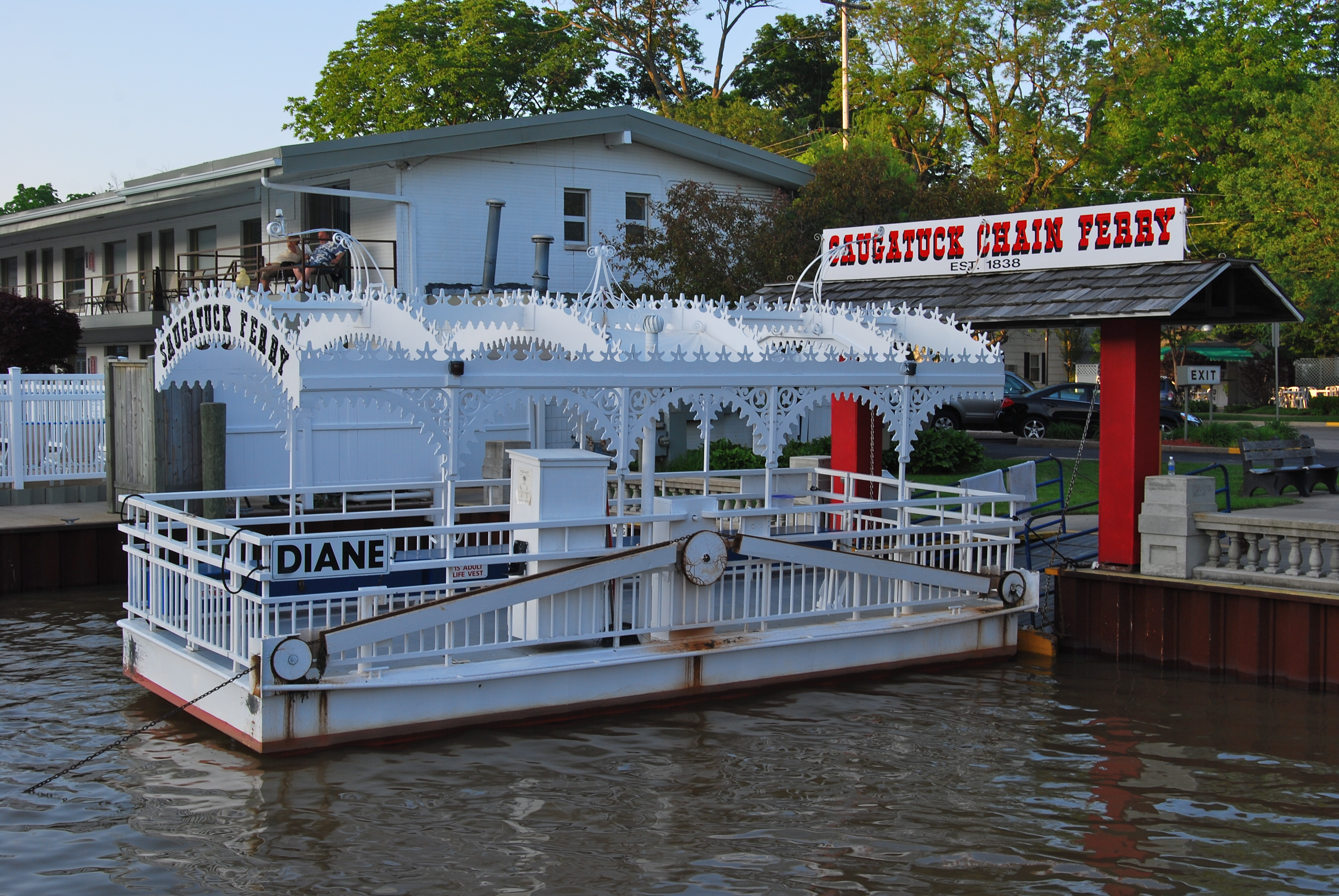
Saugatuck Chain Ferry

Retired boats
- La Salle
- Nicolet
- Treasure Islander
- Flamingo
- Marquette (1979)

=== St. Clair River ===
- Russell Island Ferry (private)

=== Internal ===
- Diane, the Saugatuck Chain Ferry, a chain ferry across the Kalamazoo River at Saugatuck, site of a ferry since 1838

== Defunct ferries ==
=== Lake Michigan ===
==== Rail ferries to Wisconsin ====
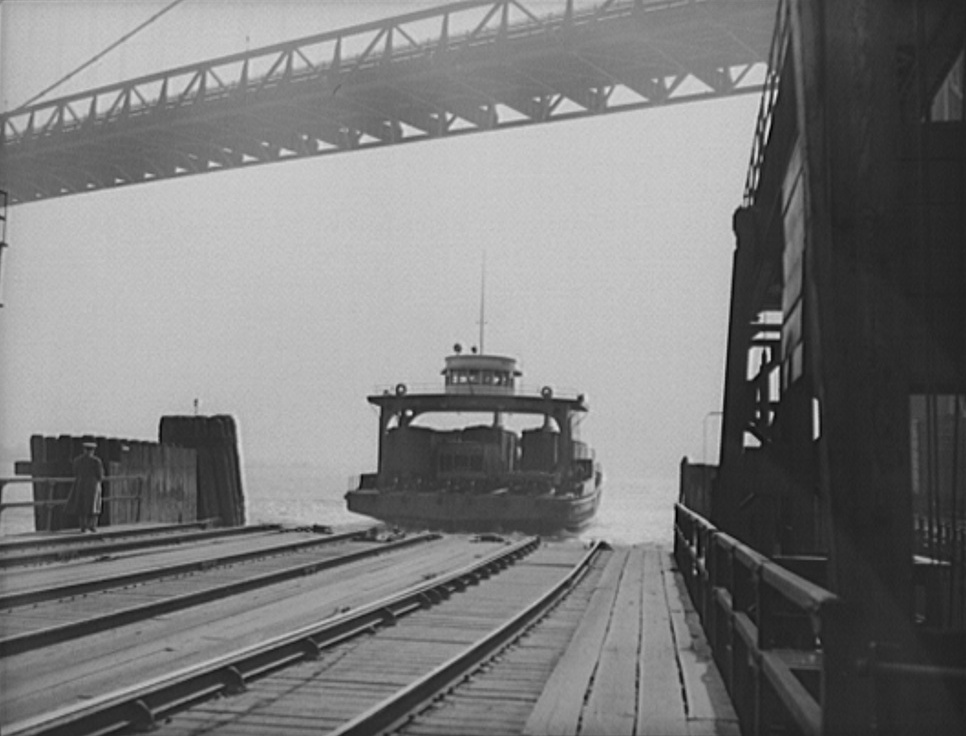
Small rail ferry docking in Detroit, 1943. Photograph by Arthur Siegel.

The Ann Arbor Railroad, Grand Trunk, and Chesapeake and Ohio ran train ferries across Lake Michigan. Several of these also carried passengers in the upper decks.

- Ann Arbor Railroad ran ferries from Betsie Lake, Elberta, Michigan to Manistique, Michigan and Kewaunee, Wisconsin from 1892, Menominee, Michigan from 1894, Gladstone, Michigan from 1895, Manitowoc, Wisconsin from 1896. Service ended in 1982.
  - SS Ann Arbor No. 1 (built 1892), burned to the waterline, 1910
  - SS Ann Arbor No. 2 (1892), in use until 1912, converted to barge Whale, a sandsucker
  - SS Ann Arbor No. 3 (1898)
  - SS Ann Arbor No. 4 (1906), sold to the state to ferry autos at Mackinac, renamed City of Cheboygan, 1937
  - SS Ann Arbor No. 5 (1910), sold to Bultema Dredge & Dock Co in 1967, used for the construction of the Palisades Nuclear Power Plant near South Haven. 150 ft of stern sank on way to Padnos salvage in 1970. Stern rediscovered in May 2005 by Michigan Shipwreck Research Association(MSRA)
  - SS Ann Arbor No. 6 (1917), renamed Arthur K. Atkinson in 1959, served a route from Frankfort, Michigan to Manitowoc, Wisconsin from 1980 to 1982
  - SS Ann Arbor No. 7 (1925), rebuilt as Viking and in service until 1982
  - Maitland No. 1, chartered for part of 1915
  - SS Wabash (1927)
  - SS City of Milwaukee, a Grand Trunk Western vessel was leased in 1978.
- Grand Trunk Milwaukee Car Ferry Company ran rail ferries from Grand Haven, Michigan to Milwaukee, Wisconsin from 1903 to 1933. From 1933 to 1978 the route was Muskegon to Milwaukee.
  - SS Milwaukee (built 1902) formerly Manistique, Marquette & Northern 1, sank near Milwaukee in 1929, with 52 dead
  - SS Grand Haven (built 1903)
  - SS Grand Rapids (1926)
  - SS Madison (1927)
  - SS City of Milwaukee, (built 1930), sailed for Grand Trunk until 1978.

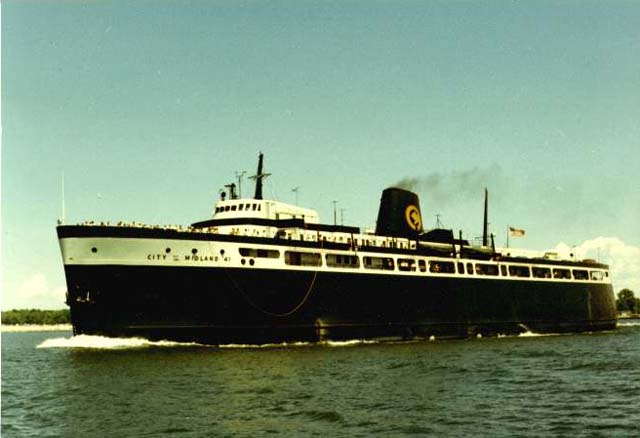
SS City of Midland 41 in 1976

- Pere Marquette Railway, later part of the Chesapeake and Ohio Railway, ran rail ferries from Ludington to Milwaukee, Wisconsin, Kewaunee, Wisconsin and Manitowoc, Wisconsin in Wisconsin. Their superintendent for over 30 years was William L. Mercereau. The last route (Kewaunee) ended on July 1, 1983. Michigan-Wisconsin Transportation Company acquired the ferries and ran until 1990.
  - Pere Marquette 15 (built 1896), in service 1900–35
  - Pere Marquette 16 (1895), in service 1900–14, worked for Detroit, Grand Rapids & Western 1898–99
  - Pere Marquette 17 (1901), in service until 1940, converted to auto ferry in 1940 at Straits of Mackinac, scrapped in 1961
  - Pere Marquette 18 (1st) (1902), in service until 1910, sank in Lake Michigan with 29 lives lost
  - Pere Marquette 19 (1903), in service until 1940
  - Pere Marquette 20 (1903), in service until 1938, converted to auto ferry at Straits of Mackinac in 1938, converted to warehouse in 1959
  - Pere Marquette 18 (2nd) (1911), in service until 1952
  - Pere Marquette 21 (1924), in service until 1973
  - Pere Marquette 22 (1924), in service until 1973
  - City of Saginaw 31 (1929), in service until 1973
  - City of Flint 32 (1930), in service until 1969, converted to barge Roanoke
  - SS City of Midland 41 (1941), in use until 1983, now the barge Pere Marquette 41
  - SS Badger (1952), in use until 1990, later converted to an auto ferry, still in that service
  - SS Spartan (1952), in use until 1979, laid up in Ludington, used for parts for Badger

==== Passenger and auto ferries ====
- Wisconsin and Michigan Steamship Company
  - Illinois
  - SS Milwaukee Clipper (built 1904), in use 1941–70, Muskegon, Michigan to Milwaukee, Wisconsin, 900 passengers and 180 autos

=== Straits of Mackinac ===
Before the construction of the Mackinac Bridge connecting the two peninsulas of Michigan, car and train ferries crossed between Mackinaw City, Michigan and St. Ignace. The early transport across the Straits was by private boat. The first large commercial concerns were the railways whose ferries pioneered concepts in ice breaking and ship design. The state took over auto traffic after complaints that the railways service was too expensive and unreliable for motorists.

==== Early ferries ====
- Mary Queen
- Gazelle
- Lotus

==== Straits of Mackinac auto ferries ====
The state provided auto ferry service between 1923 and 1957. The ferries carried almost 1 million cars a year in the mid-1950s before the bridge opened in 1957. At that time, there were five ferries running with a total capacity of 500 cars; the largest ferry could carry 150. In their last year of service, the state ferries employed 400 people.

- Michigan State Ferries
  - Ariel (bought used 1923) unused after 1923, sold 1925
  - Sainte Ignace (1924) sold 1940
  - Mackinaw City (1924) sold 1940
  - The Straits of Mackinac (1928)
  - City of Cheboygan (1937), formerly Ann Arbor No.4
  - City of Munising (1938), formerly Pere Marquette 20
  - City of Petoskey (1940) formerly Pere Marquette 17
  - Vacationland (1952), largest ferry, made last run of the service in November, 1957.

==== Rail ferries across the Straits of Mackinac ====
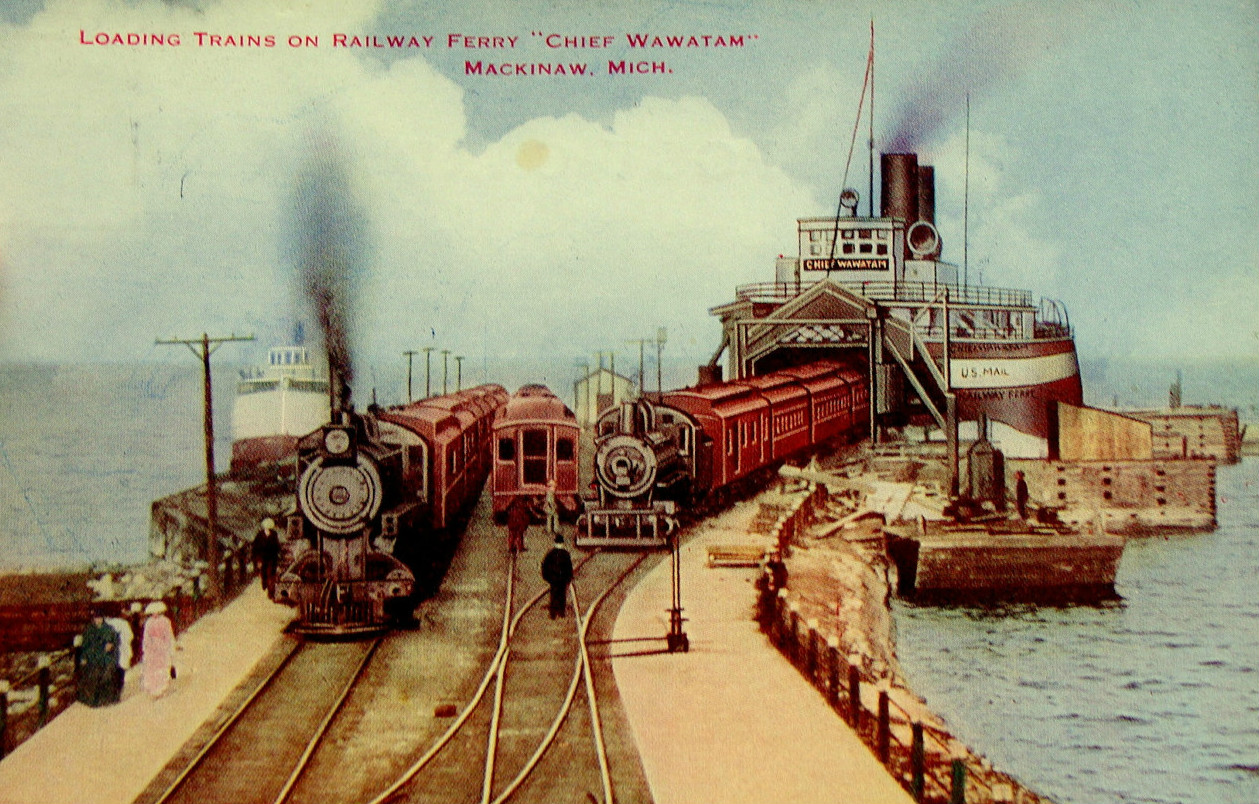
SS Chief Wawatam loading rail cars

- Mackinac Transportation Company formed in 1881 by Grand Rapids & Indiana, Michigan Central, and Detroit, Mackinac, and Marquette railroads. Service continued until 1984 when the dock at St. Ignace collapsed. From 1923 until 1952, the Sainte Marie II and Chief Wawatam carried autos for the state ferry service during the heavy ice periods in winter.
  - Algomah (1880–95), also towed the rail barge Betsy, after 1895 sold to Island Transportation Company
  - St. Ignace
  - Saint Marie I
  - Saint Marie II (1912–61)
  - Chief Wawatam (1910–84), the last hand-fed coal steamer on the Great Lakes

==== Mackinac Island ====
- Island Transportation Company was part owned by George Arnold and employed Bill Shepler as one of its captains. The service ran from St. Ignace to Mackinac Island. It merged with the Arnold Line (whose service was Mackinaw City to Mackinac Island) in June 1946.
  - Algoma, (built 1880), in service from 1895
  - Algoma II (1922), in service 1936–46, later with Arnold Line until 1960

=== Sault Ste. Marie (St. Mary's River) ===
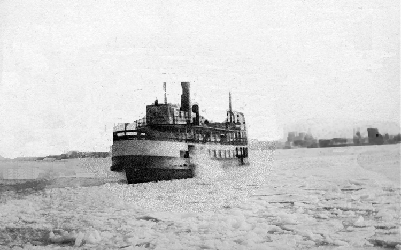
Early International Transit ferry, possibly Bawating

  - Dime, first steam ferry at Soo, wood-fired
- American-based company started by Sam Bernier (by 1865 - 1903)
  - M.I. Mills (in service by 1865 - ), passenger only
- International Transit Company (Canadian company) (1901 - 1962)
  - Bawating, (1910–1915) passenger ferry (had been Fortune running Detroit-Windsor route)
  - Agoming, (1926–1962), auto ferry
  - James W. Curran, (1947–1962), auto ferry
  - John A. McPhail, (1955–1962) auto ferry

International Transit Company was purchased by Ontario during the building of the Sault Ste. Marie International Bridge; the government operated the ferries until the bridge opened in 1962.

=== St. Clair River ===
Many ferries carried passengers, mostly between Sarnia and Port Huron before the Blue Water Bridge opened in 1938. In 1937, ferries had carried 1,174,846 passengers, 220,555 automobiles, 1,222 trucks and 267 motorcycles. Rail transport continued for many years.

- Early ferries
  - The first licensed ferry was in 1836, a sailboat owned by Crampton
  - George Moffat began a ferry service with a craft made of 3 canoes and powered by two ponies in the 1840s
  - A 4-horse boat and a 4-mule boat were in competition in the later 1840s
  - United, the first steam powered ferry owned by Moffatt began service in 1850
  - Sarnia, a paddlewheel steamer was brought into service by Moffatt in 1860, burned in 1877
  - G.A. Brush, 1860s, competitor to Moffatt's Sarnia
  - Fanny White, 1860s, competitor to Moffatt's Sarnia
  - Mystic, in service in 1877
  - Essex (built 1859, original route Detroit-Windsor)
- Port Huron Ferry Company formed in 1891 with ferries already in service, Company was bought out by state of Michigan in 1937 to prevent competition with the new bridge.
  - Grace Dormer (built 1868-after 1923), abandoned by 1925 when it was destroyed in a fire at a boneyard in Buffalo
  - James Beard (in use 1873-after 1923)
  - Omar D. Conger (1882–1922), on March 26, 1922, exploded at dock in Black River, 4 deaths
  - J.C. Clark, at Sarnia-Port Huron from late 1880s, burned 1905
  - Hiawatha, at Sarnia-Port Huron from late 1880s until about 1923
  - City of Cheboygan, renamed City of Port Huron at Port Huron-Sarnia 1917 to 1937, sank at dock 1939
  - Ariel, 1920s-1937, sold for scrap 1941
  - Louis Philippe, 1921 only, first auto ferry at Port Huron-Sarnia
  - Lawrence, 1921–1934, first auto ferry at Port Huron-Sarnia
  - City of Sarnia, 1923–1937, sold for scrap 1953, largest ferry could carry 1000 passengers and 42 autos.
- Blue Water Ferry Company (1946–1957) using converted military landing craft as passenger only ferries and reusing the older ship's names.
  - City of Sarnia
  - City of Port Huron
- Rail ferries served Sarnia, Ontario to Port Huron, Michigan from 1859 to 1890.
  - The earliest ferry was a chain ferry on a 1000-foot chain across the river in the 1860s. The unpowered vessel and its chain became a navigation concern.
- Grand Trunk/Canadian National
  - International (1872), hull built in England, assembled in Canada, later in use for Pere Marquette on St. Clair River from 1903 to 1927
  - Huron, (1875), hull built in England, assembled in Canada
- Pere Marquette Railroad
  - International (1872), built for Grand Trunk, later in use for Pere Marquette on St. Clair River from 1903 to 1927
  - Pere Marquette 10 (built 1945), in use as ferry until 1974, in use as barge until 1995
  - Pere Marquette 12 (1927), sold to Canadian National in 1969, renamed St. Clair, converted to barge 1980s, in use until 1995
  - Pere Marquette 14 (1904), in use until 1957
- CSX service ended October 7, 1994

=== Detroit River ===
==== Detroit to Windsor ====
- Passenger and auto ferries
  - Early ferries, ordered by date of entering service
      - Among the earliest ferry service were the canoes owned by Louis Davenport, which were fitted with runners and pushed across the ice in wintertime
    - Olive Branch (the Horse Ferry), (1825-?), a horse-powered sidewheeler, could carry wagons and cattle
    - Argo, (1830–1834), first steamboat ferry at Detroit
    - Lady of the Lake (1834-?)
    - United (1836–1853) later called Alliance, then called Undine
    - Argo No. 2, built in 1848, in use until 1880
    - Ottawa, mostly used as tow barge due to oversupply of ferry boats in the 1860s
    - Windsor (1856–1866), steamer, burned with the loss of 30 lives, April 23, 1866 (hull rebuilt as barge, in use until it sank in Green Bay in 1893)
    - Mohawk, built about 1844 for British Revenue Service, ferry at Detroit mid-1850s, one of the first iron boats on the Great Lakes, later used on Great Lakes as passenger steamer, sank Lake Huron
    - Gem (1858-?), sidewheeler (ran Detroit to Amherstburg its first season)
    - Essex (built 1859 - in use until 1877), sold for use as ferry from Port Huron to Sarnia
    - Detroit (1862–1875), pulled burning Windsor out of dock in 1866, itself burned at Sandwich in September, 1875
    - Clara, early 1860s, screw steamer, ran Detroit-Windsor in winter, Detroit-Fort Wayne in summer
    - Favorite, in use 1867, out of service within a few years
  - Detroit Ferry Company and the Windsor Ferry Company combined in 1877 to form the Detroit and Windsor Ferry Company. In 1883 the company was renamed Detroit, Belle Isle and Windsor Ferry Company. It served Amhurstburg, Detroit, Windsor, Belle Isle, Bois Blanc Island (Boblo), and owned Peche Island.
    - Hope (built 1870) ("soon after converted into a propeller for lake service")
    - Victoria (1872), the first Great Lakes ferry built with ice-breaking hull
    - Fortune (1875–1910), later Bawating ferry at Sault Ste. Marie (1910–1915), converted to a tug and sank off Jekyll Island, Georgia, 1920
    - Excelsior (1876)
    - Garland (1880)
    - Sappho (1883), originally part of Walkerville and Detroit Ferry Company
    - Promise (1892)
    - Pleasure (1894)
    - Britannia (1906)
    - Lasalle (1922)
    - Cadillac (1928)
  - Walkerville and Detroit Ferry Company formed in 1881 by Hiram Walker and served a route from Detroit to Belle Isle to Walkerville, Ontario. Service ended in 1942.
    - Essex (built 1913), converted to tug 1942, ended career in Peru
    - Ariel (1882)

==== Detroit to Belle Isle ferry ====
- Belle Isle Park, 1840–1957

==== Detroit to Boblo Island ====
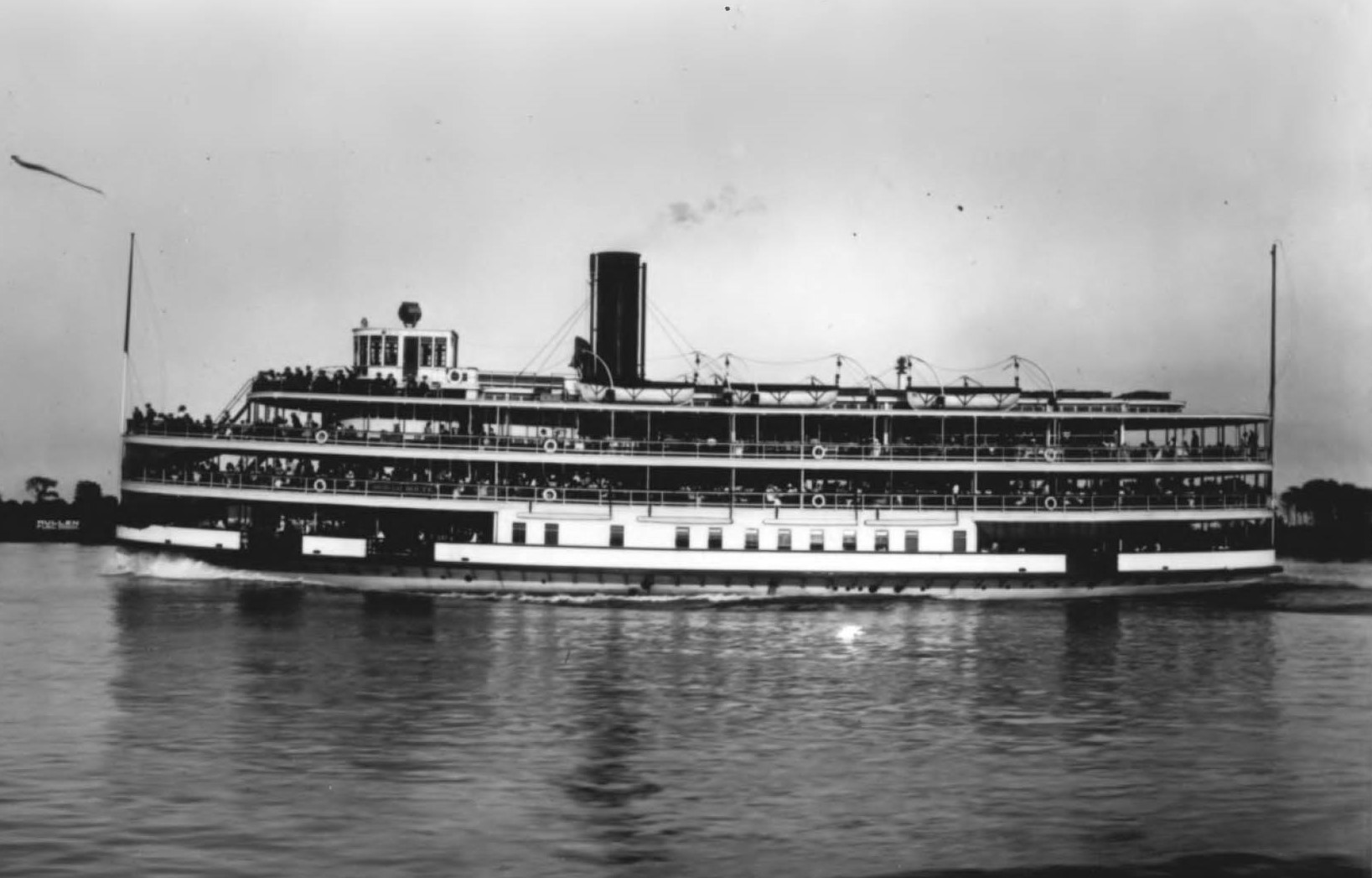
SS Ste. Claire, c. 1915

Ferry service ran to the island from 1898 to 1993 by the Bois Blanc Excursion Line (part of the Detroit, Belle Island, and Windsor Ferry Company)

- SS Columbia, Detroit to Boblo Island Amusement Park on Bois Blanc Island, 1.5 hours, 1902–91
- SS Ste. Clair, 1.5 hours, 1910–91

==== Detroit to Windsor rail ferries ====
- Canadian National CN discontinued passenger service in 1955.

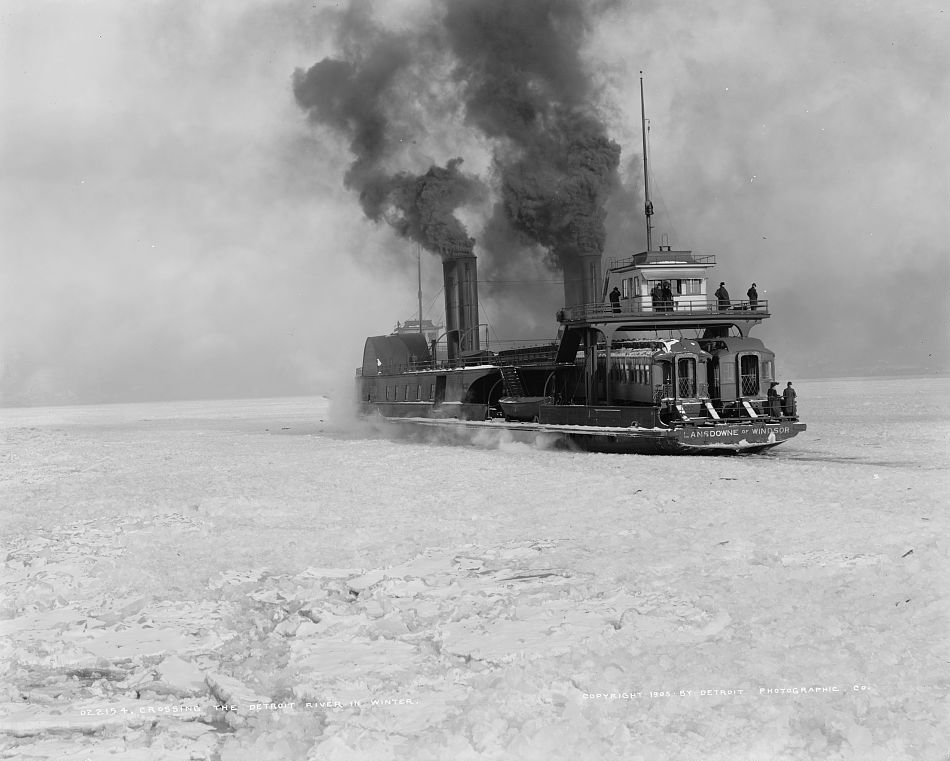
Landsdowne carrying passenger train cars in 1905

  - SS Lansdowne (built 1884), served until 1956, scrapped 2009, a sidewheel paddleboat
  - Huron
  - Great Western
- Canadian Pacific
  - Michigan
  - Ontario
- Grand Trunk
- Michigan Central
  - Transport (built 1880)
  - Transfer (1873)
  - Transfer II
  - Detroit
- Wabash Railroad, later Norfolk Southern purchased three ferries from Michigan Central in 1910 when the Michigan Central tunnel opened. The service continued until April 30, 1994.
  - Transport (built 1880), in use until 1933
  - Transfer II, in use until 1938
  - Detroit
  - Manitowoc (built 1926)
  - Windsor (1930)

==== Grosse Ile to Gordon, Ontario rail ferry ====
- Ferry from Grosse Ile to Gordon, Ontario between 1873 and 1888 on the Canada Southern Railway, later Michigan Central

=== Lake Erie ===
- Michigan-Ohio Navigation Company
  - SS Aquarama, (built 1945), in use 1957–62, Detroit to Cleveland, Ohio, 2,500 passengers and 160 automobiles
- Detroit-Atlantic Navigation Company of Detroit, MI.
  - MV Jack Dalton, the former Michigan state ferry Vacationland, was used briefly in the summer of 1960 to ship truck trailers in "fishyback" service between Detroit and Cleveland, OH. The venture quickly proved uneconomical and the service was suspended within 90 days of inauguration. Michigan seized the ferry for non-payment and resold the ship for use off lakes.
