= Vacationland (Great Lakes ferry) =

Automobile ferry used in Michigan's Straits of Mackinac

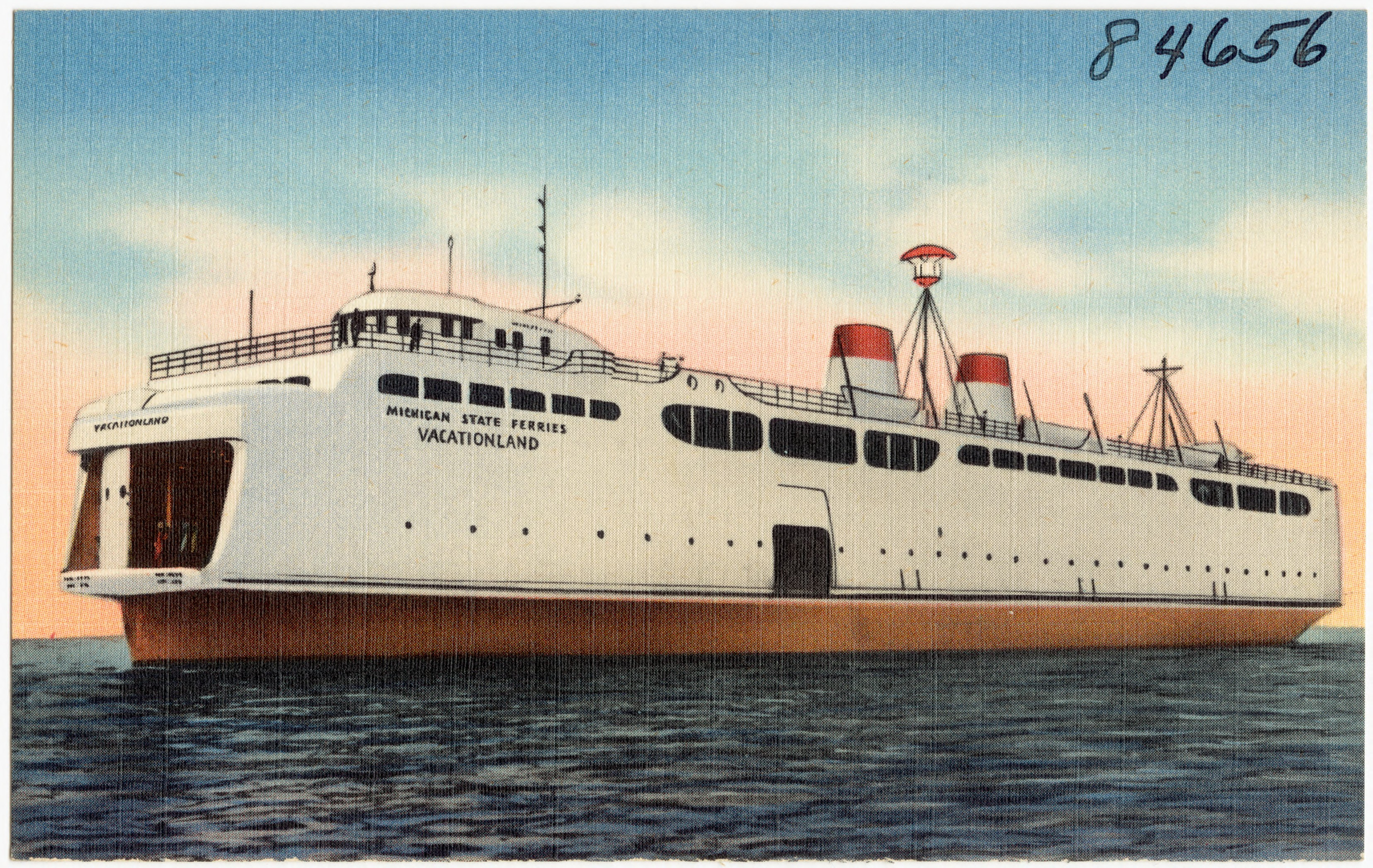
- Vacationland pictured on a Tichnor Brothers postcard

History
- Name: Vacationland; Jack Dalton (1960–1961); Père Nouvel (1961–1967); Sunshine Coast Queen (1967–1977); Gulf Kanayak (1977−)
- Owner: Michigan Department of Highways; Detroit Atlantic Navigation Company (1960–1961); Compagnie de Navigation Nord-Sud (1961–1967); BC Ferries (1967–1977)
- Ordered: 1949
- Builder: Great Lakes Engineering Works
- Cost: $4,745,000
- Yard number: 296
- Launched: 1951
- Sponsored by: Barbara Ann Ziegler
- Christened: 1951
- Completed: 1952
- Identification: IMO number: 5428568
- Fate: Sank under tow December 3, 1987

General characteristics
- Type: Auto Ferry
- Length: 360 ft (110 m)
- Beam: 75 ft (23 m)
- Draft: 16–18 ft (4.9–5.5 m)
- Deck clearance: 14 ft 6 in (4.42 m)
- Installed power: 4 × Nordberg direct drive diesel engines
- Capacity: 150 automobiles, 600 passengers
- Crew: 47

Vacationland was an American double-ended automobile ferry, built by Great Lakes Engineering Works for the Michigan State Highway Department. She was built to operate the route from St. Ignace to Mackinaw City through the Straits of Mackinac year-round, and was equipped with powerful engines and a reinforced hull to break through heavy ice. Vacationland was launched in 1951, and entered service in 1952. She was the final ferry built for the St. Ignace–Mackinaw City service, which was replaced by the Mackinac Bridge in 1957.

Following the opening of the Mackinac Bridge in 1957, the Vacationland was laid up until 1960, when she was sold to a private operator on Lake Erie as the Jack Dalton. She was repossessed by the State of Michigan for nonpayment shortly afterwards, and in 1961 she began service on the St. Lawrence River as the Père Nouvel, inaugurating a popular route between Baie-Comeau and Pointe-au-Père, Quebec.

In 1967, she was sold to BC Ferries in British Columbia and renamed the Sunshine Coast Queen. She was the first double-ended ferry in the BC Ferries fleet, a design that the service adopted for all new ferries after her. High operating costs and rising fuel prices forced BC Ferries to retire the vessel, affectionately known as the "Susy Q," in 1977. A private firm purchased her and renamed her the Gulf Kanayak, hoping to use her as an oil drilling support ship in Alaska. The venture failed, and she was sold for scrap. On December 3, 1987, while under tow to a scrapyard in China, she sank in the Pacific Ocean with no loss of life.

== Predecessors ==
The Michigan State Highway Department began operating an auto ferry service across the Straits of Mackinac in 1923, using the Ariel, a 95-foot (29 m) ferry converted to carry 20 automobiles. The service supplemented the expensive and irregularly scheduled automobile service of the existing Mackinac Transportation Company railroad ferries across the Straits, and proved popular in its first year. The service grew rapidly, with the acquisition of multiple secondhand automobile and railroad ferries from other operators on the Great Lakes. The service initially operated during the summer only, with regular winter service beginning in 1936. The winter service used the Sainte Marie (II), a railroad icebreaker leased by the State Highway Department.

At the 25th anniversary celebration of the Straits ferry service in 1948, the Highway Department showed a model of its proposed new vessel. The new ferry was to be the largest in the fleet, and would be equipped with a strengthened hull and powerful engines for year-round service.

== Construction and specifications ==
Vacationland was built by Great Lakes Engineering Works in River Rouge, Michigan, at a cost of $4,745,000. She was designed by Prof. L. A. Baier of the University of Michigan's Marine Engineering Department, in conjunction with H. M. Varian, superintendent of Great Lakes Engineering Works. The vessel was powered by 4 Nordberg direct-drive diesel engines, each connected to a propeller through a Westinghouse electro-magnetic coupling, generating a total of 9,360 shaft horsepower (6,980 kW).

Vacationland's keel was laid in May 1950. She was launched in April 1951, christened by 14-year-old Barbara Ziegler, the daughter of Michigan Highway Commissioner Charles M. Ziegler. Vacationland was the last ship built for the Highway Department ferry operation. She was designed to carry 150 automobiles, to relieve heavy traffic congestion at the Straits during the summer season, and also to serve as an icebreaker during winter months to keep the route open all year.

A "double-ender" capable of operating equally well in either forward or reverse, Vacationland was 360 feet (110 m) long, 75 feet (23 m) wide, and had room for 650 passengers in observation lounges at either end of her spar deck. The autos were carried below on a fully enclosed car deck. She operated with a crew of 47, who worked three shifts throughout the year. Her captain for most of her Michigan service was Frank U. Nelson.

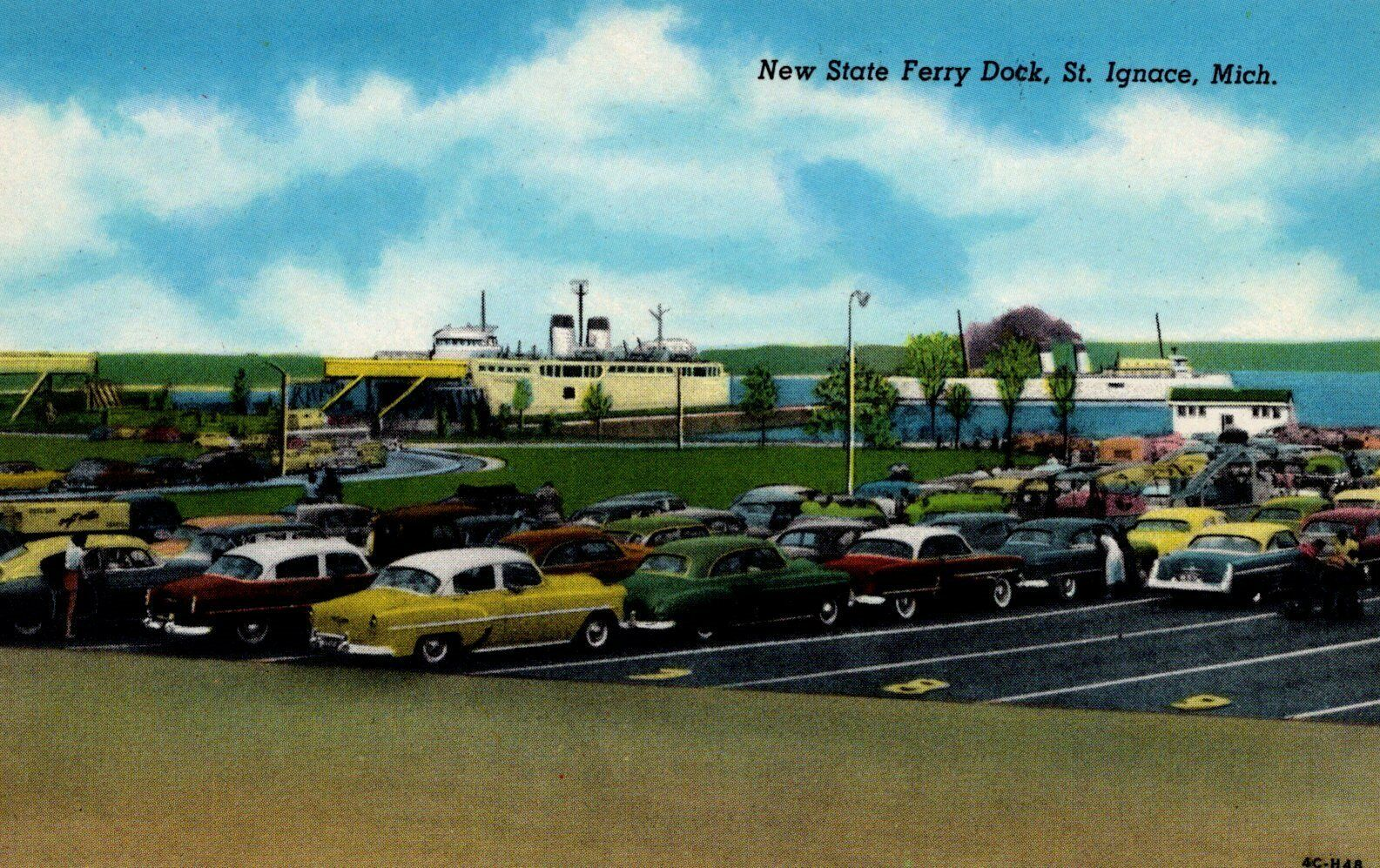
Postcard of the new state ferry docks in St. Ignace, c. 1952

To operate Vacationland, the Michigan State Highway Department built new infrastructure on both sides of the Straits. A new slip was constructed at the existing docks in Mackinaw City, and a new dock was built in St. Ignace, connected to US-2 by the short M-122 highway.

== Service history ==
=== Straits of Mackinac ===
Vacationland made her first trip across the Straits of Mackinac on January 13, 1952, and was praised for her speed and capability. She could complete the trip between St. Ignace and Mackinaw City in 29 minutes in clear waters, a new record.

When the Vacationland entered service, the state of Michigan was already planning her replacement. The Mackinac Bridge Authority was formed in 1950 to construct a bridge over the Straits of Mackinac, and bonds for the bridge's construction were issued. Construction on the Mackinac Bridge began in 1954, promising an even faster and higher-capacity link across the Straits of Mackinac. Vacationland made the last official Michigan State Ferry crossing of the Straits of Mackinac on November 1, 1957, with a VIP cruise as part of the bridge opening ceremonies.

In 1960 she was sold to the Detroit Atlantic Navigation Company of Detroit, and was renamed Jack Dalton. That operation, carrying truck trailers between Detroit and Cleveland, was short-lived, and Michigan took her back for non-payment.

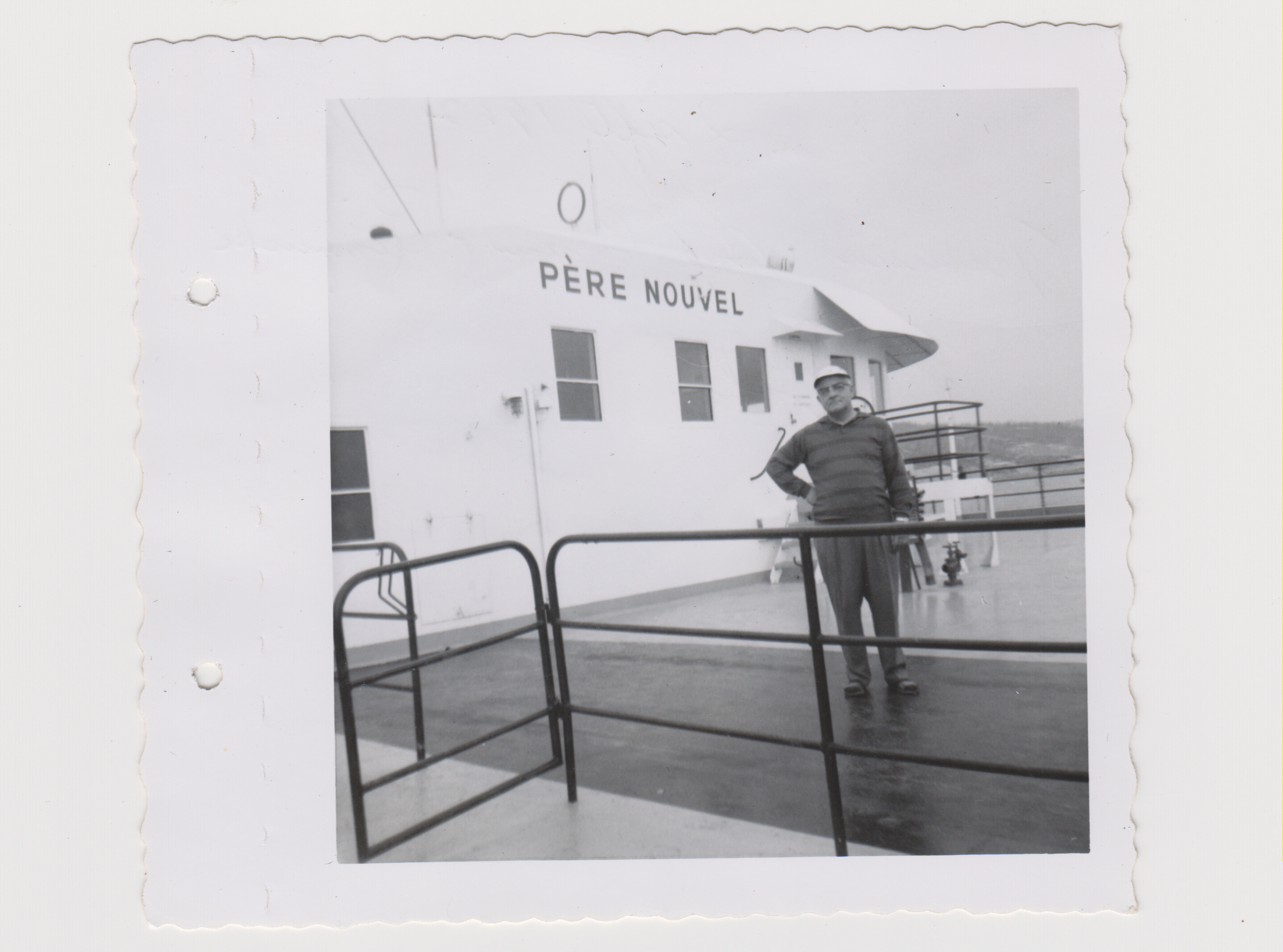
The deck of the Père Nouvel, 1962

=== St. Lawrence River ===
She was sold next to Canadian operators, Compagnie de Navigation Nord-Sud, (North-South Navigation Company) on the St. Lawrence River. She operated between Pointe-au-Père (Rimouski) and Baie-Comeau from 1961 to 1966 as the Père Nouvel. As such, she was modified to include a cafeteria and bar/lounge in one observation room. The service inaugurated the first crossing of the eastern St. Lawrence River and was very popular.

=== British Columbia ===
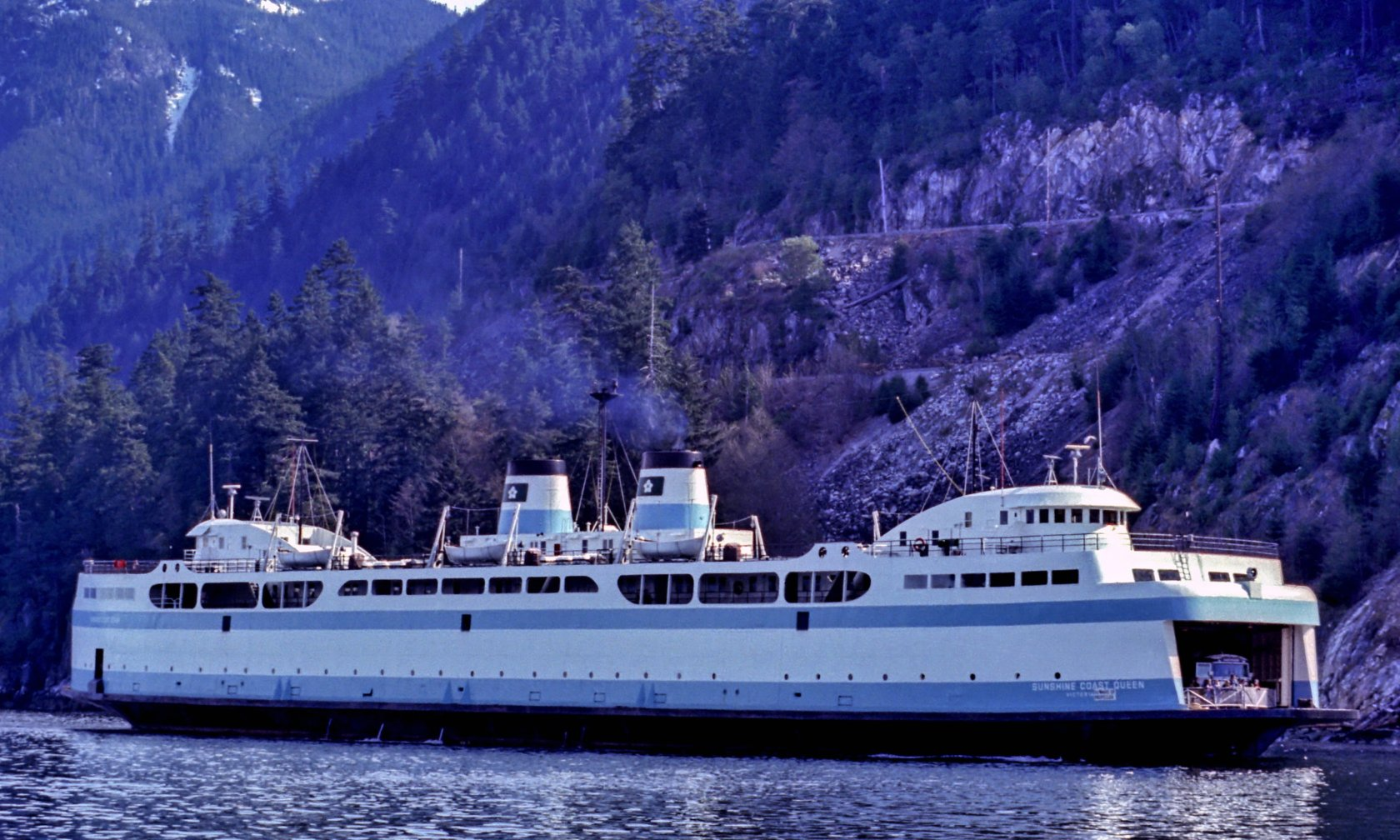
Sunshine Coast Queen in BC Ferries service, 1975

In 1967 she was sold again to BC Ferries, of Victoria, British Columbia. They sailed the ship through the Panama Canal to Victoria and renamed the ferry as the Sunshine Coast Queen. BC Ferries modified her for their needs, lengthening her to carry 725 passengers and 175 cars. She was assigned to the Langdale–Horseshoe Bay route, and entered service on May 17, 1968. The Sunshine Coast Queen, nicknamed the "Susy Q," was the first double-ended ferry in the BC Ferries fleet.

== Retirement and sinking ==
BC Ferries retired the Sunshine Coast Queen due to increasing traffic and high operating costs in 1977 after the first Arab oil embargo, and she was again laid up. Sold to Canaarctic Ventures, the company planned to convert the ferry to an oil-drilling support ship on Alaska's North Slope as the Gulf Kanayak. The oil embargo ended, however, and the ferry remained laid up until 1987. She was sold for scrap to a Chinese company, and was scheduled to be towed across the Pacific Ocean.

While en route to China, the Gulf Kanayak sank while under tow of the tugboat Hoshin #8 on December 3, 1987, with no loss of life. The wreck lies in about 12,000 feet (3,700 m) of water in the Pacific Ocean, nearly 100 miles (160 km) off the mouth of the Columbia River.

== See also ==
- Ferries in Michigan
