= SS Chief Wawatam =

Steel ship based in Michigan

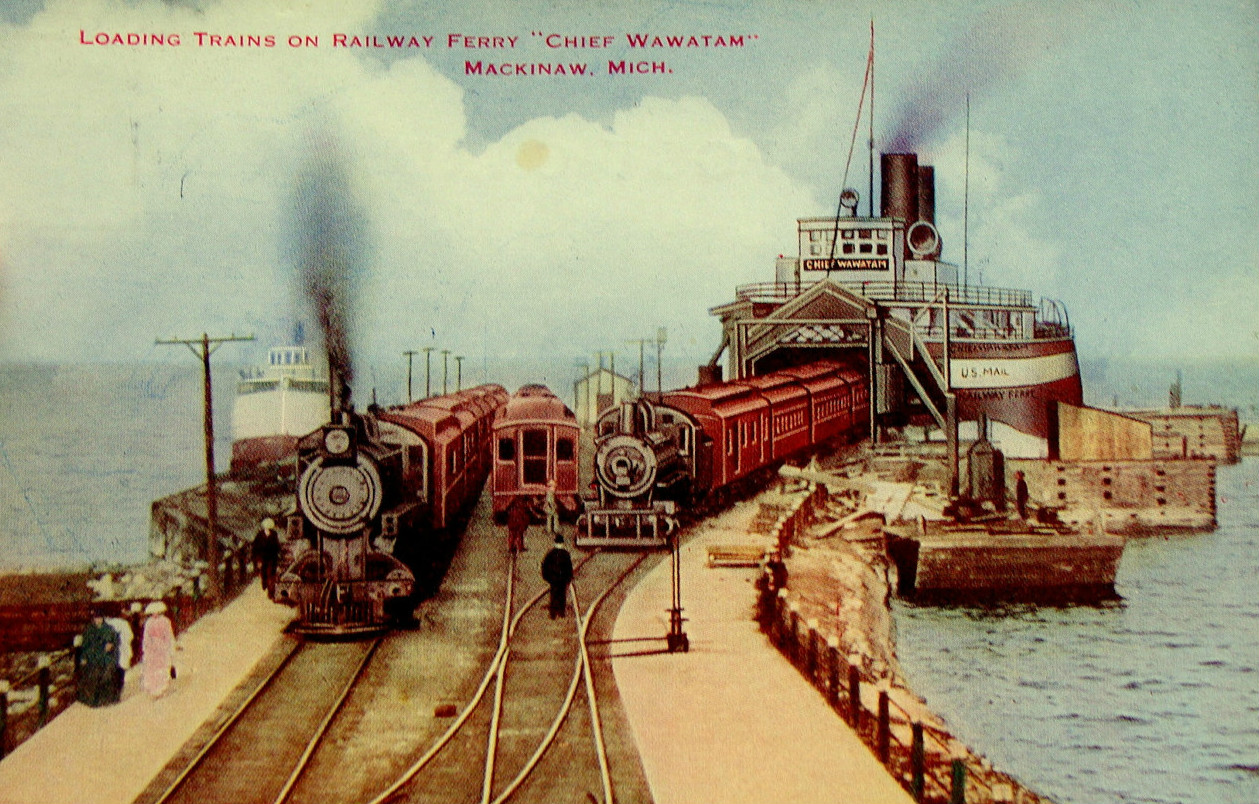
- SS Chief Wawatam loading a passenger train at Mackinaw City

History
- Name: SS Chief Wawatam
- Namesake: Chief Wawatam
- Operator: Mackinac Transportation Company
- Route: Mackinaw City to St. Ignace, Michigan
- Builder: Toledo Shipbuilding Company
- Cost: $400,000
- Yard number: Hull number 119
- Launched: August 26, 1911
- In service: October 1911
- Out of service: 1984
- Identification: Official Number 209235; IMO number: 5070115
- Nickname(s): the Chief
- Fate: Cut down to barge in 1989; scrapped 2009 by Purvis Marine

General characteristics
- Tonnage: 2,990 tons
- Length: 338 ft (103.02 m)
- Beam: 62 ft (18.90 m)
- Installed power: Six hand-fired, coal-burning steam boilers,
- Propulsion: three triple-expansion steam engines, total 4,500 hp (3.36 MW). Three propellers: one forward, two aft
- Capacity: 26 freight cars on three tracks

Chief Wawatam (nicknamed the Chief) was a coal-fired steel ship in operation on the Great Lakes from 1911 to 1984. It was cut down into a barge by new owners in 1989, and scrapped in 2009.

For most of its working life, the vessel was based in St. Ignace, Michigan. It was named after a distinguished Ojibwa chief of the 1760s. In initial revenue service, the Chief Wawatam served as a train ferry, passenger ferry and icebreaker that operated year-round at the Straits of Mackinac between St. Ignace and Mackinaw City, Michigan. During the winter months, it sometimes took many hours to cross the five-mile-wide Straits, and Chief Wawatam was fitted with complete passenger hospitality spaces.

Chief Wawatam's work began to change in the 1940s. Its role as an icebreaker stationed in the upper Great Lakes was supplanted in 1944 by USCGC Mackinaw, a U.S. Coast Guard icebreaker. The ship's passenger traffic dropped off in the years following World War II. The remaining passenger service ended with the completion of the Mackinac Bridge in 1957 that connected the Upper and Lower peninsulas of the U.S. state of Michigan.

Chief Wawatam was then used exclusively as a railroad ferry shuttling freight cars across the Straits. It was taken out of service in 1985, and a 1989 sold to Purvis Marine, Ltd., of Sault Ste. Marie Ontario.

The two railroad docks that were used in Mackinaw City and in St. Ignace survive. USCGC Mackinaw, now a ship museum, is berthed at the railroad dock in Mackinaw City and a wooden statue of its namesake stands nearby at its harbor. The Wawatam Lighthouse guards the railroad dock at St. Ignace.

== History ==
=== Railroad ferry ===
Chief Wawatam was designed by Great Lakes marine architect Frank E. Kirby. It was launched in Toledo, Ohio, by the Toledo Shipbuilding Company on 26 August 1911. It was a replacement for St. Ignace, a wooden vessel built in 1888. The new steel ship, at the time of construction, was said to have been the largest ice crusher in the world. It started servicing the Mackinac Transportation Company on 18 October 1911. The company was a joint venture of Duluth, South Shore and Atlantic Railway, Grand Rapids and Indiana Railroad, and Michigan Central Railroad. The three railroads crossed back and forth at the Straits of Mackinac.

Straits of Mackinac ice

Depending on their size, Chief Wawatam could carry 18 to 26 railroad cars, rolled onto rails bolted to the ship's deck. The vessel had similarly designed steam engines as the Titanic. After a post-1945 refit, it would have a steering gear taken from a World War II destroyer. The first part of Chief Wawatam's history is that while its main purpose was as a train service to carry railroad cars, it also carried regular passenger train cars, automobiles, military personnel, and people for cruising. The cruising passengers had a lounge with oak seats. The ship's name was often shortened to just the Chief in common usage.

Year-round train ferry service at the Straits of Mackinac was a significant challenge because of the heavy ice buildup experienced by these straits in winter. Chief Wawatam was designed to break ice with her bow propeller, which could both propel the boat and take water out from underneath the ice to allow it to be broken through by force of gravity from the weight of the ship. The ice-crushing railroad ferry was used in various instances to break open a channel for other freighters to pass through.

Chief Wawatam was 338 feet in length and had a beam of 62 feet. Her three propellers, two in the stern and one on the bow, were driven by coal-fired triple-expansion steam engines producing 6,000 horsepower. The vessel is believed to have been the last hand-fired, coal-burning boat in commercial service on the Great Lakes. Other coal-burning vessels that survived longer in revenue service, such as the ferry Badger, had automatic stokers.

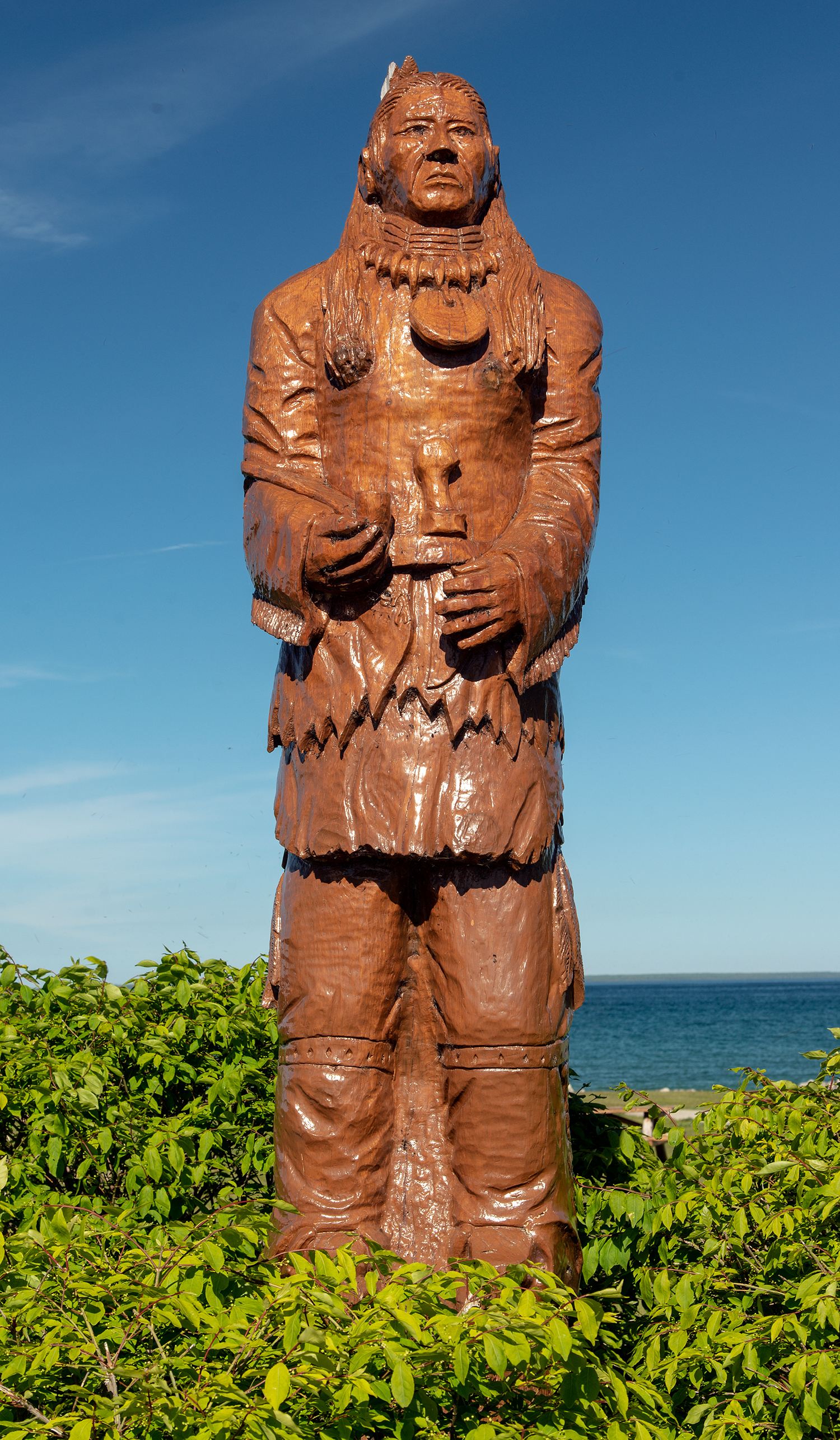
Ojibwa Chief Wawatam statue in Mackinaw City.

=== Name ===
The vessel was originally called Hull Number 119 but was soon thereafter named for Chief Wawatam, an Ojibwa chief of the 1700s who, in the Ojibwa fighting outbreak at Fort Michilimackinac in 1763, rescued the Englishman fur trader Alexander Henry. In 1761, Henry had been the first English-speaking fur trader to establish himself as a merchant at Michilimackinac. At that time Henry became a close friend and kinship relation of a Chippewa chief named Wa'wa'tam, and Henry later claimed that he and Wawatam had become blood brothers by the power of the Great Spirit. This gave Chief Wawatam an enduring place in Straits of Mackinac folklore. A wooden statue of Chief Wawatam stands near the harbor in Mackinaw City, Michigan, in Wawatam Park. It was carved by Jerry Prior from a white pine log that was a hundred years old.

Objective historical records partly confirm Henry's story. After initial cordialities in 1761–1762 between the British and the local tribe of Chippewa, relations had deteriorated sharply in 1763. The change was associated with anti-British organizational work among the Native Americans, led by the Odawa war leader Pontiac in southeastern Michigan. On June 2, 1763, as part of the larger conflict with the British Army, a group of Indians staged a ruse to gain entrance to the fort. Upon entering the fort the Chippewa killed most of the British soldiers and fur traders. Fur trader Henry had developed a kinship relationship with Wawatam during the 1761–1762 truce, and even as the fort fell Wawatam retained his rights and responsibilities as a kin. Henry found himself secreted in a Mackinac Island limestone hollow, Skull Cave, as an uncomfortable but safe fugitive. Henry later paid tribute to his rescuer in his published memoirs, leading to Wawatam's elevation as a legendary figure in the Straits of Mackinac.

== Life of the crew ==
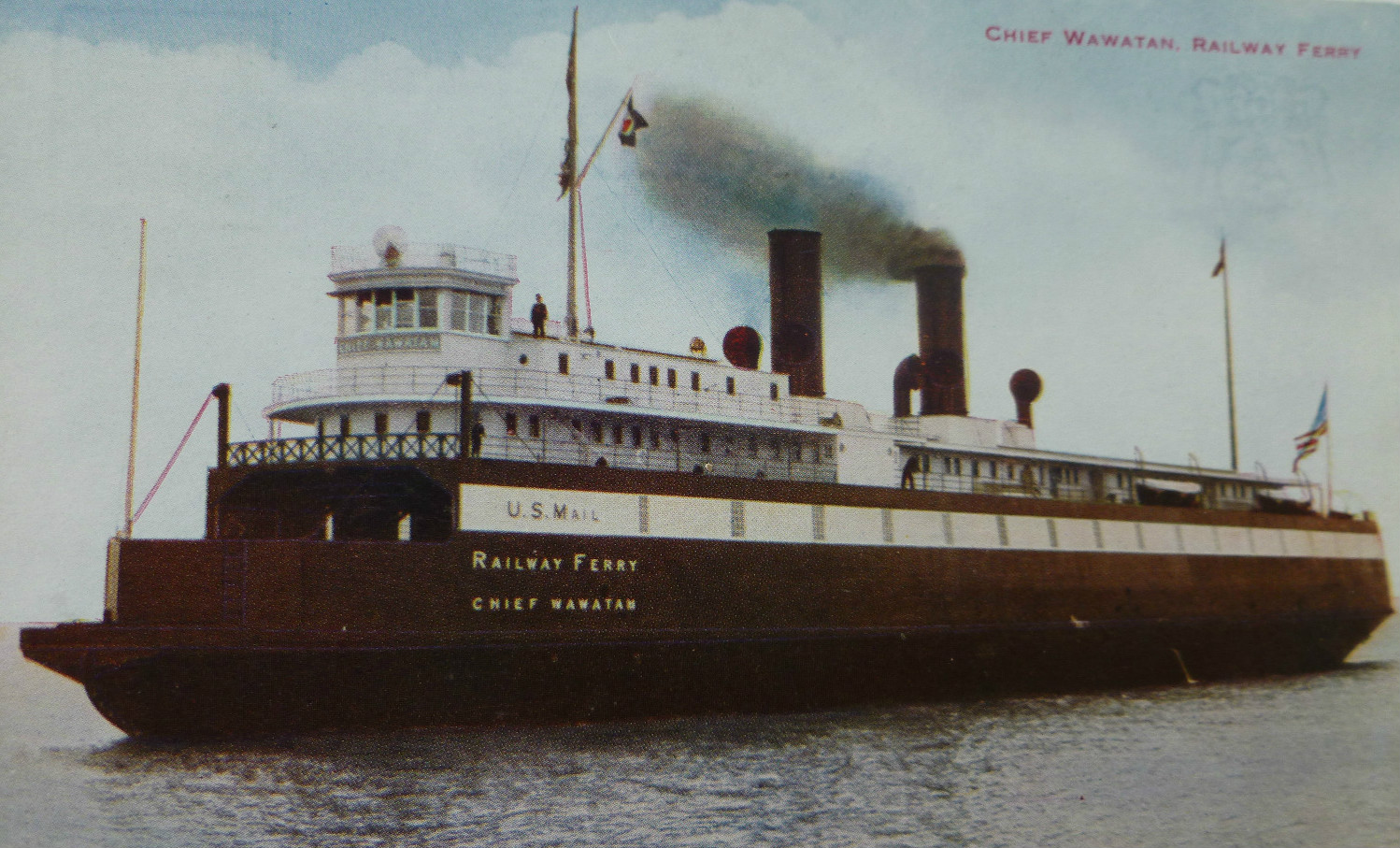
SS Chief Wawatam from a 1912 Toledo Shipbuilding advertisement.

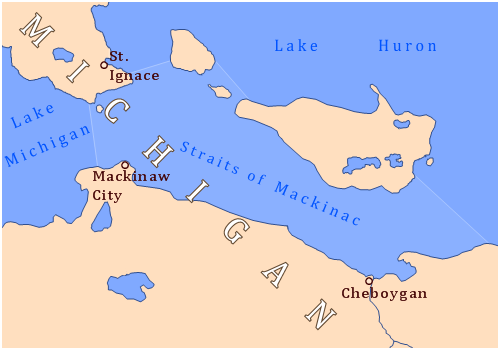
Straits of Mackinac map

=== Crew quarters ===
Chief Wawatam's could carry up to 348 passengers and had a hotel services staff of 30 in addition to the crew of 24 that operated the vessel. It had a crew quarters that consisted of bunk beds stacked four high, later reduced to two. The officers had their own quarters.

=== Eating area ===
During the height of Chief Wawatam's passenger history the vessel had maids, cooks, and porters. The main eating galley was closed in 1966 and the normal meals then came from home in lunch buckets. There were two eating areas for the crew and a separate dining room for the ship's captain and his officers. The food prepared in all three eating areas was the same daily, however the service in the dining room was better. The main meal of the day was at noon. An experienced cook had to bake the pies before the boat was loaded on the back and forth trips.

=== Crew ===
Most of the crew of Chief Wawatam were from the city of St. Ignace in the Upper Peninsula of Michigan. They knew each other as local residents and close friends. During times of distress and illness they would cover each other's work time.

== Fate ==
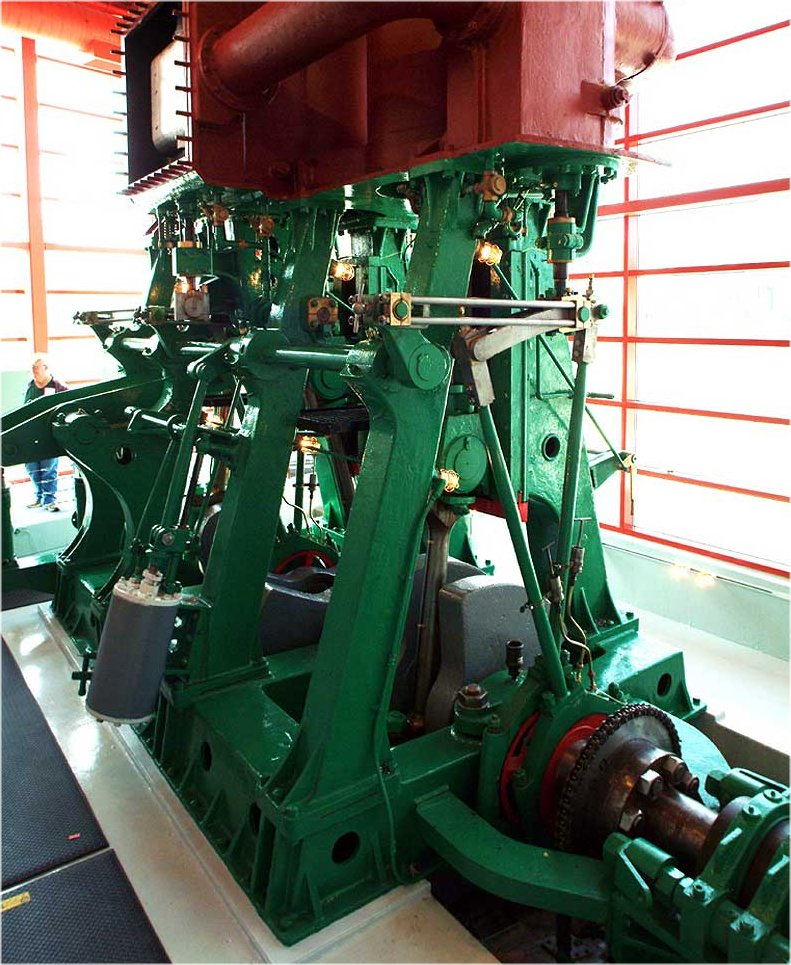
Chief Wawatam triple-expansion engine displayed at the Wisconsin Maritime Museum

Chief Wawatam was the only railroad connection between the two peninsulas of Michigan and transported across the Straits of Mackinac over 30,000 railroad cars per year in the 1950s. The carrier was also used to move freight supplies and automobiles across the Straits during its first fifty years of service. The vessel's business began to change during the 1940s. In 1944, USCGC Mackinaw, a U.S. Coast Guard icebreaker powered by diesel engines, supplanted the previously vital service of Chief Wawatam as an icebreaker stationed in the upper Great Lakes.

Passenger train ticket sales declined in the years following World War II and the use of Chief Wawatam for passenger service dwindled. With the completion of the I-75 Mackinac Bridge in 1957, remaining passenger train service ended. Chief Wawatam entered upon the final phase of its initial revenue services, being exclusively used then to shuttle railroad freight cars across the Straits. This service ended in 1984, when Chief Wawatam was laid up for four years in Mackinaw City. The ship was then sold to Purvis Marine Ltd for $110,000, refusing less money from others who wanted to turn it into a tourist attraction. It was taken to Sault Ste. Marie, Ontario, in 1989 and broken down to serve as a barge.

It was reported at the end of 2009 that Chief Wawatam barge was being scrapped. One of the ship's triple-expansion engines was saved and after being restored to operating condition was placed on display at Wisconsin Maritime Museum in Manitowoc, Wisconsin. Other artifacts from the ferry, including the whistle, wheel, telegraphs, and furniture are preserved by Mackinac Island State Park Commission in Mackinaw City. The original vessel was part of one of the last survivor ships of the Great Storm of 1913.

== Legacy ==
- Chief Wawatam was added to the Michigan Register of Historic Sites in 1981.
- Wawatam Park, located next to the marina in St. Ignace, Michigan is named for Chief Wawatam and its Odawa namesake.
- Wawatam Lighthouse, a 52 ft (16 m) octagonal structure with lantern and gallery erected in St. Ignace, Michigan, in 2006 at the far end of the former railroad ferry pier used by Chief Wawatam.

== See also ==
- Old Mackinac Point Light
- USCGC Mackinaw (WAGB-83)
- Wawatam, the ship's Odawa Indian namesake
- Wawatam Lighthouse

== Sources ==
- Burgtorf, Frances D. (1976). Chief Wawatam: story of hand-bomber. Petoskey. OCLC 602549900.
- Hilton, George W. (2011). Great Lakes Car Ferries. Smashwords. ISBN 978-0-9658624-5-5.
- Fleet, J. (2011). Old and New Mackinac. Applewood Books. ISBN 978-1-4290-4565-0.
