= Mackinac Transportation Company =

The Mackinac Transportation Company was a train ferry service that shuttled railroad cars across the Straits of Mackinac from 1881 until 1984. It was best known as the owner and operator, from 1911 until 1984, of the SS Chief Wawatam, an icebreaking train ferry.

== History ==
=== First decades ===
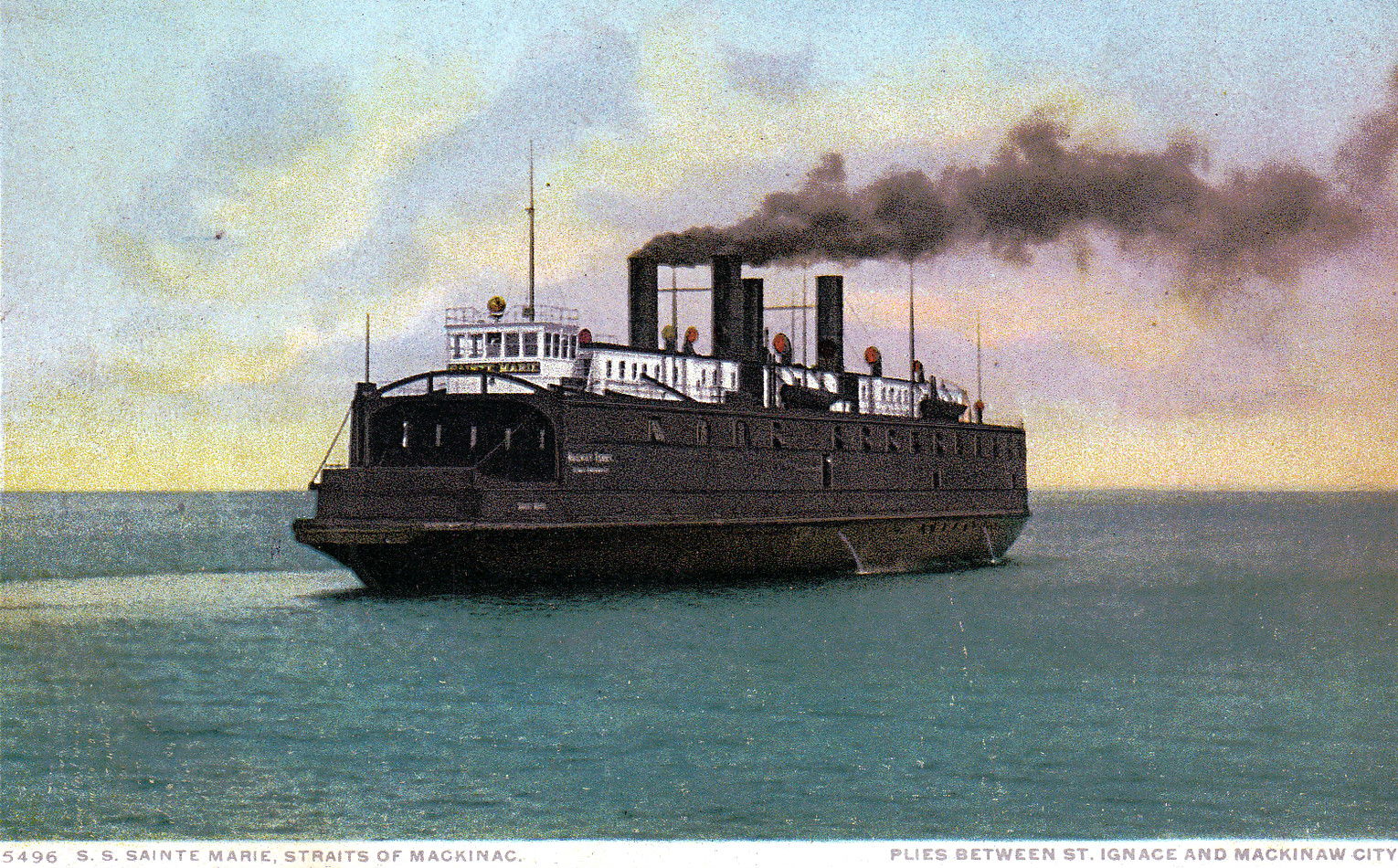
The first SS Sainte Marie, which was retired in 1911.

The Mackinac Transportation Company (MTC) was a joint venture founded in 1881 by three separate railroads, the Detroit, Mackinac and Marquette Railroad, the Grand Rapids and Indiana Railroad, and the Michigan Central, to create a twelve-month service to connect their three railheads located in Mackinaw City, Michigan and St. Ignace, Michigan.

The company purchased its first vessel, the steamship SS Algomah, and due to heavy copper traffic, which was difficult to transship from train to ship in barrels, shortly thereafter purchased a barge named Betsy able to carry four railcars when towed by Algomah. However, the open barge had too little capacity, subjected crews to inclement weather, and Algomah was too light to break ice effectively while towing the barge. There was also the danger that the barge could overtake the ferry if she was suddenly stopped while breaking ice.

That led MTC to order a purpose built icebreaking rail ferry named SS St. Ignace from the Detroit Dry Dock Company in 1887. St. Ignace was built with a propeller at her bow to break ice ahead of the hull, and entered service in April 1888. Her capacity of ten railcars proved to still be inadequate for traffic, and a similar, albeit larger, vessel named SS Sainte Marie with a capacity of eighteen railcars entered service in June 1893.

=== Chief Wawatam era ===
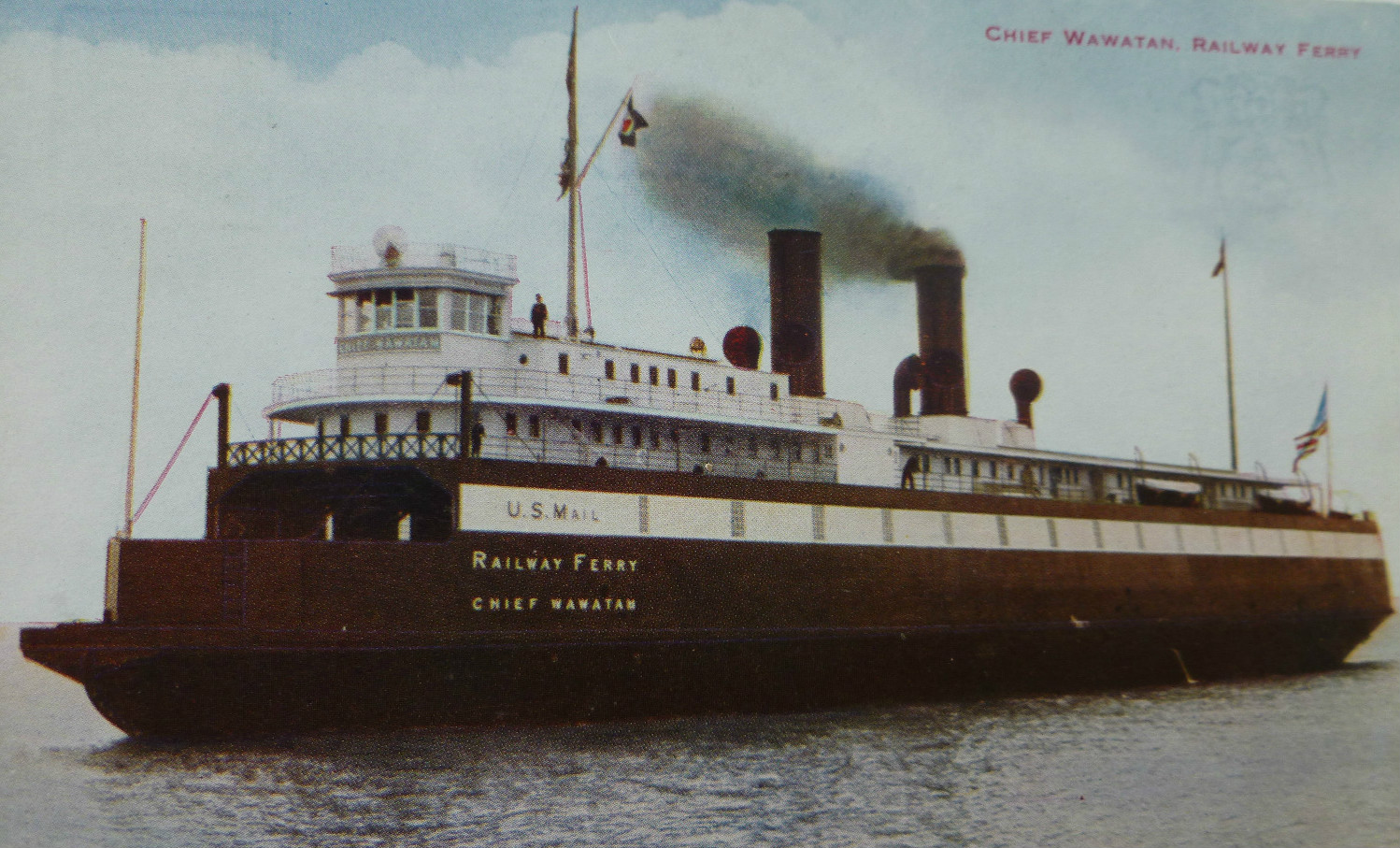
SS Chief Wawatam, which entered service in 1911 to replace the first Sainte Marie.

In 1895, Algomah was sold to the Island Transportation Company, which served Mackinac Island. In June 1902, St. Ignace sank at dock in St. Ignace, but was refloated and returned to service. In October 1911, the company's largest and first steel-hulled vessel, the 26-railcar SS Chief Wawatam, entered service. She replaced Sainte Marie, which was sold and converted to a barge, in which capacity she operated until 1927. A second Sainte Marie, equipped with her namesake's engines, was delivered in March 1913, whereupon St. Ignace was sold; after several years of icebreaking service she caught fire and was cut down to a barge until her eventual disposal in 1930.

In 1916, MTC began carrying automobile traffic, with vehicles loaded onto railcars for the passage. This arrangement limited capacity, and combined with high rates led to public dissatisfaction that eventually culminated in 1923 in the introduction of state-run car ferries across the strait. For several decades, the state ferries operated only during the summer months, and beginning in 1936 chartered an MTC vessel to provide winter service; this arrangement lasted until 1952, when the icebreaker Vacationland entered service in the state's fleet.

As rail passenger traffic across the straits declined, and eventually ended in August 1955 with the departure of the last Northbound passenger train from Mackinaw City, an increasingly important source of revenue for the company was chartering vessels for icebreaking service. Even so, this was insufficient to justify the ownership of two vessels, with Saint Marie operating only in charter icebreaking, and she was therefore sold for scrap in 1961.

Following the opening of the Mackinac Bridge in 1957, MTC was losing at least $100,000 annually by the early 1960s. In 1963, the company applied to terminate ferry service but was denied by the Interstate Commerce Commission (ICC). After repeated attempts, the ICC granted permission to end operations in 1976, but the state of Michigan chose to subsidize the company in order to continue service. Chief Wawatam continued to operate until August 1984, when a wall collapsed at the St. Ignace dock, making it unusable. The ship was laid up awaiting a decision from the state regarding the future of the service, until in 1986 the Soo Line Railroad abandoned the unused railroad to the St. Ignace docks—shortly thereafter the tracks to the Mackinaw City were also removed and Chief Wawatam was sold in 1988 for conversion into a barge.

== See also ==
- Ferries in Michigan
