= Detroit, Mackinac and Marquette Railroad =

The Detroit, Mackinac and Marquette Railroad was a land grant railroad that was built and operated briefly (1881–1886) in the Upper Peninsula of the U.S. state of Michigan. Incorporated in 1879, the 151.9-mile (244.5 km)-long railroad began operations in 1881. It was intended to help the economic development of a region of frontier timberland along the shores of Lake Michigan and Lake Superior. Its successor line was the Duluth, South Shore and Atlantic Railway.

== History ==
The Detroit, Mackinac and Marquette (DM&M) Railroad was built in 1879–1881 by Detroit businessman James McMillan, Francis Palms, and their venture-capital partners. Unlike many U.S. railroads, the Detroit, Mackinac and Marquette was built from west to east. Its main line stretched from its namesake city, Marquette, Michigan, to the Straits of Mackinac at St. Ignace, Michigan. The railroad itself did not reach Detroit, but offered service thither through its part ownership of the Mackinac Transportation Company, a railroad car ferry service that shuttled railroad cars across the Straits of Mackinac to the DM&M's partner lines in Mackinaw City, Michigan.

Despite being the recipient of 1,327,042 acres (5,370.35 km^{2}) of Upper Peninsula real estate, the Detroit, Mackinac and Marquette was not a financial success. It declared bankruptcy in summer 1886, and was allowed by its creditors to continue business under the temporary name of the Mackinaw and Marquette Railroad. In the foreclosure sale October 1886, the bankrupt railroad and its assets were sold to the McMillan family for $1.05 million. In December of the same year, the McMillan interests folded the Mackinaw and Marquette Railroad into the consolidated Duluth, South Shore and Atlantic Railway. The former DM&M main line became a key component of the new Upper Peninsula railroad.

Although the 1886 bankruptcy meant that the Detroit, Mackinac and Marquette Railroad's common shareholders lost their entire investment, the reputation of company president James McMillan does not appear to have suffered thereby. In 1889 the Michigan legislature elected him to the United States Senate.

== Today ==
While the Detroit, Mackinac and Marquette Railroad did not survive very long, several of its owners and their friends immortalized themselves on the map of Michigan. McMillan's friend and DM&M partner John Stoughton Newberry gave his name to the future county seat of Newberry, Michigan, and twenty-five miles to the west, the town of Seney, Michigan and the later Seney National Wildlife Refuge recall the name of DM&M partner George I. Seney.
