= National Register of Historic Places listings in Cheboygan County, Michigan =

Location of Cheboygan County in Michigan

This is a list of the National Register of Historic Places listings in Cheboygan County, Michigan.

This is intended to be a complete list of the properties and districts on the National Register of Historic Places in Cheboygan County, Michigan, United States. Latitude and longitude coordinates are provided for many National Register properties and districts; these locations may be seen together in a map.

There are 10 properties and districts listed on the National Register in the county.

This National Park Service list is complete through NPS recent listings posted September 26, 2025.

| | Name on the Register | Image | Date listed | Location | City or town | Description |
|---|---|---|---|---|---|---|
| 1 | Campbell Farm Site | Campbell Farm Site | January 31, 1978 (#78001496) | On US-23, 4 mi SE; 45°44′42″N 84°40′12″W | Mackinaw City, Michigan | The Campbell Site, also known as the Mill Creek Site, is the location of a saw mill and dam constructed in about 1790 to supply lumber to the frontier settlement of Mackinac Island. The site was abandoned in 1839, and is now the location of the Historic Mill Creek State Park. |
| 2 | Cheboygan Bascule Bridge | Cheboygan Bascule Bridge | December 9, 1999 (#99001509) | US 23 over the Cheboygan River; 45°38′45″N 84°28′22″W | Cheboygan | The Cheboygan Bascule Bridge is a double-leaf bascule bridge built in 1940 to replace an aging swing bridge built in 1877. It was the last bascule bridge constructed in the state of Michigan prior to the end of World War II. |
| 3 | Cheboygan County Courthouse | Cheboygan County Courthouse | May 8, 1986 (#86001010) | 229 Court St. 45°38′22″N 84°28′56″W | Cheboygan | The Old Cheboygan County Courthouse was constructed in 1869 for $3000. The building served as a courthouse until 1899, when the county built a new courthouse. It was adapted for use as offices, and houses a law office. |
| 4 | Faunce-McMichael Farm | Faunce-McMichael Farm | May 31, 1990 (#90000801) | 11126 M-68; 45°26′34″N 84°42′48″W | Burt Lake | The Faunce-McMichael Farm was owned by two American pioneering families: Ezra Faunce first homesteaded this property beginning in 1875. In 1895, James McMichael purchased the farm from the Faunce family. The historic farmhouse has been demolished. |
| 5 | Fourteen Foot Shoal Light Station | Fourteen Foot Shoal Light Station | July 27, 2005 (#05000742) | Northern Lake Huron, 2.2 mi (3.5 km) northeast of the mouth of the Cheboygan River; 45°40′48″N 84°26′06″W | Cheboygan | Construction on the Fourteen Foot Shoal Light began in 1929, and the light was first lit the next year. The United States Lighthouse Service intended from the time of design that this light would be automated (possibly the first such instance) and operated by radio control from the nearby Poe Reef Light. |
| 6 | Mackinac Point Lighthouse | Mackinac Point Lighthouse | October 1, 1969 (#69000068) | Fort Michilimackinac State Park; 45°47′15″N 84°43′46″W | Mackinaw City | The Old Mackinac Point Light was constructed in 1892 and deactivated in 1959 when the Mackinac Bridge was completed. It is now part of the Fort Michilimackinac State Park. |
| 7 | Newton-Allaire House | Newton-Allaire House | February 10, 1983 (#83000840) | 337 Dresser St. 45°38′47″N 84°28′44″W | Cheboygan | The Newton-Allaire House was built in 1871 by village president Archibald Newton as a wedding present for his second wife, Cornelia Allaire. The couple died childless, and passed the house to Cornelia's brother, Joseph Allaire Jr. The house has remained held by the Allaire family. |
| 8 | Poe Reef Light Station | Poe Reef Light Station | September 6, 2005 (#05000985) | Lake Huron, 2.6 mi (4.2 km) northwest of Cordwood Point; 45°41′41″N 84°21′44″W | Benton Township | Four different lightships served at Poe Reef beginning in 1893. Finally, in 1926, the decision was made to construct a permanent light at the location, and in 1928 this lighthouse was constructed. The reef and light are named for lighthouse designer Orlando M. Poe. |
| 9 | Spectacle Reef Light Station | Spectacle Reef Light Station | July 27, 2005 (#05000744) | Located in northern Lake Huron, 10.3 mi (16.6 km) north-northeast of Ninemile Point; 45°46′24″N 84°08′12″W | Benton Township | The Spectacle Reef Light was the most expensive lighthouse ever built on the Great Lakes. It is said to be the most spectacular engineering achievement in lighthouse construction on Lake Huron. Construction in the 1870s cost $406,000. |
| 10 | Forrest J. Stimpson House | Forrest J. Stimpson House | May 12, 1980 (#80001849) | 566 Trails End; 45°46′03″N 84°44′21″W | Mackinaw City | Forrest J. Stimpson constructed this house in 1882 at 516 N. Huron Blvd in Mackinaw City; he used it as a marine recording station, recording the passage of vessels through the straits. The house was moved to this new location. |

== See also ==
- List of Michigan State Historic Sites in Cheboygan County, Michigan
- National Register of Historic Places listings in Michigan
- Listings in neighboring counties: Charlevoix, Emmet, Mackinac, Otsego, Presque Isle
