= List of Michigan State Historic Sites in Cheboygan County =

Location of Cheboygan County in Michigan

The following is a list of Michigan State Historic Sites in Cheboygan County, Michigan. Sites marked with a dagger (†) are also listed on the National Register of Historic Places in Cheboygan County, Michigan.

== Current listings ==
Name	Image	Location	City	Listing date
Peter L. Brisbine House		7332 Argonaut Trail	Tuscarora Township	
Robert Campbell Mill	Old Mill Creek	9001 W, US-23	Mackinaw Township	March 20, 1984
Senator Calvin A. Campbell House		3526 S. Straits Hwy.	Indian River	January 18, 1980
Old Cheboygan County Courthouse†		229 Court Street	Cheboygan	1980
Cheboygan County Jail and Sheriff's Residence		310 Court St.	Cheboygan	July 15, 1999
Opera House (Cheboygan)		403 N. Huron Street	Cheboygan	July 26, 1974
Fort Michilimackinac State Park		Straits Avenue	Mackinaw City	2009
Inland Waterway Informational Designation		Burt Lake State Park, Old US-27, near I-75 and M-68	Indian River vicinity	January 19, 1957
Mackinac Point Lighthouse†		Fort Michilimackinac State Park, North Huron Ave	Mackinaw City	April 14, 1972
Michigan Central Railroad Depot		100 Railroad	Wolverine	December 20, 1989
Michigan State Ferry Dock / Michigan State Ferry System		321 Huron next to Conkling Heritage Park - Performance Shell	Mackinaw City	September 28, 2000
Newton-Allaire House†		337 Dresser Street	Cheboygan	October 23, 1979
Jacob J. Post House		528 South Huron	Cheboygan	February 16, 1989
SS Chief Wawatam (scrapped)		Dock off Huron Street in Mackinaw City	Mackinaw City	March 16, 1981
Saint Anthony's Catholic Church Rectory		210 Henry Street	Mackinaw City	August 3, 1979
Saint Mary's Catholic Church		120 North D Street	Cheboygan	March 16, 1981
Forrest J. Stimpson House†	Forrest J. Stimpson House	516 North Huron Boulevard	Mackinaw City	February 23, 1978
Village of Mackinaw City Informational Designation		Marina Park (Huron Avenue)	Mackinaw City	May 15, 1987
USCG Cutter Mackinaw WAGB 83 / Mackinac City Railroad Dock Informational Designation		321 Huron next to Conkling Heritage Park - Performance Shell	Mackinaw City	September 28, 2008

== See also ==
- National Register of Historic Places listings in Cheboygan County, Michigan

== Sources ==
- Historic Sites Online – Cheboygan County. Michigan State Housing Developmental Authority. Accessed January 23, 2011.
