= My World =

My World may refer to:

== Music ==
=== Albums ===
- My World (Bryn Christopher album), 2008
- My World (Cyndi Thomson album), 2001
- My World (Dyland & Lenny album), 2010
- My World (Emilia Rydberg album), 2009
- My World (Ray Charles album), 1993
- My World (Ron Artest album), 2006
- My World (Aespa EP), 2023
- My World (Justin Bieber EP), 2009
- Avril Lavigne: My World, 2003 DVD
- My World, a 1998 album by Angela Gheorghiu
- My World, a 1965 album by Eddy Arnold
- My World, a 1997 album by Trout Fishing in America

=== Songs ===
- "My World" (Another Bad Creation song), 1991
- "My World" (Avril Lavigne song), 2002
- "My World" (Bee Gees song), 1972
- "My World" (Chuckyy song), 2025
- "My World" (Guns N' Roses song), 1991
- "My World" (Sick Puppies song), 2007
- My World (Chuckyy song), 2025
- "My World", by 3 Doors Down from Seventeen Days, 2005
- "My World", by Asian Kung-Fu Generation from Sol-fa, 2004
- "My World", by Emigrate from Emigrate, 2007
- "My World", by Iggy Azalea from Ignorant Art, 2011
- "My World", by Kid Cudi from Man on the Moon: The End of Day, 2009
- "My World", by Metallica from St. Anger, 2003
- "My World", by Paul van Dyk from Global, 2003
- "My World", by Secret Affair, c. 1980
- "My World", by SR-71 from Tomorrow, 2001
- "My World", by Sublime with Rome from Yours Truly, 2011
- "My World", by Tech N9ne featuring Brotha Lynch Hung & Dalima, from Everready (The Religion), 2006

=== Tours ===
- My World Tour, the 2010 concert tour by Justin Bieber

== Other uses ==
- My World (book), a children's book by Margaret Wise Brown

== See also ==
- My World, My Way (disambiguation)
- Mi Mundo (disambiguation)
