= Cheboygan Bascule Bridge =

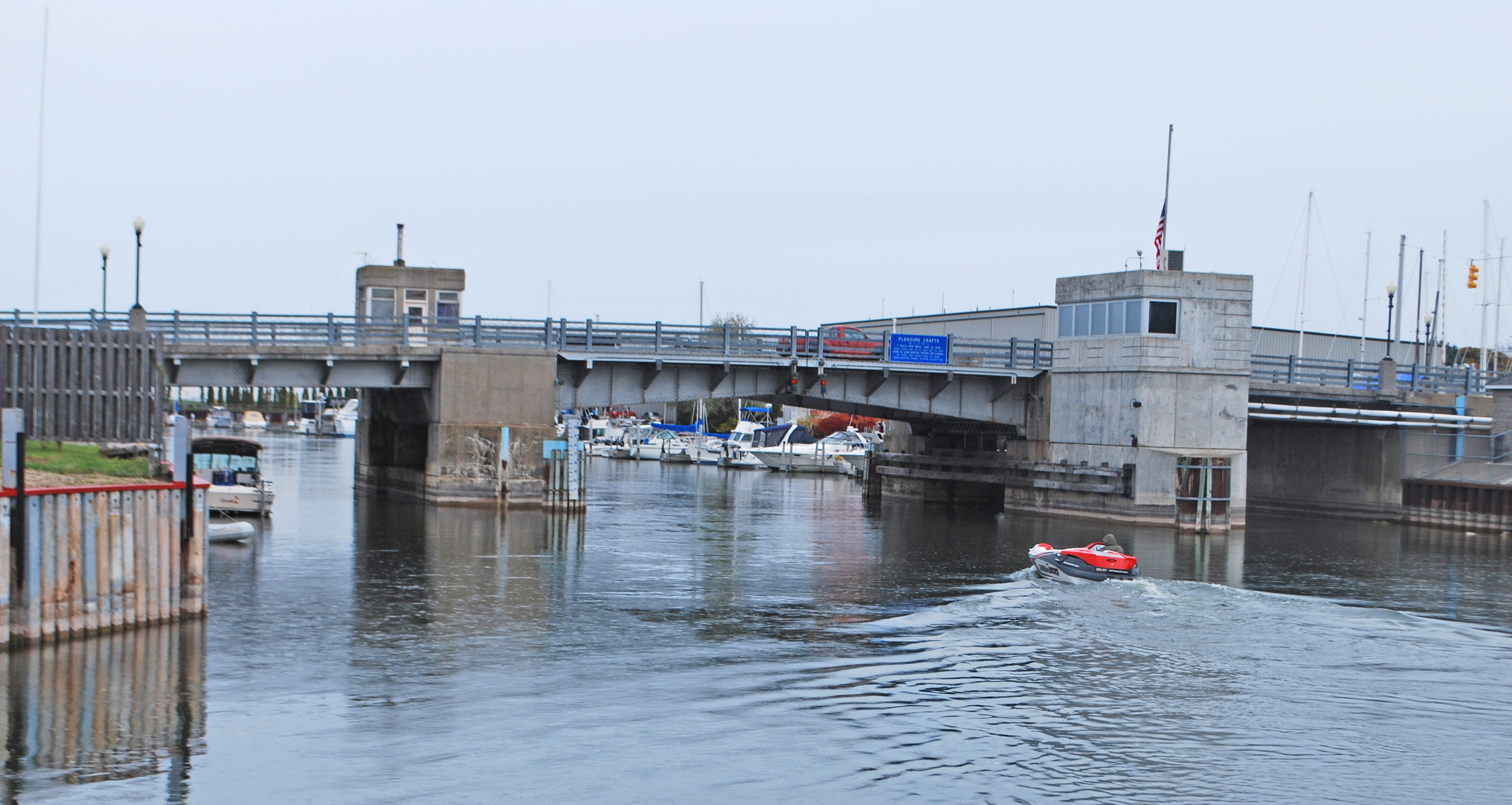
- Looking to the north at the bridge at dusk
- Coordinates: 45.6459°N 84.4728°W
- Carries: US 23
- Crosses: Cheboygan River
- Locale: Cheboygan, Michigan
- Owner: MDOT
- Maintained by: MDOT
- ID number: 1501

Characteristics
- Design: Double-leaf bascule
- Total length: 155 ft (47 m)
- Width: 51.8 ft (15.8 m)
- Longest span: 70 ft (21 m)
- No. of spans: 3

History
- Construction start: May 1940
- Construction cost: $206,000
- Opened: December 1940
- Inaugurated: December 7, 1904
- Cheboygan Bascule Bridge
- U.S. National Register of Historic Places
- NRHP reference No.: 99001509
- Added to NRHP: December 9, 1999

Location
- Interactive map of Cheboygan Bascule Bridge

The Cheboygan Bascule Bridge, (Note: The bridge is incorrectly listed as "Cheboyan Bascule Bridge" in the National Register Information System (NRIS) database, hence it is also incorrectly listed in various websites echoing the public domain NRIS data. Its correct name, using "Cheboygan" not "Cheboyan", is clear from the Michigan Department of Transportation webpage on the bridge.) also known as the State Street Bridge, is a double-leaf bascule bridge in Cheboygan, Michigan, carrying U.S. Highway 23 (State Street) across the Cheboygan River. Built in 1940, it was the last bascule bridge constructed in the state of Michigan prior to the end of World War II. It replaced an aging swing bridge built in 1877. The bridge is listed on the National Register of Historic Places.

== History ==
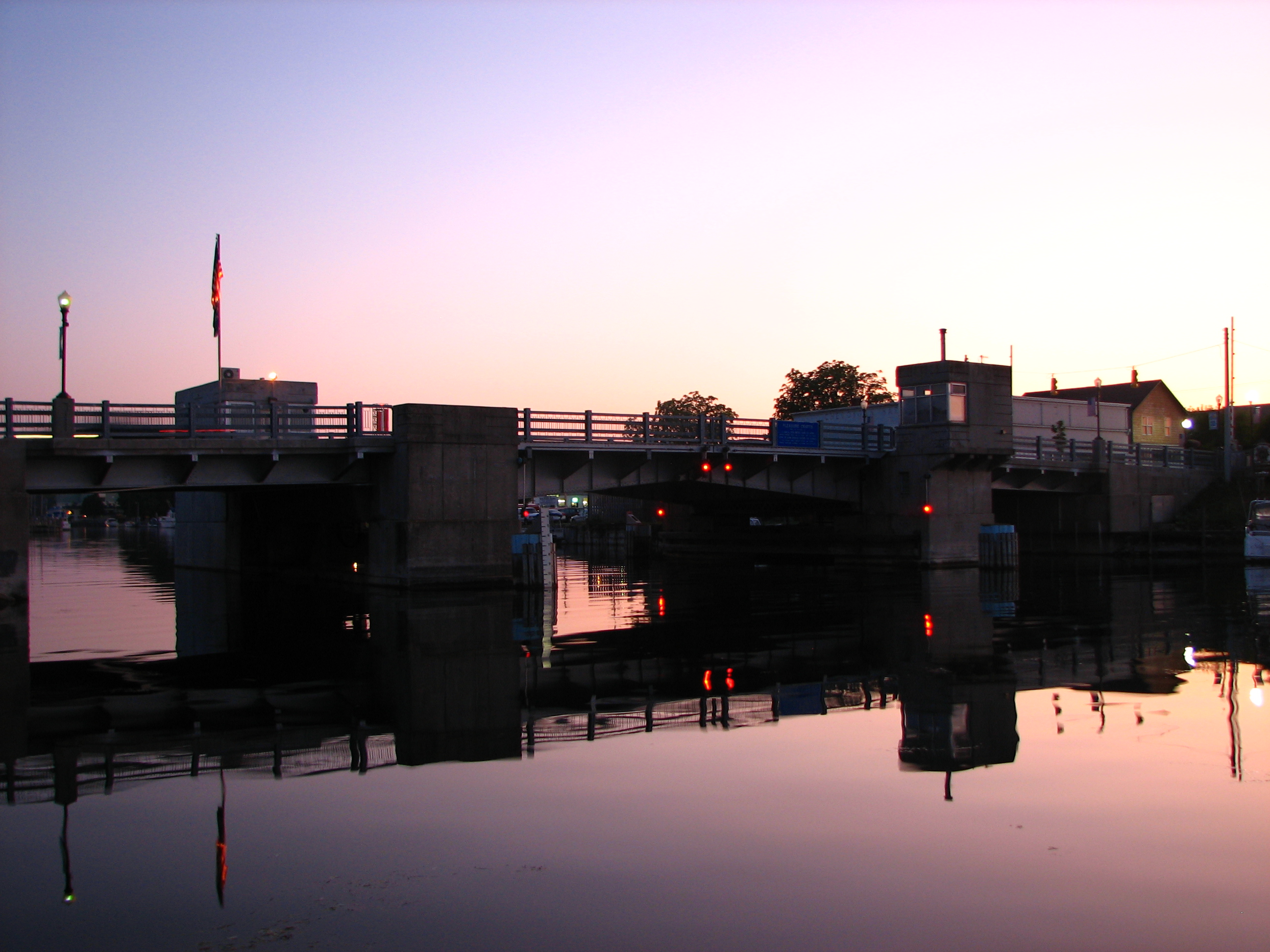
Bridge in the evening

Prior to the construction of the Cheboygan Bascule Bridge, a wrought-iron swing-span bridge crossed the Cheboygan River at this location. It was built in 1877 and by 1940, had become dangerous due to its age and heavy traffic load. Commissioner of the Michigan State Highway Department G. Donald Kennedy stated that it vibrated noisily and the unloaded end caused the "rusty old structure to bounce up and down on its seat." The Cheboygan Bascule Bridge is heavier and wider than this previous span.

The replacement bridge was designed by the state highway department in early 1940; consulting firm Hazelet and Erdal assisted with the bascule span. The contract was awarded to the W. J. Storen Company of Detroit as lowest bidder at $187,511.98. Steel and machinery were provided by the R. C. Mahon Company. Construction was scheduled to begin in May 1940 and finish in late autumn. The bridge was completed at a cost of $206,000 in December 1940, slightly behind schedule, due to the death of the contractor. The bridge was dedicated in a public ceremony on December 7, 1940. The dedication speech was given by G. Donald Kennedy, in which he described the bridge as "an achievement of state-wide significance." This was the final bascule bridge constructed in Michigan before the end of World War II. Other moveable spans planned for Charlevoix, Houghton, and St. Joseph were delayed until after war's end.

The bridge was listed on the National Register of Historic Places on December 9, 1999. It was eligible due to its preservation and as a mainstream example of bascule bridges in the state.

In 2003, the Michigan Department of Transportation (MDOT) planned rehabilitation work on the bridge to preserve its historical integrity and maintain safety. The project cost $2.1 million, funded by the Build Michigan II program and TEA-21. Major work commenced in January 2004 and finished in late June. The road surface and sidewalks were replaced and the leaves were balanced. The original railings were replaced with newly fabricated, historically accurate ones and were retrofitted with crash-worthy two-tube railings on the inside. Lighting was changed to match the designs used downtown on a community request. Construction was concentrated in the winter to minimize disruption to marine traffic. As of 2011, the bridge is rated as functionally obsolete, but not structurally deficient.

== Design ==
The bridge is a bascule bridge in a Scherzer rolling lift bridge configuration. The bridge's three spans are steel deck girders; the center span has girders of varying depth while the approach spans have uniform-depth girders. The center bascule span is 70 feet (21 m) long, flanked by two 42-foot-long (13 m) spans. The approach span road surface is a mixture of asphalt and concrete while the center span is a steel mesh. The 40-foot-wide (12 m) roadway is flanked by 5-foot-wide (1.5 m) sidewalks and standard moderne metal guard rails. On the downstream side of the north pier is the single-story bridge tender's house. When raised, a 60-foot-wide (18 m) navigable channel is available for marine vessels. The concrete abutments are founded on timber pilings and the two concrete piers rest on concrete footings supported by compact gravel 27 feet (8.2 m) below the river surface. The piers are protected by angled cutwaters and cylindrical fenders upriver. The bridge was notable for its safety features. It has six light standards (three to a side) along its length for illumination. Traffic gates and traffic lights warn traffic when the bridge will rise for vessels.

The Cheboygan bridge fits the mainstream of bascule bridge construction in Michigan in the 1930s and 1940s. Even though the bascule span has two leaves, a single leaf "probably would have sufficed" in its location.

== Draw schedule ==
From May 16 through September 15, the bridge opens on the quarter-hour and three-quarter hour between 6 a.m. and 6 p.m. and on signal between 6 p.m. and 6 a.m. The bridge also opens on signal from April 1 through May 15 and from September 16 through December 14. For the remainder of the year, from December 15 through March 31, no bridgetender is on duty, and the bridge does not open unless given twelve hours advance notice. For public and commercial vessels and vessels in distress, the bridge is opened as soon as possible.

The draw schedule was amended in June 2001. Prior to the amendment, twenty-four hours advance notice was necessary between December 15 and March 15. MDOT requested a change to twelve hours advance notice between December 15 and April 15 to reduce staffing requirements during the winter months when there is little to no marine traffic. The Commander of the Ninth Coast Guard District determined that the request would infringe on a ferry service that begins operation as early in spring as possible. In 1998, 1999, and 2000, no openings at all took place from December 15 through March 31 while some did through April 15. Thus, the request was modified to affect the period December 15 through March 31.

There has been some interest in adjusting the schedule to reduce automobile congestion. During 2002, the bridge could be raised four times an hour for up to ten minutes each time. Traffic can back up five blocks in either direction, and not wholly clear before the bridge opens again.

== See also ==
- List of bridges on the National Register of Historic Places in Michigan
- National Register of Historic Places listings in Cheboygan County, Michigan
