= Trout Fishing in America (duo) =

American musical duo

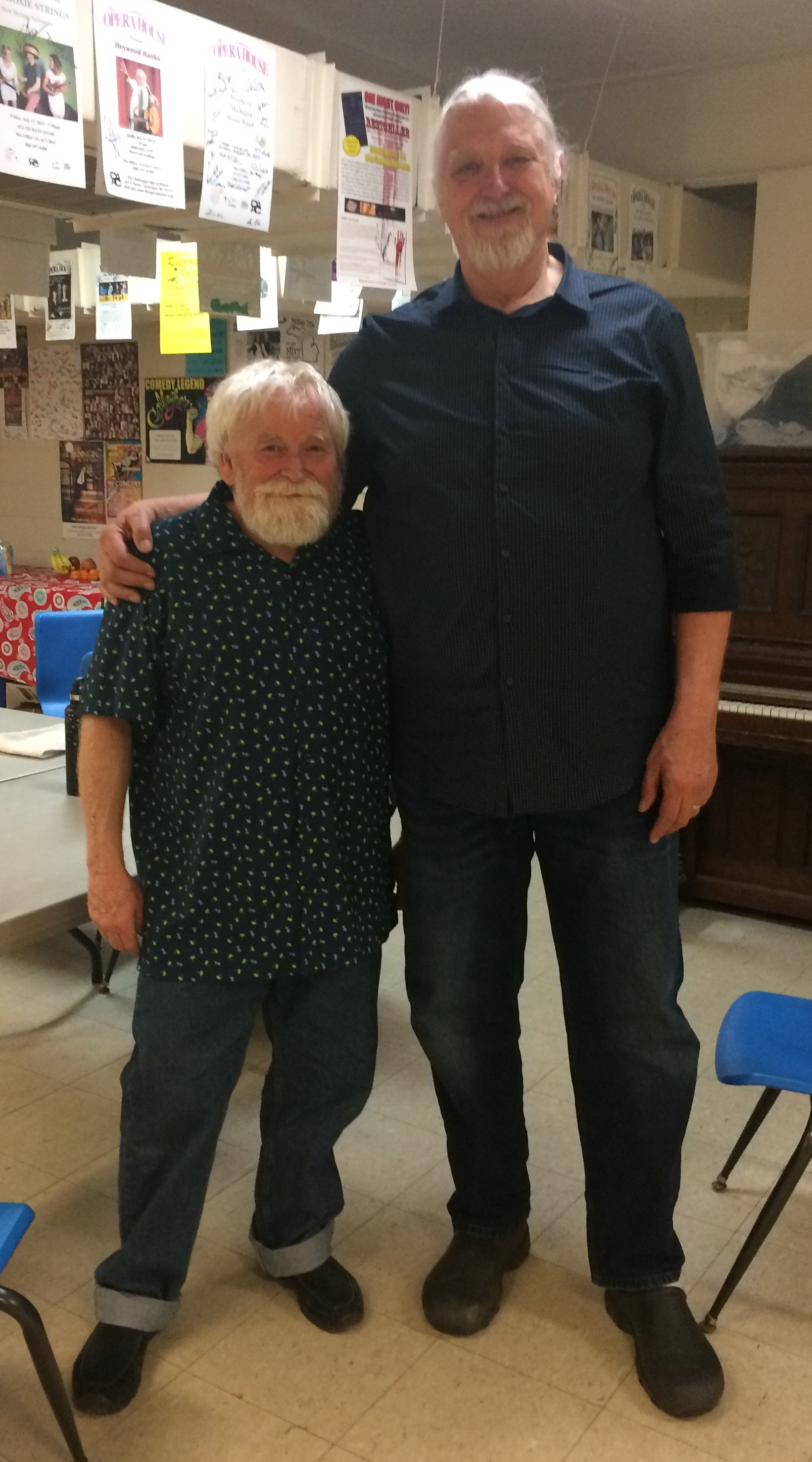
- Keith Grimwood (left) and Ezra Idlet (right) at the Opera House in Cheboygan, Michigan, April 2019

Background information
- Also known as: Pavlov's Band
- Origin: Houston, Texas, United States
- Genres: Folk rock; Children's
- Years active: 1976–present
- Label: Trout Records
- Spinoff of: St. Elmo's Fire
- Members: Keith Grimwood; Ezra Idlet
- Past members: Rom Rosenblum; Orville Strickland; Bill Berger
- Website: www.troutmusic.com

Trout Fishing in America is an American musical duo from Houston, Texas. The members are Keith Grimwood (vocals, bass guitar, upright bass, fiddle) and Ezra Idlet (vocals, electric and acoustic guitars, banjo, bouzouki, percussion). Both musicians were previously members of the folk rock band St. Elmo's Fire. They took their name from the novel Trout Fishing in America by Richard Brautigan. The duo has released 25 studio albums through their own label, Trout Records. Trout Fishing in America is known for varied musical styles, with albums alternating between folk rock and children's music, as well as their dynamic stage presence. In addition to their music, Trout Fishing in America holds songwriting workshops with children. Four of their albums have been nominated for Grammy Awards.

== History ==
Guitarist and vocalist Ezra Idlet was attending college in Waco, Texas, on a basketball scholarship when he decided to perform music instead. He worked at a dinner theater in Houston, Texas, and then joined the folk rock band Wheatfield, which evolved into St. Elmo's Fire. Bassist Keith Grimwood, a native of Alabama, originally performed in the Houston Symphony and chose to join St. Elmo's Fire in 1976 when the symphony went on strike. When several St. Elmo's Fire gigs in California were canceled, Grimwood and Idlet began performing together on the streets in order to earn money. They also performed for patrons of a local restaurant and entered a local talent competition.

When St. Elmo's Fire disbanded, Grimwood and Idlet officially began performing and recording as Trout Fishing in America. They took the name from the Richard Brautigan novel Trout Fishing in America. The two released their debut album You Bore Me to Death in 1979 through their own label, Trout Records. The album included a third member in pianist Rom Rosenblum. Drummer and vocalist Orville Strickland joined the lineup in 1981, thus making Trout Fishing in America a quartet. He appeared on their second album, Hot to Trout. By 1985, Bill Berger had replaced Orville Strickland on drums and vocals, and Rosenblum had left.

Trout Fishing in America renamed themselves Pavlov's Band in 1986. By 1988, Berger left as well, reverting the lineup to a duo of just Grimwood and Idlet. It was also around this point that the act's name reverted to Trout Fishing in America. They released two more albums, Yes, the Fish Music in 1987 and Stark Raving Trout in 1988. At this point the duo began performing shows for children and their parents, as opposed to their previous shows which were mostly held in bars. These children's shows included songs such as a cover of David Egan's "When I Was a Dinosaur". Twelve songs from their first four albums were reissued on a compilation called The Dusty Dozen in 2018.

The duo recorded an album of children's music titled Big Trouble in 1989 and released the 9-song project on cassette. In addition to a studio recording of "When I Was a Dinosaur", this included original compositions tailored to children, such as a nursery rhyme mashup called "The Window" and "Lullaby". "When I Was a Dinosaur" received regular rotation on the Dr. Demento radio show after its release. The recording of Big Trouble overlapped with their studio album Truth Is Stranger Than Fishin', a folk album released in 1990 on CD and cassette. It included a cover of Emily Kaitz's "The Day the Bass Players Took Over the World" and John Gorka's "Prom Night in Pig Town". Big Trouble was ultimately rereleased in 1991. The title track is about a child who makes excuses for destruction done to the family house in the parents' absence.

=== 1990s ===
After Big Trouble became popular among fans with young children, Trout Fishing in America began releasing more children's albums alongside their existing repertoire of folk music. Their 1992 album Over the Limit, one of their folk-oriented releases, was named by the National Association of Record Distributors (now American Association of Independent Music) as Independent Pop Album of the Year. The album included several session musicians and other personnel. This included drummer Mitch Marine and Carl Finch, who played keyboard and guitar in addition to serving as producer. Grimwood played both bass guitar and upright bass, while Idlet played both acoustic and electric guitars. The two wrote most of the album by themselves except for "Sing It One More Time Like That", also a cover of David Egan. Also by this point, the duo relocated to Arkansas. In 1993, Trout Fishing in America was approached by representatives of the television network Nickelodeon to create a television pilot called The Trout House, but it was not picked up for a series. This was followed in 1994 by a pair of albums targeting both demographics: Mine! for children and Who Are These People? for adults. Terri Langford of the Associated Press wrote of these two albums that "sometimes it's hard to tell which CD is for which target group" while speaking favorably of the duo's musical diversity.

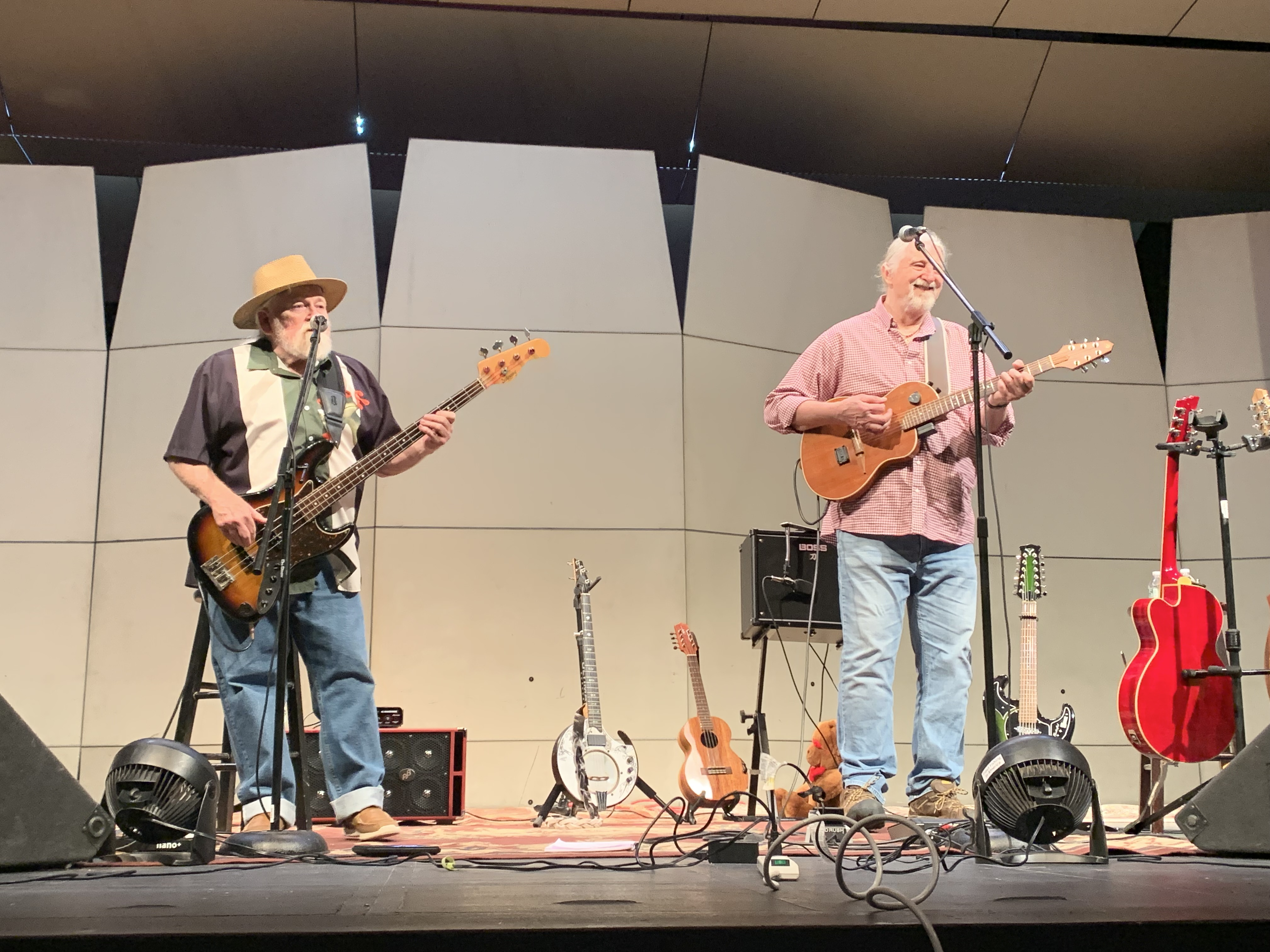
Trout Fishing in America at Olin Fine Arts Center in Washington & Jefferson College, Washington, Pennsylvania, 2026

They returned to folk rock for 1996's Reel Life, a mix of live and studio recordings. Once again, Grimwood and Idlet wrote most of the album themselves, excluding three cover songs. These were of Homer and Jethro's "Don't Let the Stars Get in Your Eyeballs" (a parody of "Don't Let the Stars Get in Your Eyes"), Gordon Lightfoot's "Ode to Big Blue", and Little Feat's "Dixie Chicken". Finch and Marine also played on some tracks on this album, while session musician Milo Deering contributed on steel guitar and mandolin. Writing for the Cedar Rapids, Iowa Gazette, Rebecca P. Lindwall praised the album's instrumentation, as well as the "homespun" lyrics of the ballad "Lightning". This was followed by 1997's My World, another children's album which the duo recorded in Nashville, Tennessee. After it was 1998's Family Music Party, their first live album. Paul Collins of AllMusic wrote of this album that it was "a fine addition to any parent's collection of children's music." In 1999 the duo released the album Closer to the Truth. While this was one of their folk albums, Idlet noted that "there's nothing on it that a kid couldn't hear". It peaked at number 26 on the Americana albums charts of Gavin Report. Tom Infield of The Philadelphia Inquirer thought the album displayed the duo's musical influences and variety. He also noted that the duo's music had become popular on WXPN, an independent radio station based at the University of Pennsylvania in Philadelphia, which had a show dedicated to children's music.

=== 2000s ===
The children's album inFINity followed in 2001. This accounted for the duo's first Grammy Award nomination, in the category of Best Musical Album for Children, at the 44th Grammy Awards in 2002. In addition, the American Library Association named it a Notable Children's Recording. Ronnie D. Lankford Jr. of Allmusic described the album as "fun music for kids and adults". 2003's It's a Puzzle was also a children's album. At the time of its release, Sony Hocklander of The Springfield News-Leader noted the popularity of children's albums such as Kenny Loggins' Return to Pooh Corner and Jerry Garcia and David Grisman's Not for Kids Only, and thought that Trout Fishing in America's music would appeal to fans of those albums. The title track featured a number of tongue twisters, while Grimwood's wife Beth co-wrote the track "Why I Pack My Lunch".

This was followed a year later by an album of Christmas music titled Merry Fishes to All. Reviewing this album for AllMusic, Lankford praised the duo for writing original content instead of covering traditional Christmas songs, while also finding influences of reggae and jazz music in the arrangements. At the time of its release, Trout Fishing in America were playing over 100 shows a year. In 2006 they released another live album titled My Best Day, which was also issued on DVD as a video album. By this point, Fred Bogert had taken over as their producer. He occasionally joined them as a backing musician, playing guitar, mandolin, and cornet. Bogert also contributed to the recordings of My Best Day. Both Merry Fishes to All and My Best Day were nominated for a Grammy Award for Best Musical Album for Children. In 2007, Trout Fishing in America released a five-song extended play titled Who Knows What We Might Do, which was available exclusively through their website or at concerts. In 2008, Trout Fishing in America released another album titled Big Round World. Musicians from the Louisiana-based dance group Bamboula 2000 contributed to this project. The duo promoted the album with a concert at Red River Revel, an annual music festival in Shreveport, Louisiana. It accounted for their fourth and final Grammy Award nomination, again in the category of Best Musical Album for Children. In addition, it topped National Public Radio's 2008 list "The Year in Music for Kids", an annual compilation of recommended children's albums by that organization.

=== 2010s and 2020s ===
After a number of children's albums, they returned to folk rock with 2010's Lookin' at Lucky. This was their first "adult" album since Closer to the Truth eleven years prior. Jonathan Takiff of the Philadelphia Daily News rated the album "B+", as he thought its songs would appeal to people who found humor in growing older. Although Trout Fishing in America recorded fewer albums throughout the 2010s, the duo continued to perform across the United States at venues such as museums and schools. They returned to the Red River Revel in 2013 to promote their next album of children's music, Rubber Baby Buggy Bumpers. By this point in their career, Grimwood noted that they had been performing long enough that they were beginning to play music for the grandchildren of some of their earliest fans. Idlet had begun to play banjo in concert as well as guitar, while Grimwood began to play fiddle as well as string bass and bass guitar. The album's title track included a number of tongue twisters, while Idlet stated that the track "My Sister Kissed Her Boyfriend" was intended to be "annoying" to children. In addition, the track "Don't Touch My Stuff" was inspired by the duo having had equipment stolen from their van while at a concert in Texas.

The duo returned to folk music with 2017's The Strangest Times. Prior to its release, they performed some of its songs live on the radio station KUAF in Fayetteville, Arkansas. Grimwood played fiddle on the track "Quiet Alleys", and Idlet played bouzouki on both the title track and "Where Did Everybody Go?" Grimwood said that he considered "The Strangest Times" one of his favorite songs the duo had ever recorded due to its "driving beat" and the "real things" in its lyrics. Trout Fishing in America continued to incorporate further instrumentation into their live shows, such as Idlet covering "Foggy Mountain Breakdown" on banjo. They also began to look for songs from their earlier albums which they thought had been forgotten by fans, such as "Big Boys in Bad Shape" from Closer to the Truth.

Trout Fishing in America took a brief hiatus from recording and touring in 2020 due to the COVID-19 pandemic. According to the members, the pandemic kept them separated from each other for 37 days, the longest hiatus of their career. Because they were unable to tour, they decided to resume writing songs together, in addition to performing songs on livestreams from their recording studio. Once they felt it was safe to start recording together again, they began preparing songs for their next album Safe House. Once again, Idlet played bouzouki on the album as well as guitar, banjo, and percussion, while Grimwood played bass, fiddle, and piano. Trout Fishing in America promoted the album with concerts in Texas once pandemic restrictions were lifted enough for them to resume touring. The duo also promoted the title track with a music video uploaded to YouTube, which features pictures of both members' families. Another album, One of These Days, followed in April 2026. The album includes 12 songs co-written by duo, as well as a cover of Emily Kaitz's "Jaywalking". Two months later, One of These Days was released on vinyl as well. In September 2026, the duo began their 50th anniversary tour, starting with a concert in Fayetteville, Arkansas, which also included a display of memorabilia.

== Other works ==
In addition to their albums and tours, Trout Fishing in America conducts songwriting workshops. During these, the duo encourages children to provide ideas for songs. The tracks "My Best Day" on inFINity, "Alien In My Nose" on It's a Puzzle, and several tracks on Big Round World were all inspired by comments made by children during such workshops.

Trout Fishing in America has also written two children's books with accompanying CDs: My Name Is Chicken Joe and Chicken Joe Forgets Something Important. Both books were published by Canadian publisher The Secret Mountain, and illustrated by Stéphane Jorisch.

== Musical style ==
Trout Fishing in America is known largely for their children's music, although many reviewers have noted the appeal of their music not only to parents, but also to adults who do not have children. While their early work was more conventional folk rock that often contained adult themes, the duo said that they chose to record more material suitable for children after both of them became fathers themselves. Specifically, "Big Trouble" was the first children's song they wrote. Grimwood also noted that due to this song's success with fans, schoolteachers would often attend their early concerts and encourage them to perform more children's music. By the release of inFINity, Grimwood had a teenaged son while Idlet had a son and daughter, both of whom were in college. Once the duo's music for children became popular, they initially dedicated some shows specifically to children's music and others to folk music. However, they ultimately decided to play "all ages" shows that mixed both styles. Despite this, the duo noted that they tended to avoid love songs or songs with longer solos if they saw that more children than adults were in attendance. Many of the duo's performances include audience participation. For example, on the song "My Hair Had a Party Last Night", Idlet encourages children in the audience to tousle each other's hair.

Tom Infield of The Philadelphia Inquirer thought that the duo were able to include a variety of influences in their music due to them mostly handling distribution and production by themselves instead of through a major record label. He noted influences of Lyle Lovett, Bruce Springsteen, the Band, and Gordon Lightfoot in songs from Closer to the Truth. Of their music, Andrew Griffin of The Town Talk thought that the duo's vocal harmonies and musical influences would help make their children's music appealing to adult fans as well; in particular, he thought the track "Wrong Right" from It's a Puzzle sounded like a 1960s pop song. A 1995 article in the St. Louis Post-Dispatch described the duo's music as "not pedantic, nor does it pander to children, but merely deals with topics that kids can relate to or those that will make them laugh." Grimwood told The Springfield News-Leader in 2003 that he intended to write songs that captured the imaginations of children and did not "talk down" to them.

Many sources have also highlighted the significant difference in height and personality between the duo's two members: Idlet is 6 ft 9 in (2.06 m) and Grimwood is 5 ft 5 in (1.65 m). Of this difference, Jason Ankeny of AllMusic wrote that they "delighted children with their rather arresting physical appearance". In relation to their height and stage presence, an uncredited article in the Kent County News also described Idlet as "playful and extroverted" and Grimwood as "serious and reserved".

== Discography ==
All releases under the Trout Records label.

- You Bore Me to Death!, 1979
- Hot to Trout, 1983
- Yes, the Fish Music, 1987
- Stark Raving Trout, 1988
- Truth Is Stranger Than Fishin', 1990
- Big Trouble, 1991
- Over the Limit, 1992
- Mine!, 1994
- Who Are These People?, 1994
- Reel Life, 1996
- My World, 1997
- Family Music Party, 1998
- Closer to the Truth, 1999
- InFINity, 2001
- It's a Puzzle, 2003
- Merry Fishes to All, 2004
- My Best Day, 2006
- Who Knows What We Might Do (EP), 2007
- Big Round World, 2008
- Lookin' at Lucky, 2010
- Rubber Baby Buggy Bumpers, 2013
- The Strangest Times, 2017
- The Dusty Dozen, 2018
- Safe House, 2022
- One of These Days, 2026
