= Chuckyy =

American rapper (born 2006)

- Born: Charles Edward Davis; January 20, 2006 (age 20); Chicago, Illinois, U.S.
- Genres: Drill
- Occupations: Rapper; record producer
- Years active: 2023–present
- Labels: Only the Family, Santa Anna

Charles Edward Davis (born January 20, 2006), known professionally as Chuckyy, is an American rapper and record producer from the Altgeld Gardens neighborhood on the Far South Side of Chicago, Illinois. He is signed to Lil Durk’s record label, Only the Family, in partnership with Santa Anna Records. He is best known for his 2025 single "My World", which peaked at number 79 on the Billboard Hot 100.

== Career ==
=== Early Recognition & Signing (2024) ===
Chuckyy first started making music recently, in 2023. In April 2024, he was signed by Chicago rapper Lil Durk to his record label, Only the Family, marking a major milestone early in his career. He first attracted attention in August 2024 when Pitchfork named his single "Hear My Chains" a standout new rap release, highlighting its ominous production and intense delivery. The following month, he released "Bumblebee", which Pitchfork selected as a Best New Track, characterizing it as panicked, high-energy, and reflective of a horror-tinged drill style.

=== Breakthrough Single: "My World" (April 2025) ===
On April 24, 2025, Chuckyy released "My World", which quickly went viral on TikTok and across streaming platforms. Produced by Bugg and sampling Ekkstacy’s "I Walk This Earth All By Myself," the track generated hundreds of thousands of plays within weeks. "My World" became Chuckyy's first entry on the Billboard Hot 100, debuting and peaking at number 79 for the week of May 10, 2025.

=== Signing and Mixtape Release (May 2025) ===
By mid-2025, Chuckyy had become the protégé of Chicago artists Lil Durk and Lucki. His affiliation with Only the Family was highlighted in interviews, marking a significant step in his rise. His debut full-length project, I Live, I Die, I Live Again, was released through Santa Anna Records in May 2025, earning praise for its atmospheric horror-core influences and minimalist, suspenseful production.

=== Reception and Collaborations (June 2025) ===
Pitchfork noted that I Live, I Die, I Live Again showcased a distinct, cinematic evolution in Chuckyy's sound, forgoing traditional song structures in favor of eerie minimalism and thematic tension. The mixtape also featured "Hotseat," a collaboration with Lucki, which was highlighted in Passion of the Weiss’s Rap-Up column in June 2025. Coverage from XXL and BrooklynVegan included the mixtape among May 2025's most notable rap releases.

=== Deluxe Edition: "I Live, I Die, I Live Again (Resurrected)" (August 2025) ===
In August 2025, Chuckyy released the deluxe edition of his mixtape, titled I Live, I Die, I Live Again (Resurrected). This version added seven new tracks, blending horrorcore and drill elements, and featured collaborations with Rob49 and Veeze. The album expanded on and continued the exploration of the album's dark, atmospheric themes.
