= Faunce–McMichael Farm =

- U.S. National Register of Historic Places
- U.S. Historic district
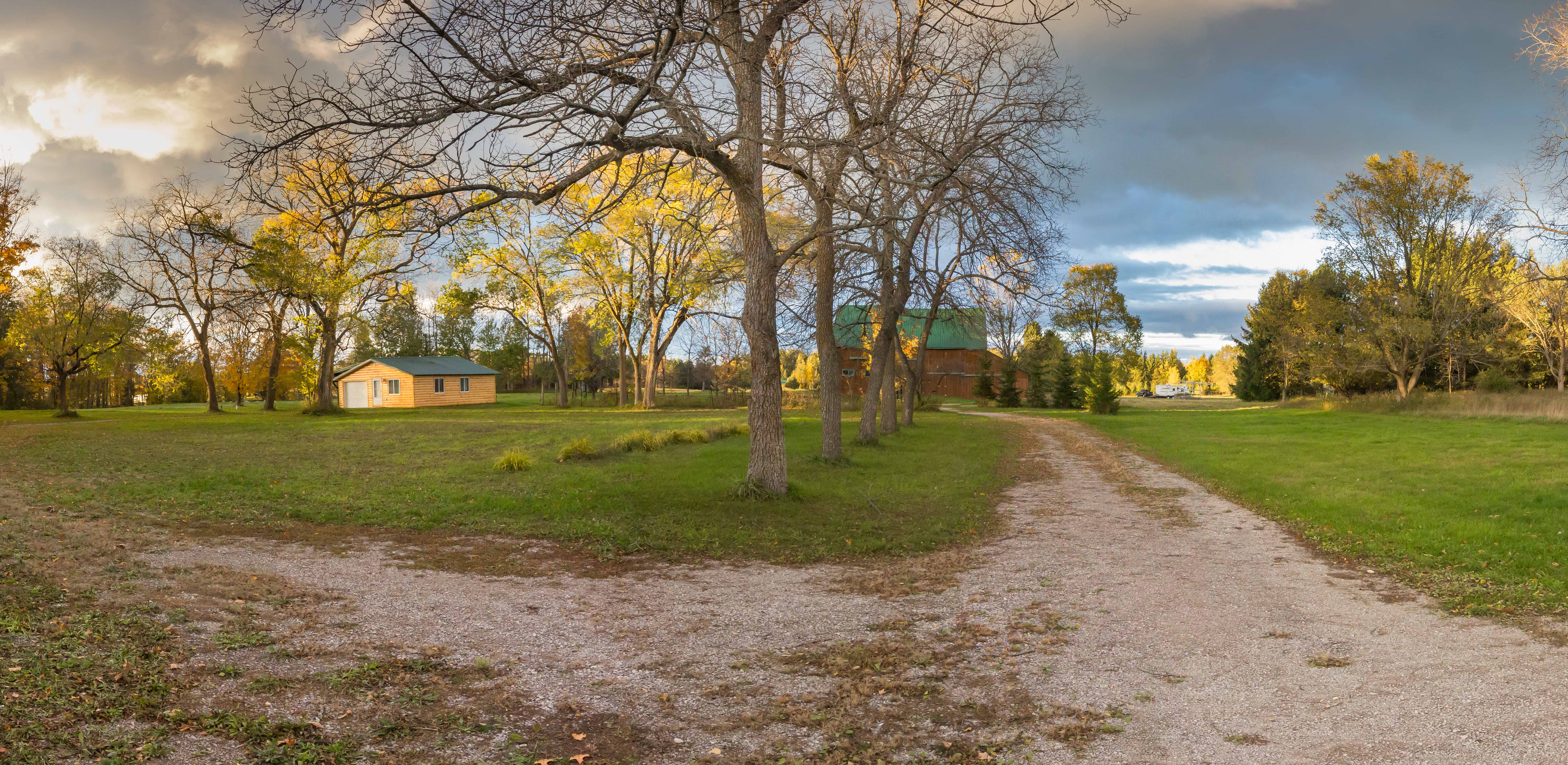

- Location within Michigan Location within the United States
- Interactive map
- Location: 11126 M68, Burt Lake, Michigan
- Coordinates: 45°26′34″N 84°42′48″W
- Area: 17 acres (6.9 ha)
- Architectural style: Two story, side gable
- NRHP reference No.: 90000801
- Added to NRHP: May 31, 1990

The Faunce–McMichael Farm, also known as the James Cosset McMichael Farm or the William H. and Shirley A. Billings Farm, is a farm located at 11126 M68 in Burt Lake, Michigan. It is one of the oldest barns in the township, and was listed on the National Register of Historic Places in 1990.

== History ==
In 1875, pioneer Ezra Faunce homesteaded this property, and built what was likely a log cabin to live in. Faunce was one of the first European settlers in the area, and served in multiple offices in the township and school district, including as the first township supervisor in 1877. In 1881, he constructed the barn located on this property, with help from others in the community, including the newly arrived James McMichael.

In 1895, James McMichael purchased the farm from the Faunce family. He and his wife Mary farmed the property, but in 1896 James fell ill and never really recovered. In 1900, they built a new farmhouse to replace the earlier house constructed by Faunce. The next year, they moved to Texas, hoping to improve James's health, but returned in 1903. James McMichael died in 1909. Mary McMichael began working for a local telephone company, and in 1917 returned to teaching school. She remarried in 1922. The house and farm passed to her daughter Dora Ione and her husband, and later to their daughter.

== Description ==
The Faunce–McMichael Farm is a complex of buildings located on about seventeen acres. The buildings include the 1881 barn, the 1900 farmhouse, a chicken house, and a former pumphouse / shop building. The house is a two-story wooden frame structure with a two-story, side-gable front section and a 1 1/2-story rear ell. The barn is a New England barn, commonly used on smaller farms throughout Michigan in the nineteenth century. The barn is virtually unaltered from its original appearance.

The farmhouse has been demolished.
