= My World (Chuckyy song) =

2025 single by Chuckyy

Single by Chuckyy

from the album I Live, I Die, I Live Again
- Released: April 24, 2025
- Genre: Hip-hop
- Length: 2:37
- Label: Santa Anna
- Songwriters: Charles Davis; David Meiners; Kyree Zienty; Samuel Guye
- Producer: Bugg

Chuckyy singles chronology
"We Got Buttons" (2025)	"My World" (2025)	"Hotseat" (2025)

Music video
- "My World" on YouTube

"My World" is a song by American rapper Chuckyy, released on April 24, 2025 as the third single from his third studio album I Live, I Die, I Live Again. Produced by Bugg, it contains a sample of "I Walk This Earth All By Myself" by Ekkstacy. The song gained traction on the video-sharing platform TikTok and became Chuckyy's first song to chart, debuting and peaking at number 79 on the Billboard Hot 100.

== Background and promotion ==
On April 2, 2025, a TikTok account promoting Chuckyy's unreleased music shared a snippet of the song. It quickly went viral and earned over 728,000 views and nearly 75,000 likes by the end of the month. The song's original sound and official audio soundtracked nearly 50,000 and over 10,000 clips respectively. The lyrics "Super slime, I can't trust nothin', that's why I'm rockin' this Chrome" gained special attention and have been frequently used in such videos to concern the urge to shy away from vulnerability. "My World" was officially released on April 24. According to Luminate, it gained over 745,000 U.S. on-demand audio streams on April 25.

In an interview with Genius, Chuckyy explained how the song was created.

What inspired "My World" was by an artist named Ekkstacy, I heard it, and I added it to my playlist. I was messing around with it for a minute, and then I got a home studio, so like anytime I wanna do something, I just get up and do it, mess with it, type shit. We sampled the beat, and that's pretty much how I got done.

== Critical reception ==
On their year-end chart for the top 50 best songs of 2025, Complex ranked "My World" at #26, with Will Schube of the company writing that on “My World,” Chuckyy blends his signature horror-themed aesthetic with a more emo-leaning sound, highlighting the track’s sample of EKKSTACY’s “i walk this earth all by myself” and praising his deadpan delivery and bleak lyricism, particularly the line “Just because we went to school and I got rich don't mean we teams.”

== Charts ==
Chart performance for "My World"
Chart (2025)	Peak position
US Billboard Hot 100	79
