= Old Cheboygan County Courthouse =

United States historic place

- Cheboygan County Courthouse
- U.S. National Register of Historic Places
- Michigan State Historic Site
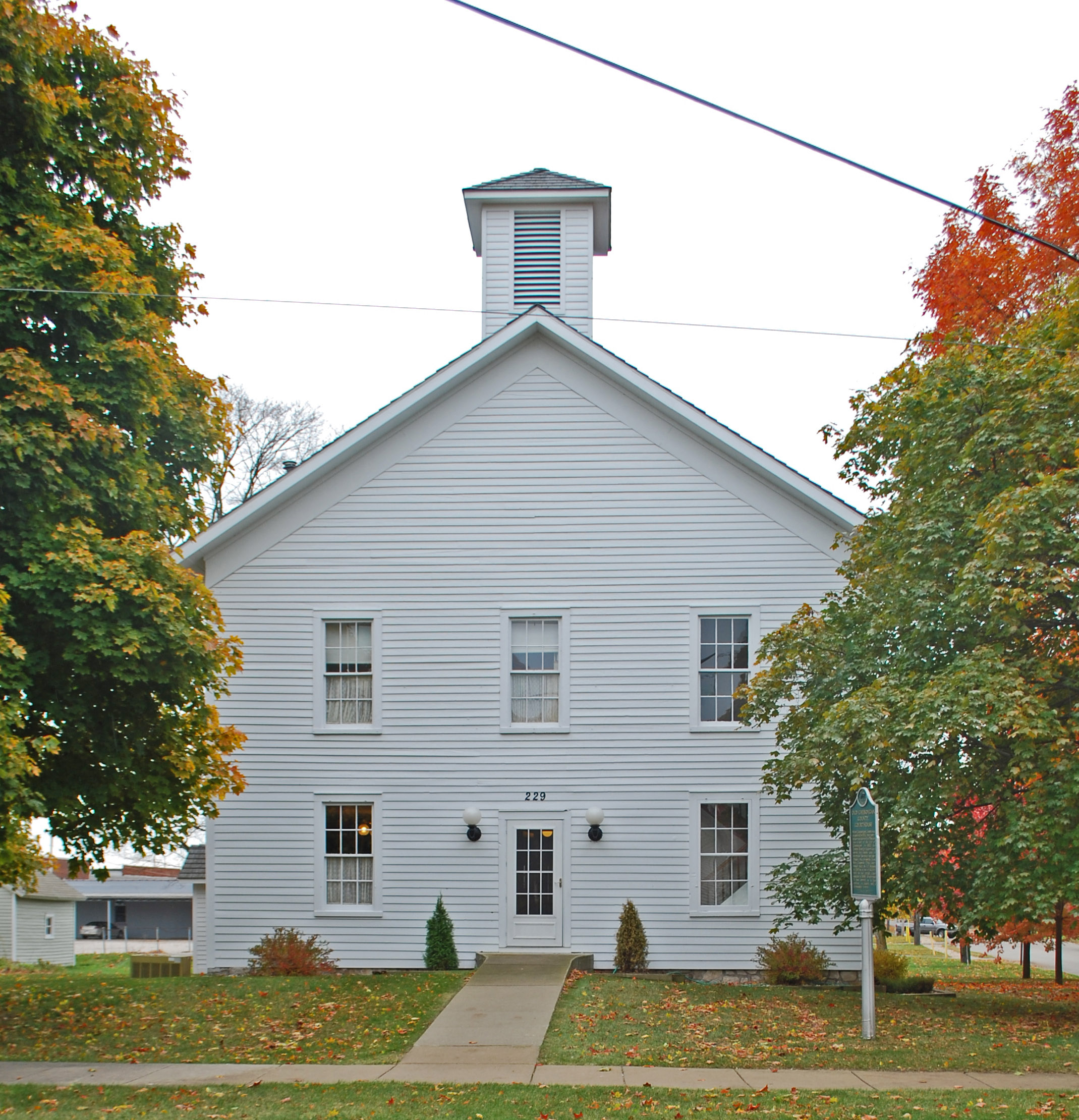

- Location within Michigan Location within the United States
- Interactive map showing the location of Old Cheboygan County Courthouse
- Location: 229 Court St., Cheboygan, Michigan
- Coordinates: 45°38′22″N 84°28′56″W
- Area: less than one acre
- Built: 1869
- Built by: James F. Watson
- NRHP reference No.: 86001010

Significant dates
- Added to NRHP: May 8, 1986
- Designated MSHS: September 15, 1975

The Old Cheboygan County Courthouse is a government building located at 229 Court Street in Cheboygan, Michigan. It was designated a Michigan State Historic Site in 1975 and listed on the National Register of Historic Places in 1986.

== History ==
Cheboygan County was organized in 1853, and the county seat was located in Duncan. In 1860, the county board of supervisors moved the county seat to this location. The building was constructed in 1869 by James F. Watson for $3000. The building served as a courthouse until 1899, when the county built a new courthouse.

After the court moved, the old courthouse was used for multiple purposes through the years, including a fire station, a church, a community center, a boxing gym, a veteran's center, and simply for storage. In 1983, the building was extensively renovated and turned into law offices. It currently serves as the Cheboygan office of the law firm Bodman PLC.

== Description ==
The Old Cheboygan County Courthouse is a two-story wooden structure measuring 28 by 65 feet (8.5 by 19.8 m). When built, it contained a courtroom on the second floor and county offices on the first.
