= Newton–Allaire House =

Historic house in Michigan, United States

- U.S. National Register of Historic Places
- Michigan State Historic Site
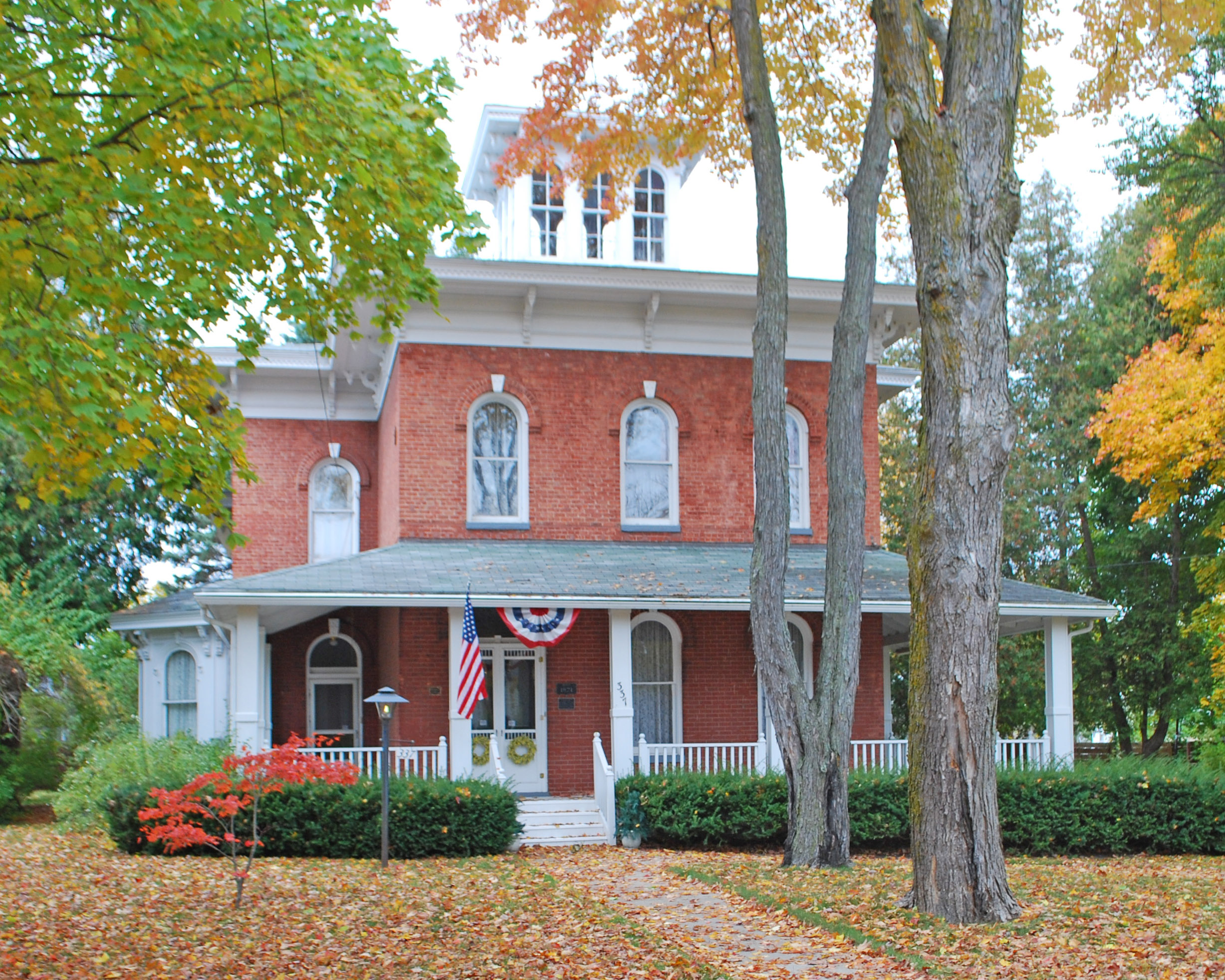

- Location within Michigan Location within the United States
- Interactive map
- Location: 337 Dresser Street, Cheboygan, Michigan
- Coordinates: 45°38′47″N 84°28′44″W
- Area: 1 acre (0.40 ha)
- Built: 1871
- Architectural style: Italianate
- NRHP reference No.: 83000840

Significant dates
- Added to NRHP: February 10, 1983
- Designated MSHS: October 23, 1979

The Newton–Allaire House is a private house located at 337 Dresser Street in Cheboygan, Michigan. It was designated a Michigan State Historic Site in 1979 and listed on the National Register of Historic Places in 1983.

== History ==
Archibald and Carl Newton (descendants of Sir Isaac Newton) purchased the island of Saint Helena, near the Straits of Mackinac, in 1853. The brothers (married to sisters of Chippewa descent) developed the island into a fuel and supply stop for passenger and cargo ships traveling through the straits. The venture proved successful, and they used the profits to establish commercial interests in Cheboygan. In 1870, Archibald Newton was elected village president.

In 1871, Archibald Newton (a widower) constructed this house as a wedding present for his second wife, Cornelia Allaire. Archibald Newton died in 1892, and Cornelia in 1916. Cornelia willed the house to her brother, Joseph Allaire Jr., who moved in that year. The house remained in the Allaire family for 127 years. In 2013, the home reverted into the Newton side of the family when the home was purchased by the great-great-grandson of A.P. Newton.

== Description ==
The house is a two-story red brick Italianate structure with a hip roof. The symmetrical facade is three bays wide, and includes rounded arch windows with brick lintels and keystones above. Carved bracketry supports the wide eaves. At the peak of the roof sits a cupola (or belvedere) with its own rounded arch windows and hip roof supported at the eavesline with bracketry. A wide porch wraps around the first floor of the house. A projecting side-wall houses a bay window and entryway. A modern gable-roof garage is connected to the rear of the house. Multiple ghost sightings have been reported at the home by the Allaire family and residents of Cheboygan. Several incidents involve flickering lights, rooms that become ice cold, and objects that mysteriously move on their own.
