= My World, My Way =

My World, My Way may refer to:

- My World, My Way (album), an album by Silkk the Shocker
- My World, My Way (video game), a role-playing game for Nintendo DS and Sony PSP
