= Opera House (Cheboygan) =

Historic municipal performance venue in Cheboygan, Michigan

Cheboygan Opera House
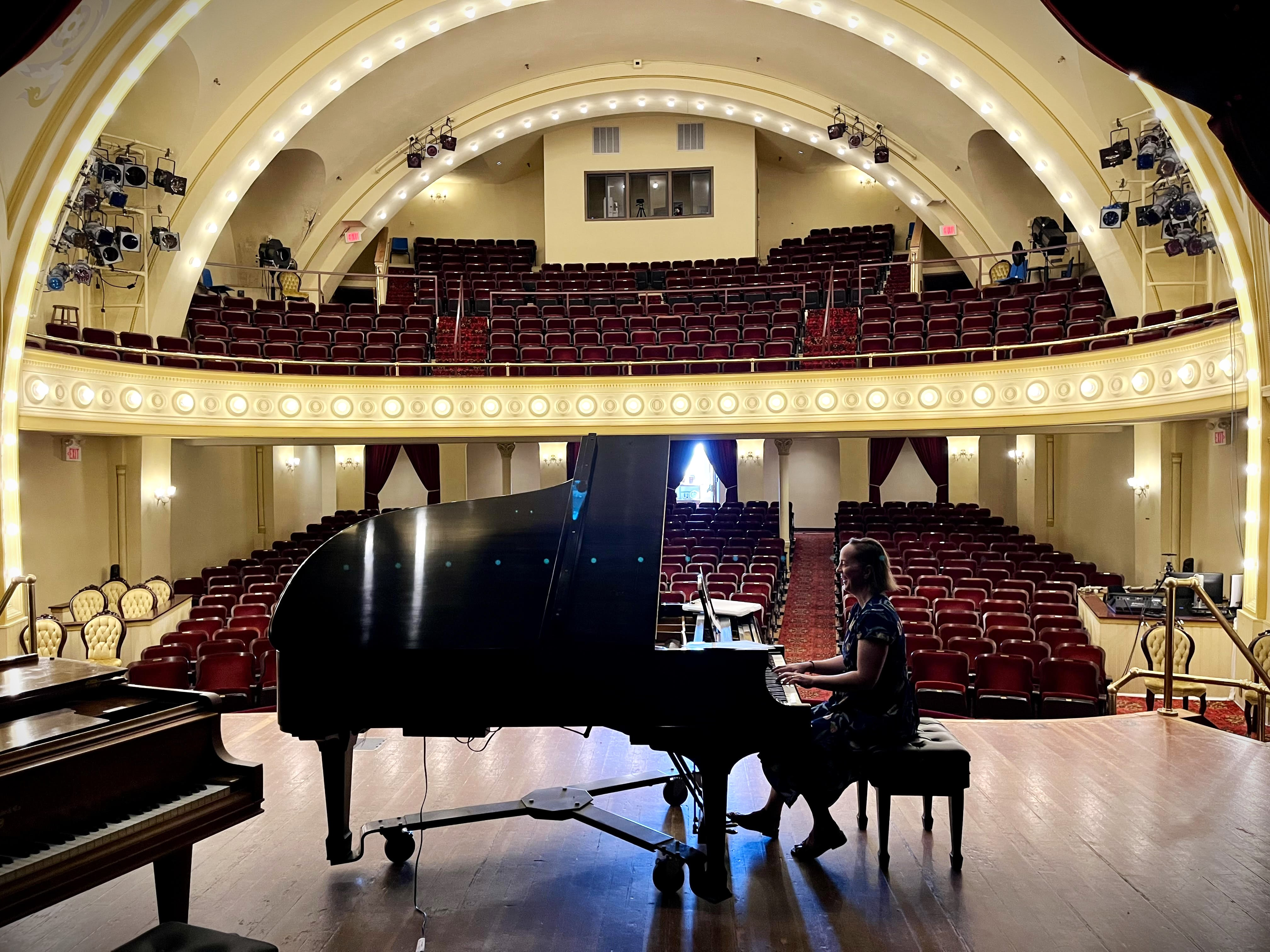
- Interactive map of Cheboygan Opera House
- Address: 403 N. Huron Street
- Location: Cheboygan, Michigan, U.S.
- Coordinates: 45.64769°N 84.47553°W
- Owner: City of Cheboygan
- Operator: Cheboygan Area Arts Council
- Seating type: Orchestra and balcony
- Capacity: 582
- Type: Performing arts theater

Construction
- Opened: 1877 (original); 1888 (rebuild); 1904 (rebuild)
- Reopened: 1984 (after restoration)

Website
- theoperahouse.org

The Cheboygan Opera House is a historic municipal performing arts venue in downtown Cheboygan, Michigan. It is part of a multi-use civic complex that houses Cheboygan City Hall, the city's police department, and fire station, with the theater located on the upper level of the building at 403 N. Huron Street. The venue is owned by the City of Cheboygan and operated by the non-profit Cheboygan Area Arts Council. (Note: Sometimes locally referred to simply as "The Opera House.") The auditorium seats 582 and is noted for its Victorian-era design and acoustics.

The building is recognized locally as a historic resource and is listed as a Michigan State Historic Site.

== History ==
Cheboygan's first city hall and opera house was erected in 1877 as a wood-frame, two-story building that combined municipal functions with a public performance hall. The original structure burned in December 1886 and was replaced by a three-story brick and sandstone building that opened on July 30, 1888. A second major fire in October 1903 destroyed the roof and upper story; the opera house was extensively rebuilt and the upper level reconstructed in 1904, retaining the acoustical qualities of the 1888 theater.

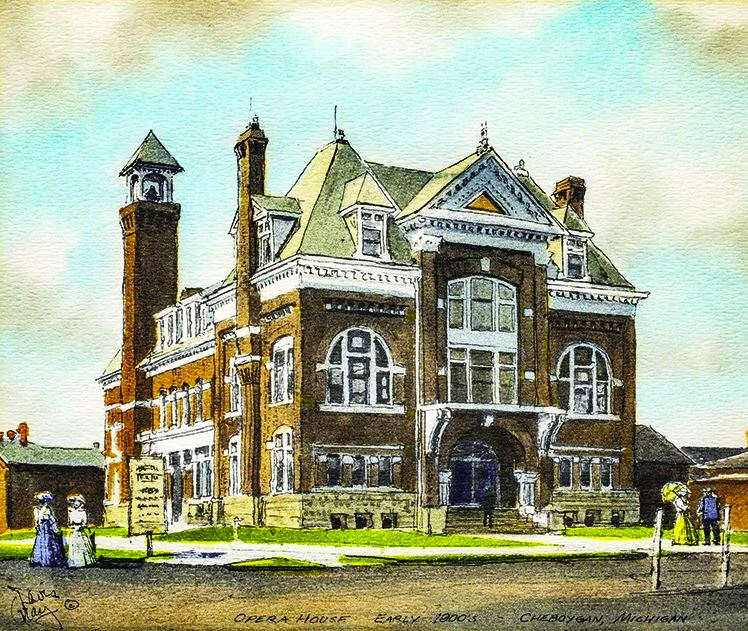
Cheboygan Opera House (exterior, 1903)

The venue hosted national touring acts through the early and mid-20th century, and like many opera houses, saw usage decline with the rise of cinema. By the mid-1960s, the theater portion was condemned, and the building sat largely vacant while funding for restoration was pursued. In 1974, voters approved a 15-year millage toward restoration; additional state and federal support, along with private donations, funded the project. The restored opera house reopened to the public on April 4, 1984.

== Architecture ==
The current building is a red-brick Romanesque-style civic block with arched openings and a Victorian theater interior. The complex continues its original mixed-use program: city offices and public safety on the lower levels and the auditorium above.

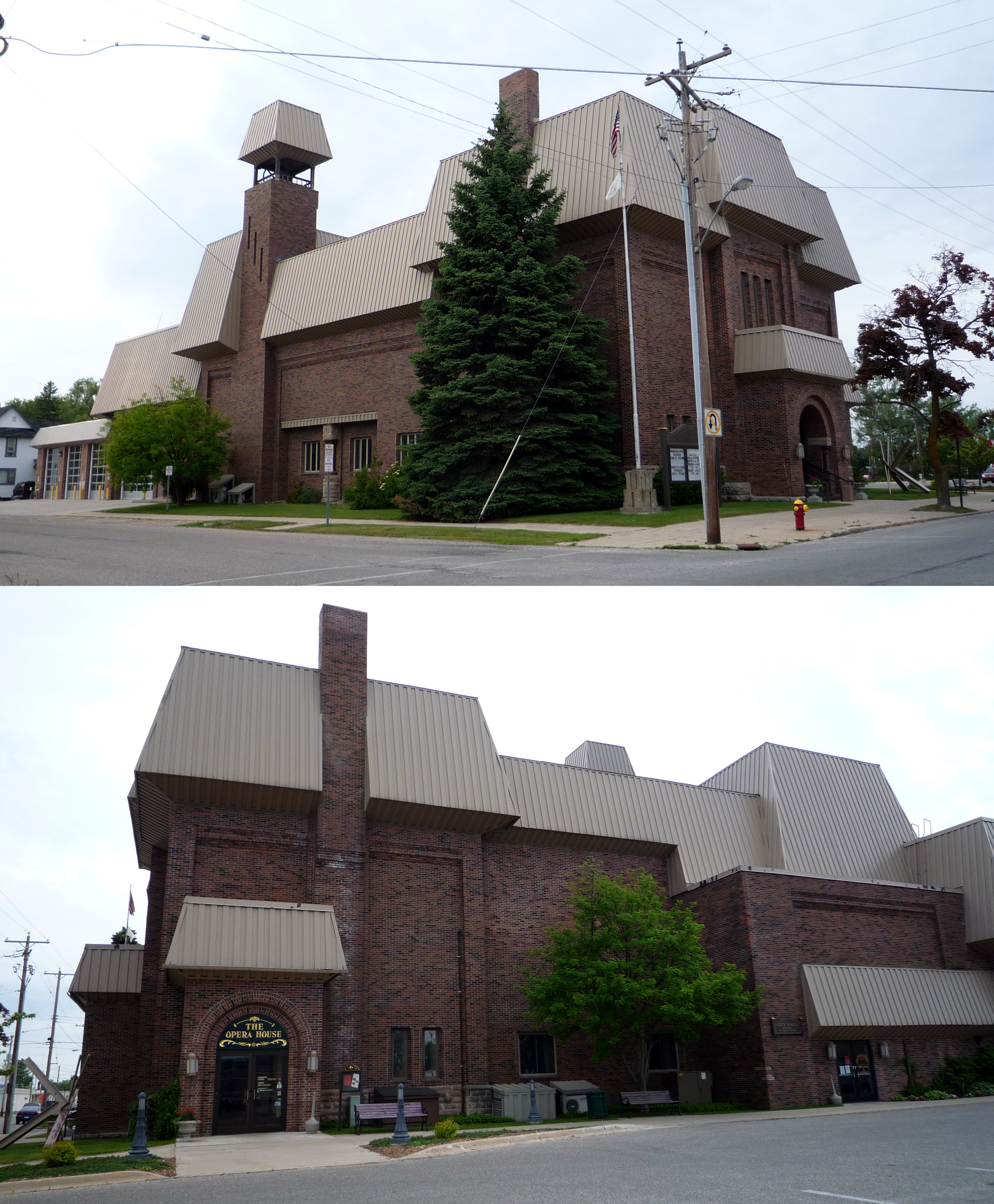
Opposite views of the current multi-use complex

== Operations and programming ==
The Cheboygan Area Arts Council (CAAC) manages year-round presenting, education, and community programs at the venue, including a dance school, student matinees, lessons, and scholarships for area youth. The theater is also available for rentals and features a Steinway Model B piano, film projection, and livestream/recording capabilities. Total capacity is 582, with designated wheelchair spaces on the main floor.

== Accessibility and recent upgrades ==
In 2023, the CAAC received a US$250,000 Consumers Energy Foundation grant to improve accessibility—including stage and backstage access, upgraded accessible seating, and related patron improvements.

== Notable performers ==
Promotional materials and tourism sources note appearances by early film and stage celebrities, including Mary Pickford, Marie Dressler, William S. Hart, and Annie Oakley, among others.

== See also ==
- List of Michigan State Historic Sites in Cheboygan County
