= Mi Mundo =

Mi Mundo may refer to:

- Mi Mundo (Marta Sánchez album), 1995
- Mi Mundo (Luis Enrique album), 1989
- Mi Mundo (Brenda Navarrete album), 2018
