= Fort Michilimackinac State Park =

State park in Michigan, United States

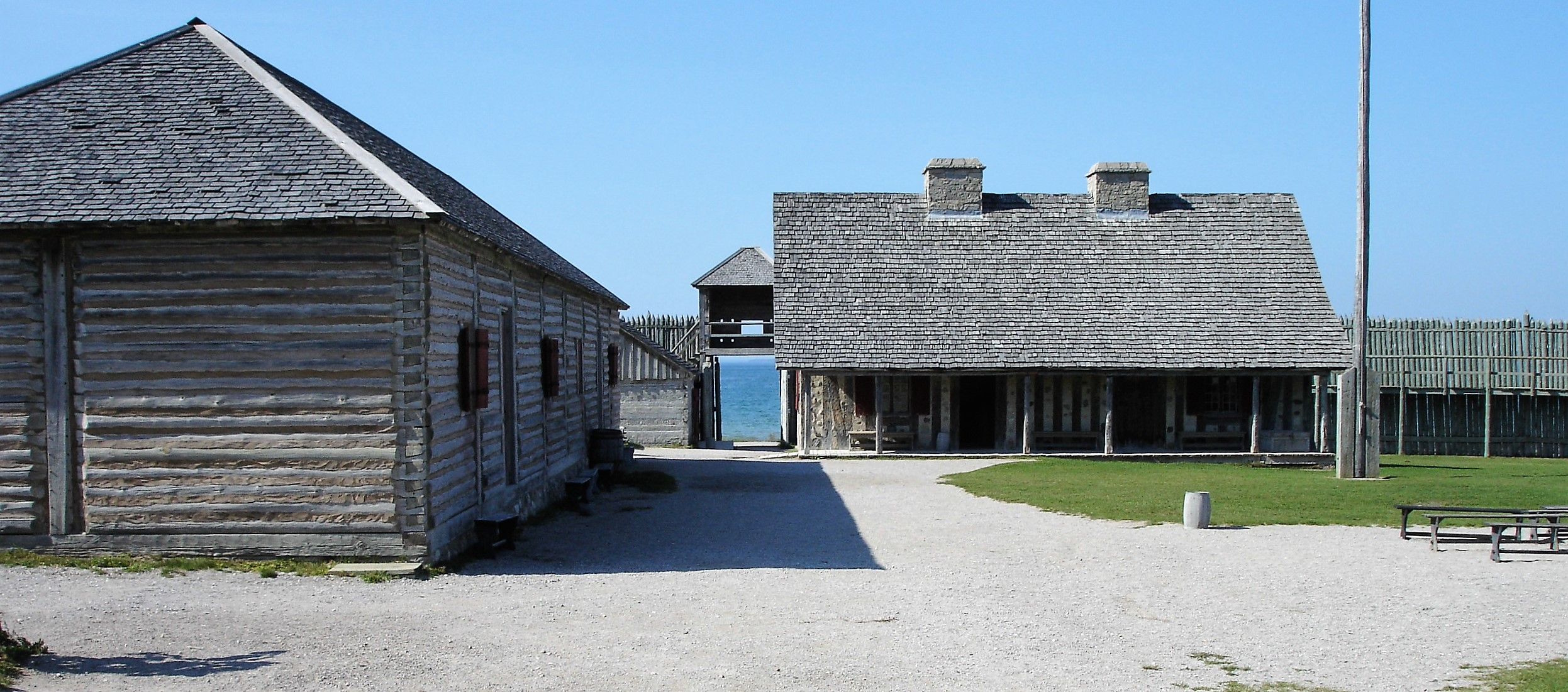
- View from inside Fort Michilimackinac

- Location within Michigan Location within the United States
- Location: Wawatam Township; Emmet County, Michigan
- Nearest city: Mackinaw City, Michigan
- Coordinates: 45°47′13″N 84°44′08″W
- Governing body: Michigan Department of Natural Resources
- Website: www.mackinacparks.com/fort-mackinac/

Fort Michilimackinac State Park is a state park in the U.S. state of Michigan. It is located in Mackinaw City along the Straits of Mackinac. The park contains Fort Michilimackinac, which itself is dedicated a National Historic Landmark and Old Mackinac Point Lighthouse as well as the Old Mackinac Point Lighthouse Signal Tower which contains a foghorn.

== Colonial Michilimackinac ==
Colonial Michilimackinac is a reconstructed 1715 French fur trading village and military outpost that was later occupied by British military and traders.

Today, it features re-enactments from British 1770s occupation and the American Revolutionary era. A National Historic Landmark, Colonial Michilimackinac is accredited by American Association of Museums.

== Fort Michilimackinac ==
Fort Michilimackinac was an 18th-century French, and later British, fort and trading post in the Great Lakes of North America. Built around 1715, it was located along the southern shore of the strategic Straits of Mackinac connecting Lake Huron and Lake Michigan, at the northern tip of the lower peninsula of the present-day state of Michigan in the United States. The site of the fort in present-day Mackinaw City, Michigan is a National Historic Landmark and is now preserved as an open-air historical museum.

== History ==
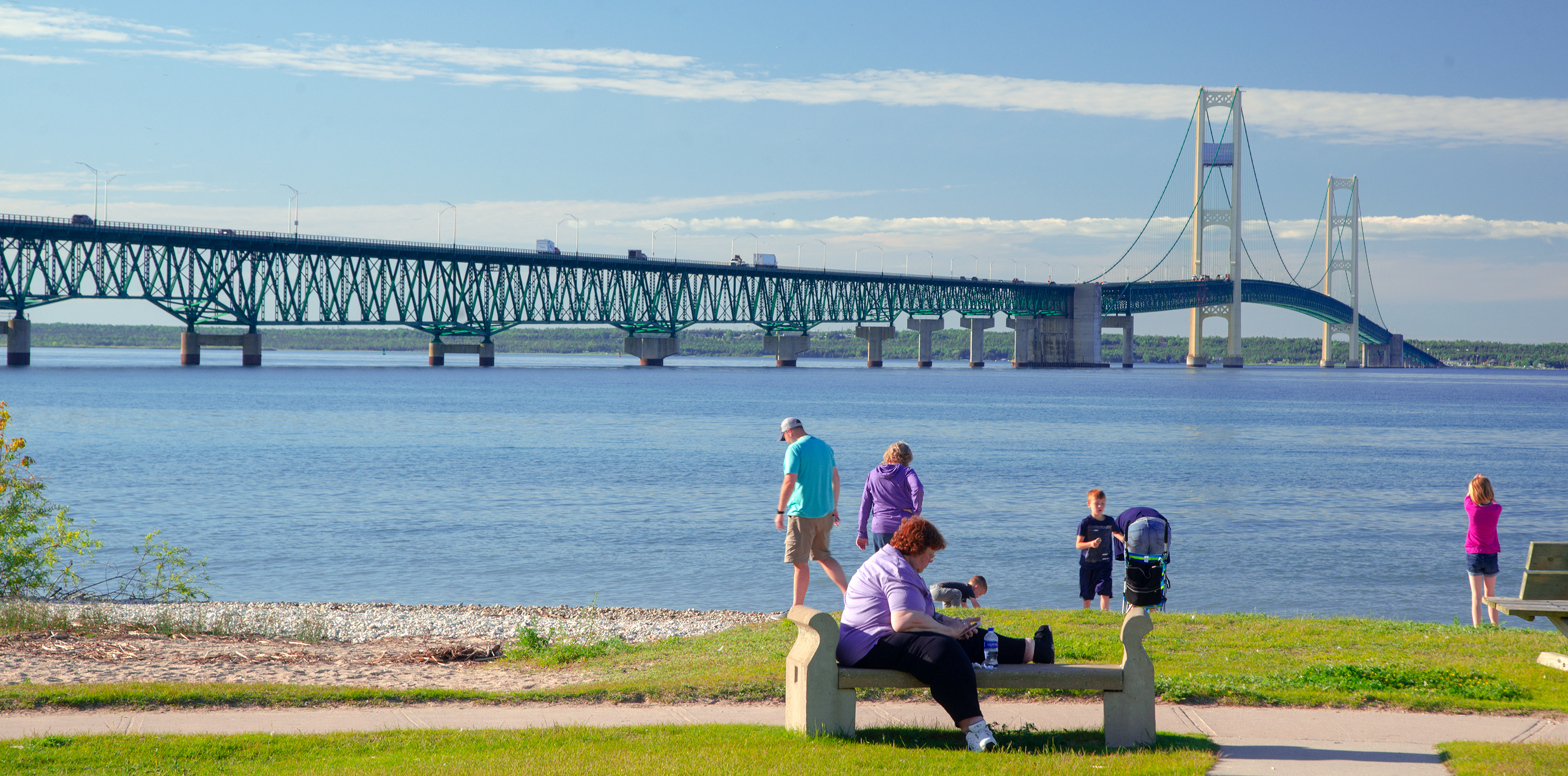
Mackinac Bridge from the state park

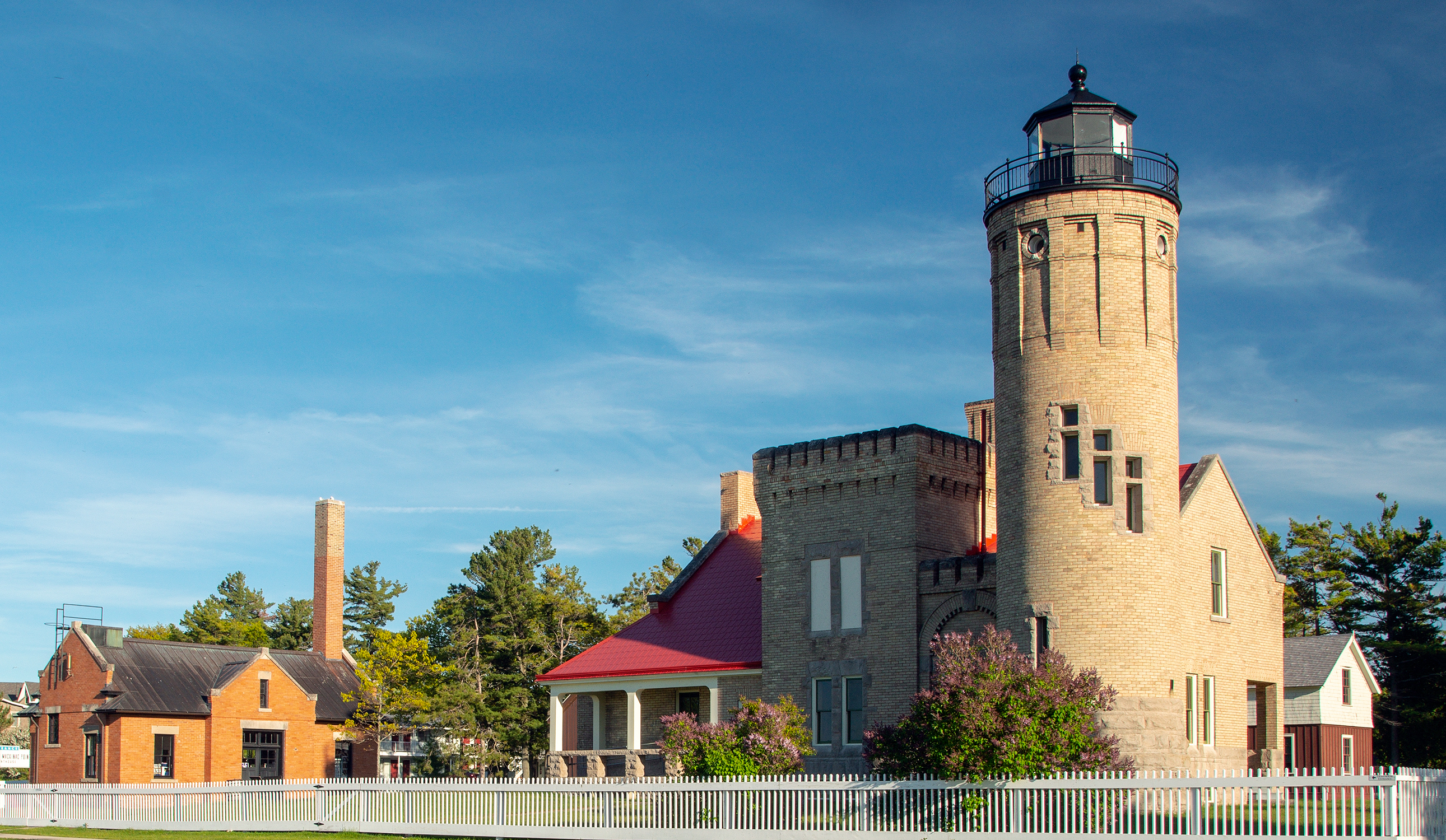
Old Mackinac Point Lighthouse

This site housed a French fort but that was compromised by the British and became their trading post system, stretching from the Mississippi River through the Illinois Country to the St. Lawrence River. The fort served as a supply for traders in the western Great Lakes.

The French had first established a presence in the Straits of Mackinac in 1671 when Father Jacques Marquette established a Jesuit mission at present-day St. Ignace, Michigan. In 1683, they augmented the mission with Fort de Buade. In 1701, Antoine Laumet de La Mothe, sieur de Cadillac moved the French garrison to Fort Detroit and closed the mission. By 1715, however, the French built Fort Michilimackinac to re-establish a presence along the Straits of Mackinac.

The French relinquished the fort, along with their territory in Canada, to the British in 1761 following their loss in the French and Indian War. Although British continued to operate the fort as a major trading post, the Ojibwe (Chippewa) in the region resented British policies as harsh. On June 2, 1763, as part of the larger movement known as Pontiac's Rebellion, a group of Ojibwe staged a game of bag'gat'tway (lacrosse) outside the fort as a ruse to gain entrance. After gaining entrance to the fort, they killed most of the British inhabitants and held the fort for a year before the British retook it.

The British eventually deemed the wooden fort on the mainland too vulnerable to attack, and in 1781 they built Fort Mackinac, a limestone fort on nearby Mackinac Island. Fort Michilimackinac was abandoned after the move.

The fort grounds were designated a National Historic Landmark in 1960. It is a popular tourist attraction as part of Colonial Michilimackinac in Mackinaw City. The site has numerous reconstructed historical wooden structures and is considered the most extensively excavated early French archaeological site in the United States, with ongoing excavations each summer. There are daily cannon and musket firing demonstrations performed by costumed interpreters. There are also accurate cooking demonstrations in which park visitors can participate.
