= Forrest J. Stimpson House =

Historic house in Michigan, United States

- U.S. National Register of Historic Places
- Michigan State Historic Site
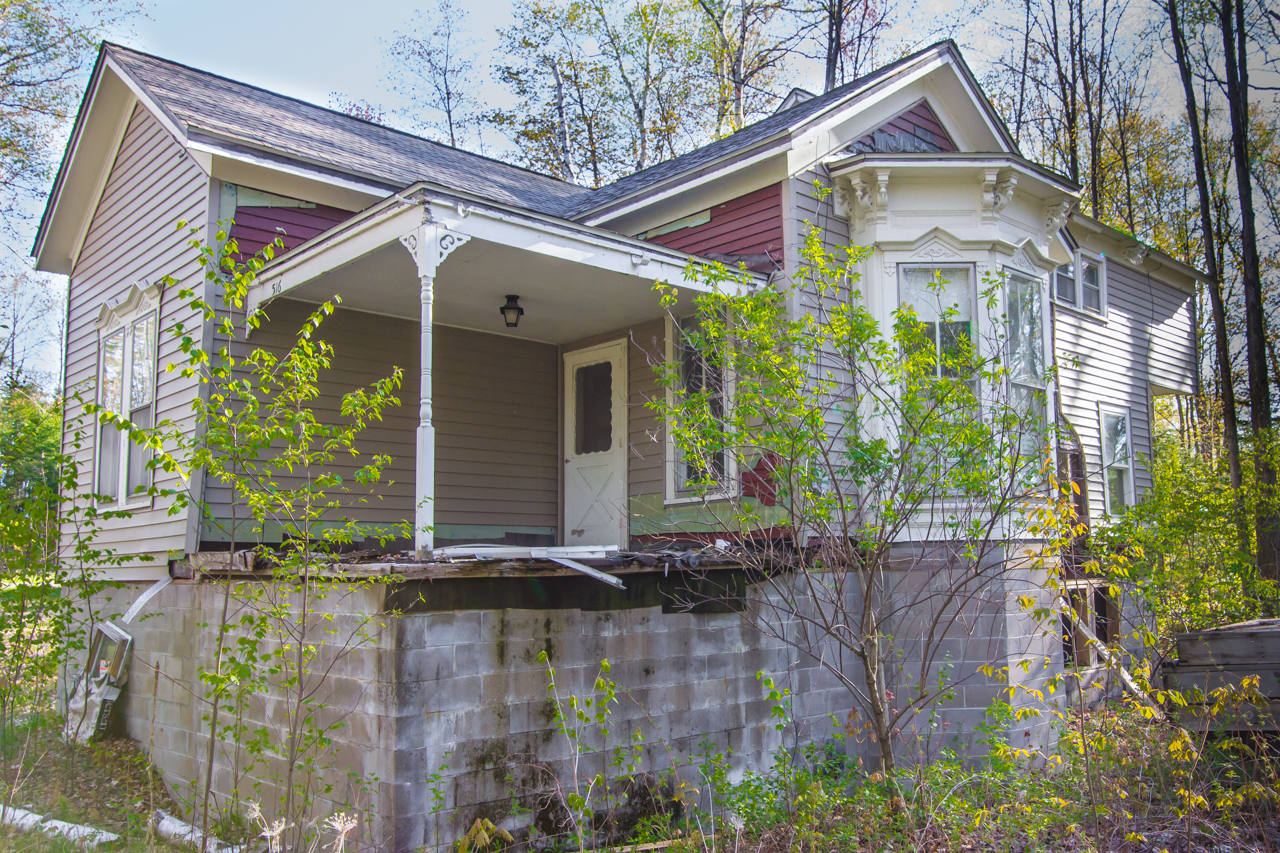

- Location within Michigan Location within the United States
- Interactive map
- Location: 566 Trails End Rd., Mackinaw City, Michigan
- Coordinates: 45°46′3″N 84°44′21″W
- Area: less than one acre
- Built: 1882
- Architectural style: Italianate
- NRHP reference No.: 80001849

Significant dates
- Added to NRHP: May 12, 1980
- Designated MSHS: February 23, 1978

The Forrest J. Stimpson House, also known as the Mackinaw City Marine Recording Station, is a private house that was located at 516 N. Huron Boulevard in Mackinaw City, Michigan; it has been moved from its listed location on Trails End Road. It was designated a Michigan State Historic Site in 1978 and listed on the National Register of Historic Places in 1980.

== History ==
Forrest J. Stimpson was the Mackinaw City postmaster and American Express agent. He constructed this house in 1882 at 516 N. Huron Boulevard in Mackinaw City. He also operated a marine recording station from his house along the lakeshore, recording the passage of vessels through the straits and contacting the appropriate shipping companies via Western Union to inform them of the ship's current location. Stimpson drowned in 1888 while delivering mail to a ship. His widow, Luella, remarried John Overton; in 1895 the couple constructed additions onto the front of the original house. An attached kitchen was constructed in 1912. The Stimpson House remained in private hands. At some point it was moved to it present location.

== Description ==
The Forrest J. Stimpson House is a two-story wood-frame house sided with clapboard. The original section, used as Stimpson's marine recording station, is a square, two-story building with a gable and a recessed entryway at one corner. The 1895 additions fronting the original building are single-story Italianate gable roofed sections, with brackets under the eaves, a bay window, and carved window framing. A cobblestone chimney is located near the bay window and a simple shed roofed porch shelters the entryway.
