= Cheboygan, Michigan =

- City
- City of Cheboygan
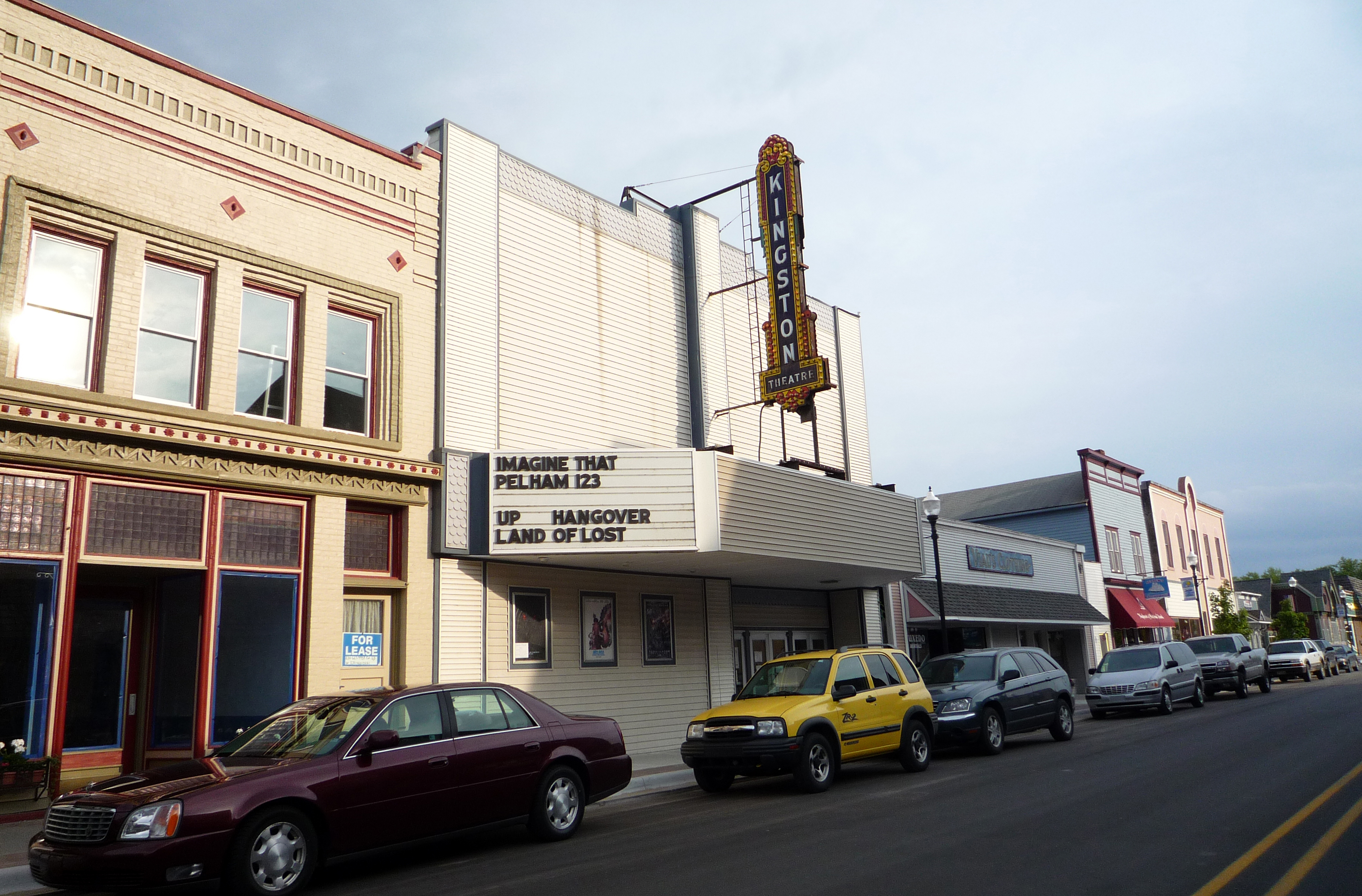
- Downtown Cheboygan along Main Street (M-27)

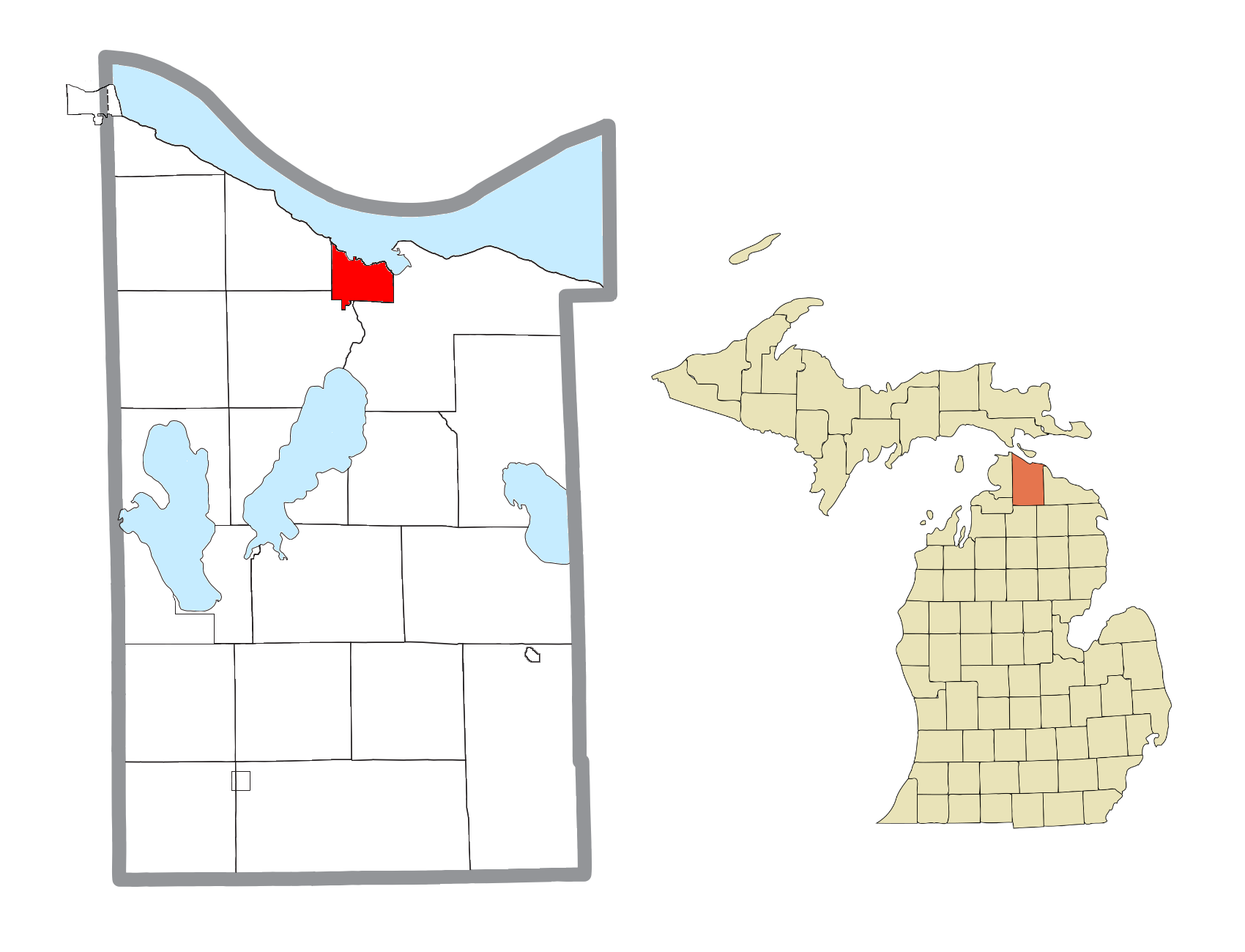
- Location within Cheboygan County

- Location within the state of Michigan Location within the United States
- Coordinates: 45°38′49″N 84°28′28″W
- Country: United States
- State: Michigan
- County: Cheboygan
- Settled: 1844
- Incorporated: 1871 (village); 1889 (city)

Government
  - Type: Council–manager
  - Mayor: Brett Mallory
  - Clerk: Alyssa Singles
  - Manager: Dan Sabolsky

Area
  - Total: 7.00 sq mi (18.12 km^{2})
  - Land: 6.86 sq mi (17.78 km^{2})
  - Water: 0.13 sq mi (0.34 km^{2})
- Elevation: 590 ft (180 m)

Population (2020)
  - Total: 4,770
  - Density: 695.34/sq mi (268.47/km^{2})
- Time zone: UTC-5 (EST)
  - Summer (DST): UTC-4 (EDT)
- ZIP code(s): 49721
- Area code: 231
- FIPS code: 26-15000
- GNIS feature ID: 0623135
- Website: Official website

Cheboygan (/ʃəˈbɔɪɡən/ shə-BOY-gən) is a city in the U.S. state of Michigan. It is the county seat of and the largest settlement in Cheboygan County. At the 2020 census, Cheboygan had a population of 4,770.

Cheboygan is situated on Lake Huron at the mouth of the Cheboygan River. It is the third-largest American city on Lake Huron after Port Huron and Alpena. Cheboygan is part of Northern Michigan, and is the northernmost city in Michigan's Lower Peninsula. Directly north of Cheboygan is Bois Blanc Island (part of Mackinac County), which can be accessed via ferry from Cheboygan.

== History ==
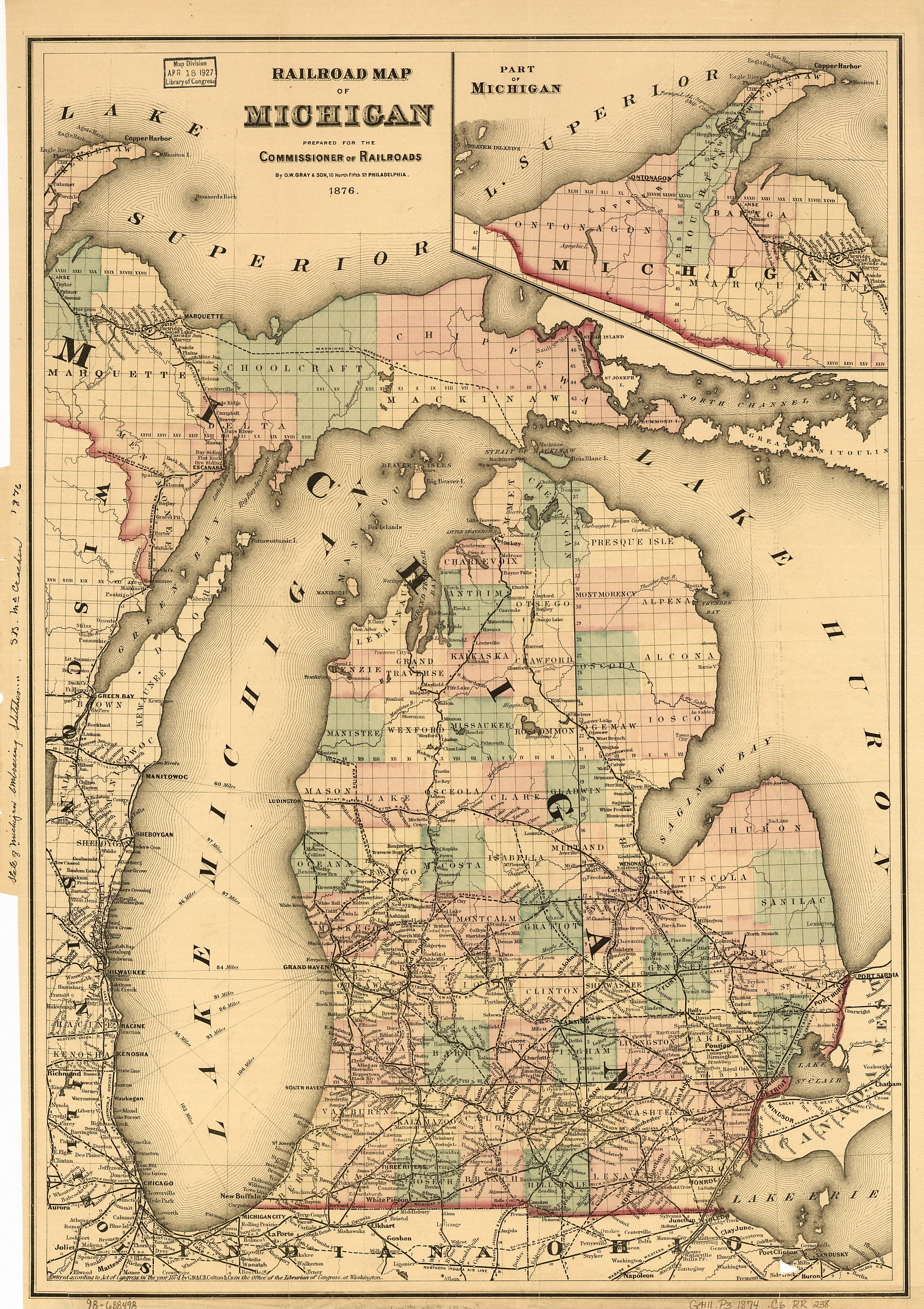
On this 1876 map, Duncan City is shown as a separate city east of Cheboygan in Cheboygan County.

Cheboygan was originally an Ojibwe settlement. In 1844, Jacob Sammons, a cooper from Fort Mackinac, chose the old native camping ground, known as Shabwegan, as the site for his cabin. He recruited other settlers, and a post office named "Duncan" was established in 1846. It was made the county seat in 1853.

Duncan or Duncan City was given a post office in 1850 as a result of the building of sawmills in this area. Duncan was made the county seat in 1853 and the location of the federal land office in 1855. The county seat shifted to Cheboygan in about 1870. Later Duncan was included within the expanded boundaries of Cheboygan.

The area became known as Cheboygan in 1870. It was incorporated as a village in 1871. Rail maps in 1876 show planned rail service for Cheboygan, but due to various setbacks, rail did not arrive there until 1881. There was a theater built in town in 1877.

Cheboygan was incorporated as a city in 1889.

In approximately 1890, Cheboygan became the home port for ferryboats to nearby Bois Blanc, an island in the Straits of Mackinac. Early in the 20th century, it was home to the pioneering brass era cyclecar maker, Flagler (de:Flagler Cyclecar).

In 1944, Cheboygan became the home port of the former U.S. Coast Guard cutter and icebreaker Mackinaw, serving from 1944 to 2006. Beginning in 2006, the port continued this role as the home dock of the new Mackinaw, a successor cutter.

=== Etymology ===
The name of the city shares the name of the county and probably has its origin from the Cheboygan River, although the precise meaning is no longer known. It may have come from an Ojibwe word zhaabonigan meaning "sewing needle". Alternatively, the origin may have been "Chabwegan," meaning "a place of ore."

== Geography ==
According to the United States Census Bureau, the city has a total area of 7.00 square miles (18.13 km^{2}), of which 6.80 square miles (17.61 km^{2}) is land and 0.20 square miles (0.52 km^{2}) is water.

=== Climate ===
The climate is described as Humid Continental by the Köppen Climate System, abbreviated as Dfb

Climate data for Cheboygan, Michigan (1991–2020 normals, extremes 1891–present)
Month	Jan	Feb	Mar	Apr	May	Jun	Jul	Aug	Sep	Oct	Nov	Dec	Year
Record high °F (°C)	59 (15)	62 (17)	86 (30)	90 (32)	93 (34)	96 (36)	103 (39)	104 (40)	97 (36)	89 (32)	78 (26)	64 (18)	104 (40)
Mean daily maximum °F (°C)	27.2 (−2.7)	29.0 (−1.7)	37.6 (3.1)	49.0 (9.4)	61.8 (16.6)	72.1 (22.3)	77.4 (25.2)	76.6 (24.8)	69.5 (20.8)	56.3 (13.5)	43.7 (6.5)	33.4 (0.8)	52.8 (11.6)
Daily mean °F (°C)	19.3 (−7.1)	19.7 (−6.8)	27.8 (−2.3)	39.5 (4.2)	51.5 (10.8)	61.9 (16.6)	67.6 (19.8)	66.8 (19.3)	59.5 (15.3)	47.6 (8.7)	36.6 (2.6)	26.9 (−2.8)	43.7 (6.5)
Mean daily minimum °F (°C)	11.4 (−11.4)	10.3 (−12.1)	17.9 (−7.8)	30.1 (−1.1)	41.3 (5.2)	51.7 (10.9)	57.7 (14.3)	57.0 (13.9)	49.5 (9.7)	38.9 (3.8)	29.5 (−1.4)	20.5 (−6.4)	34.6 (1.4)
Record low °F (°C)	−30 (−34)	−35 (−37)	−21 (−29)	−6 (−21)	10 (−12)	30 (−1)	32 (0)	29 (−2)	24 (−4)	13 (−11)	−6 (−21)	−21 (−29)	−35 (−37)
Average precipitation inches (mm)	1.80 (46)	1.32 (34)	1.76 (45)	2.78 (71)	2.88 (73)	2.89 (73)	3.11 (79)	3.30 (84)	3.36 (85)	4.09 (104)	2.60 (66)	2.08 (53)	31.97 (812)
Average snowfall inches (cm)	24.2 (61)	18.1 (46)	11.6 (29)	4.9 (12)	0.1 (0.25)	0.0 (0.0)	0.0 (0.0)	0.0 (0.0)	0.0 (0.0)	0.5 (1.3)	6.2 (16)	22.0 (56)	87.6 (223)
Average precipitation days (≥ 0.01 in)	15.7	11.5	10.4	11.5	12.4	10.7	11.2	10.4	12.8	16.3	14.9	15.2	153.0
Average snowy days (≥ 0.1 in)	12.3	9.0	5.3	2.1	0.0	0.0	0.0	0.0	0.0	0.1	4.2	10.3	43.3
Source: NOAA

== Demographics ==
Historical population
Census	Pop.	Note	%±
1880	2,269		—
1890	6,235		174.8%
1900	6,489		4.1%
1910	6,859		5.7%
1920	5,642		−17.7%
1930	4,923		−12.7%
1940	5,673		15.2%
1950	5,687		0.2%
1960	5,859		3.0%
1970	5,553		−5.2%
1980	5,106		−8.0%
1990	4,999		−2.1%
2000	5,295		5.9%
2010	4,867		−8.1%
2020	4,770		−2.0%
U.S. Decennial Census

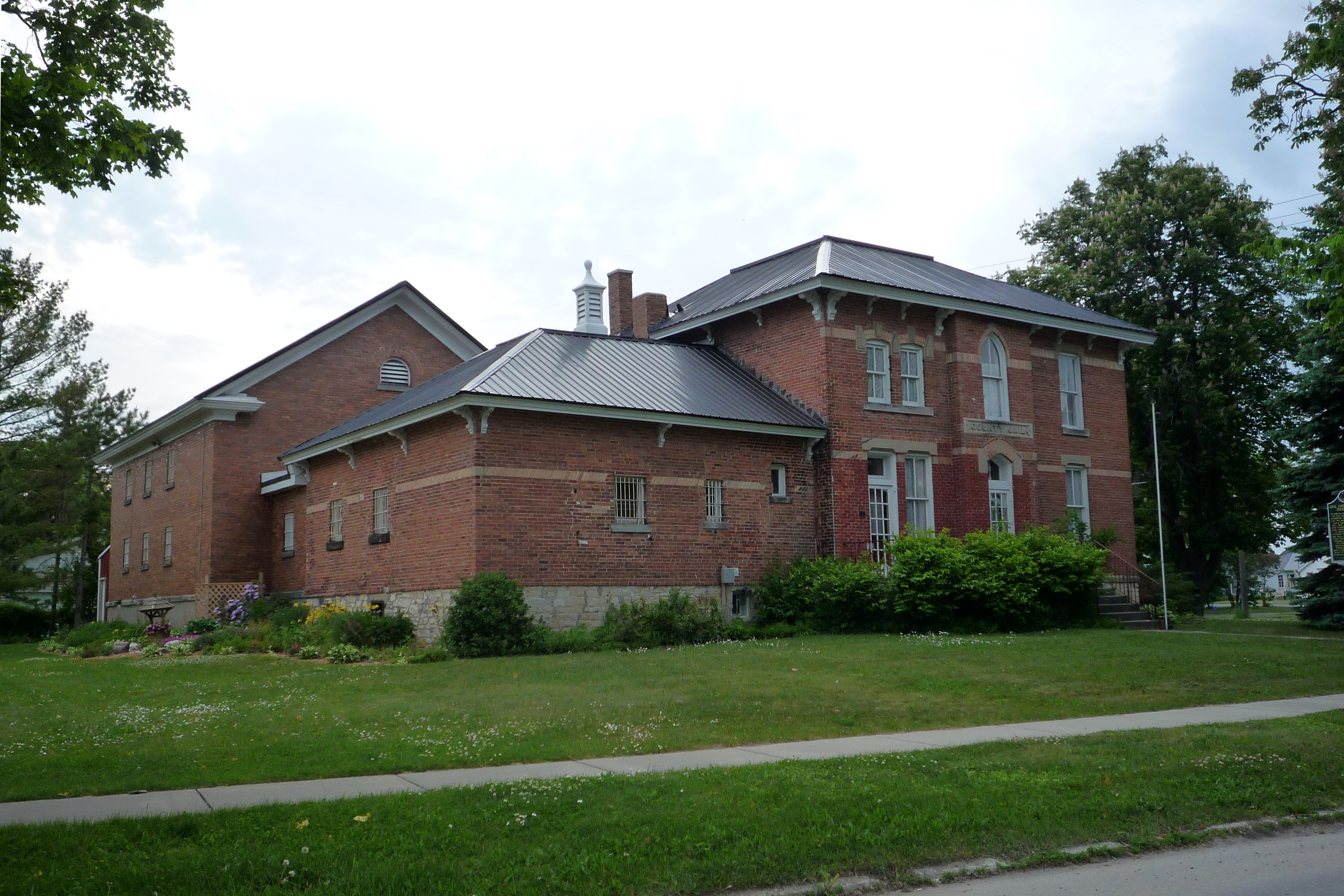
The Cheboygan County Historical Museum Complex, originally built as the Cheboygan County Sheriff Residence with attached jail cells (1882) and the New Jail addition (1912-14).

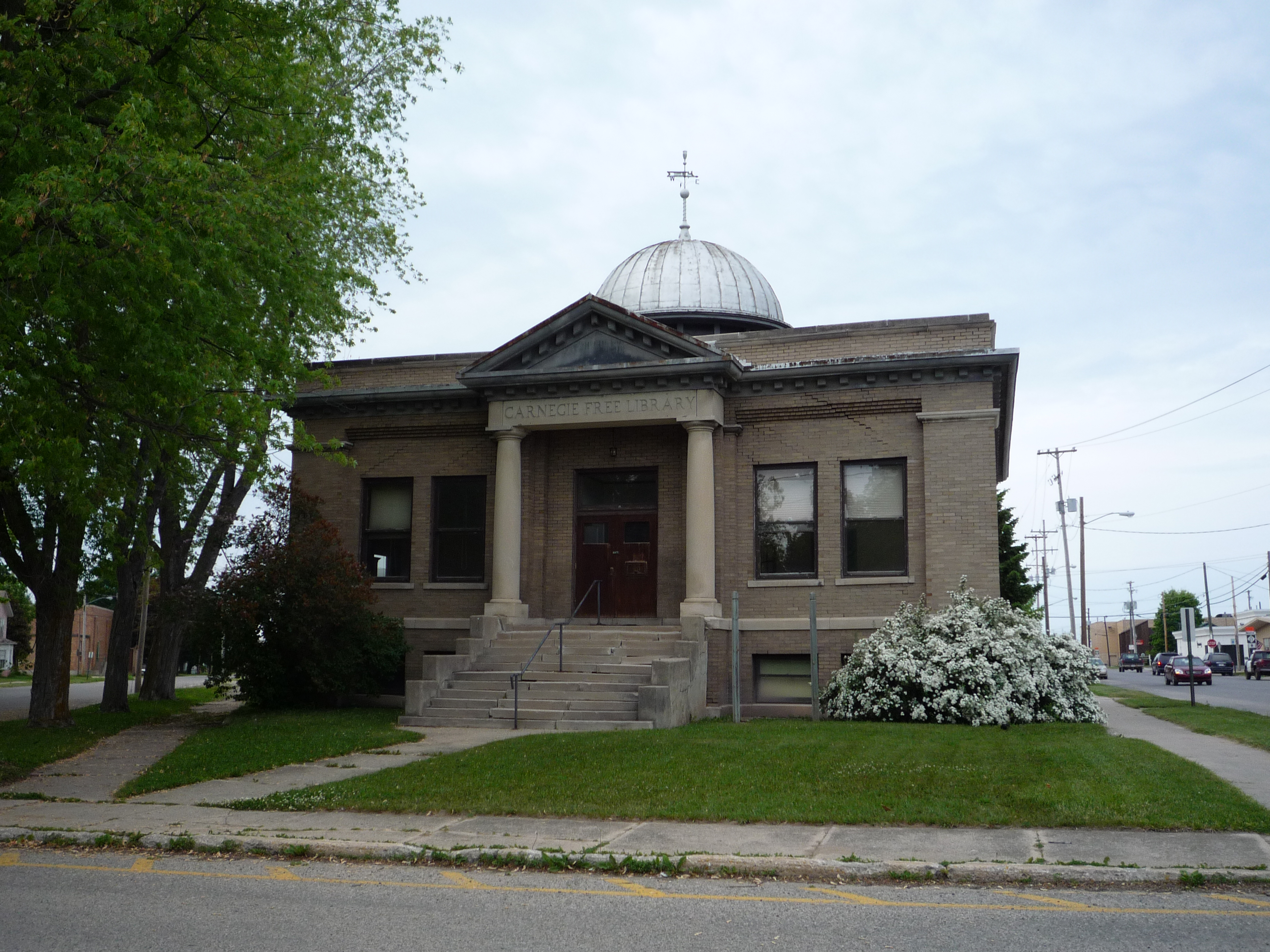
Carnegie Free Library building; the first building constructed in Cheboygan to serve specifically as a library. Steel magnate Andrew Carnegie donated $15,000 for the building in 1908. It was completed in 1913, and served as the city library until 1966.

=== 2020 census ===
As of the 2020 census, Cheboygan had a population of 4,770. The median age was 42.0 years. 20.5% of residents were under the age of 18 and 22.0% of residents were 65 years of age or older. For every 100 females there were 89.3 males, and for every 100 females age 18 and over there were 87.8 males age 18 and over.

92.3% of residents lived in urban areas, while 7.7% lived in rural areas.

There were 2,087 households in Cheboygan, of which 24.8% had children under the age of 18 living in them. Of all households, 31.9% were married-couple households, 21.8% were households with a male householder and no spouse or partner present, and 36.9% were households with a female householder and no spouse or partner present. About 38.7% of all households were made up of individuals and 18.2% had someone living alone who was 65 years of age or older.

There were 2,438 housing units, of which 14.4% were vacant. The homeowner vacancy rate was 3.5% and the rental vacancy rate was 7.2%.

Racial composition as of the 2020 census
Race	Number	Percent
White	4,036	84.6%
Black or African American	44	0.9%
American Indian and Alaska Native	222	4.7%
Asian	22	0.5%
Native Hawaiian and Other Pacific Islander	6	0.1%
Some other race	22	0.5%
Two or more races	418	8.8%
Hispanic or Latino (of any race)	102	2.1%

=== 2010 census ===
As of the census of 2010, there were 4,867 people, 2,025 households, and 1,164 families residing in the city. The population density was 715.7 inhabitants per square mile (276.3/km^{2}). There were 2,415 housing units at an average density of 355.1 per square mile (137.1/km^{2}). The racial makeup of the city was 90.8% White, 1.0% African American, 4.6% Native American, 0.2% Asian, 0.2% from other races, and 3.2% from two or more races. Hispanic or Latino residents of any race were 1.2% of the population.

There were 2,025 households, of which 28.3% had children under the age of 18 living with them, 36.7% were married couples living together, 15.2% had a female householder with no husband present, 5.6% had a male householder with no wife present, and 42.5% were non-families. 35.9% of all households were made up of individuals, and 16.1% had someone living alone who was 65 years of age or older. The average household size was 2.23 and the average family size was 2.84.

The median age in the city was 40.8 years. 22.1% of residents were under the age of 18; 10.3% were between the ages of 18 and 24; 22.6% were from 25 to 44; 26% were from 45 to 64; and 19% were 65 years of age or older. The gender makeup of the city was 47.9% male and 52.1% female.

=== 2000 census ===
As of the census of 2000, there were 5,295 people, 2,146 households, and 1,349 families residing in the city. The population density was 779.5 inhabitants per square mile (301.0/km^{2}). There were 2,365 housing units at an average density of 348.2 per square mile (134.4/km^{2}). The racial makeup of the city was 91.80% White, 0.51% African American, 4.12% Native American, 0.26% Asian, 0.02% Pacific Islander, 0.38% from other races, and 2.91% from two or more races. Hispanic or Latino residents of any race were 1.44% of the population.

There were 2,146 households, out of which 31.8% had children under the age of 18 living with them, 44.4% were married couples living together, 14.9% had a female householder with no husband present, and 37.1% were non-families. 31.6% of all households were made up of individuals, and 14.6% had someone living alone who was 65 years of age or older. The average household size was 2.35 and the average family size was 2.94.

In the city, 25.5% of the population was under the age of 18, 8.5% was from 18 to 24, 27.0% from 25 to 44, 20.4% from 45 to 64, and 18.6% was 65 years of age or older. The median age was 37 years. For every 100 females, there were 89.4 males. For every 100 females age 18 and over, there were 84.7 males.

The median income for a household in the city was $25,033, and the median income for a family was $32,692. Males had a median income of $28,417 versus $19,559 for females. The per capita income for the city was $14,318. About 15.8% of families and 19.9% of the population were below the poverty line, including 31.0% of those under age 18 and 9.1% of those age 65 or over.

== Education ==
Public education in Cheboygan is served by the Cheboygan Area Schools district. The city is home to Cheboygan High School.

== Tourist attractions ==
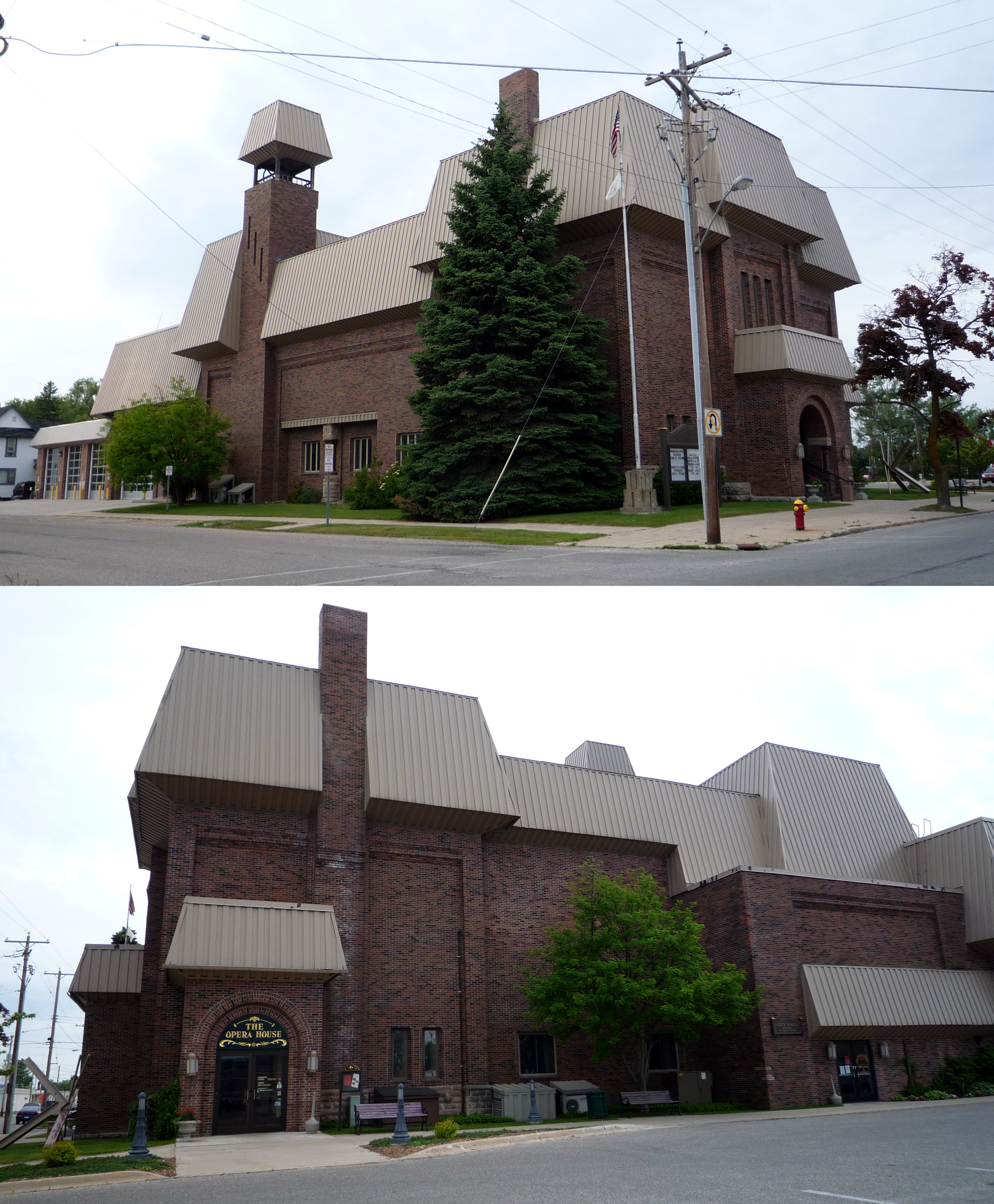
Opposite views of the Opera House, which now also houses the City Hall, police headquarters and fire station.

- Bois Blanc Island
- Cheboygan Crib Light
- Cheboygan State Park
- Opera House

== Media ==
The city and county are served by a daily newspaper, the Cheboygan Daily Tribune. A television station, WTOM-TV, is licensed to Cheboygan and maintains broadcast facilities along US Highway 23 south of the city, but this station operates as a satellite, with programming originating from parent station WPBN-TV in Traverse City.

== Transportation ==
=== State trunklines ===
- US 23 parallels the Lake Huron shore, running primarily east–west in Cheboygan, and can be used to access Rogers City and Alpena, both southeast of Cheboygan.
- M-27 is the primary north–south thoroughfare in Cheboygan, and can be used to access Interstate 75 and M-33, both south of Cheboygan.

=== County-designated highways ===
- C-64
- C-66
- F-05

=== Trails ===
- North Central State Trail
- North Eastern State Trail

=== Bus ===
- Indian Trails provides daily intercity bus service between St. Ignace and Bay City, Michigan. This route doubles as the Amtrak Thruway service for the area.

== Notable people ==
- George M. Humphrey, 55th United States Secretary of the Treasury
- Debbie Massey, golfer. Winner of three LPGA Tour events
- Scott Sigler, 1988 graduate of CAHS. Contemporary American author of science fiction and horror.
