= Sports in Memphis, Tennessee =

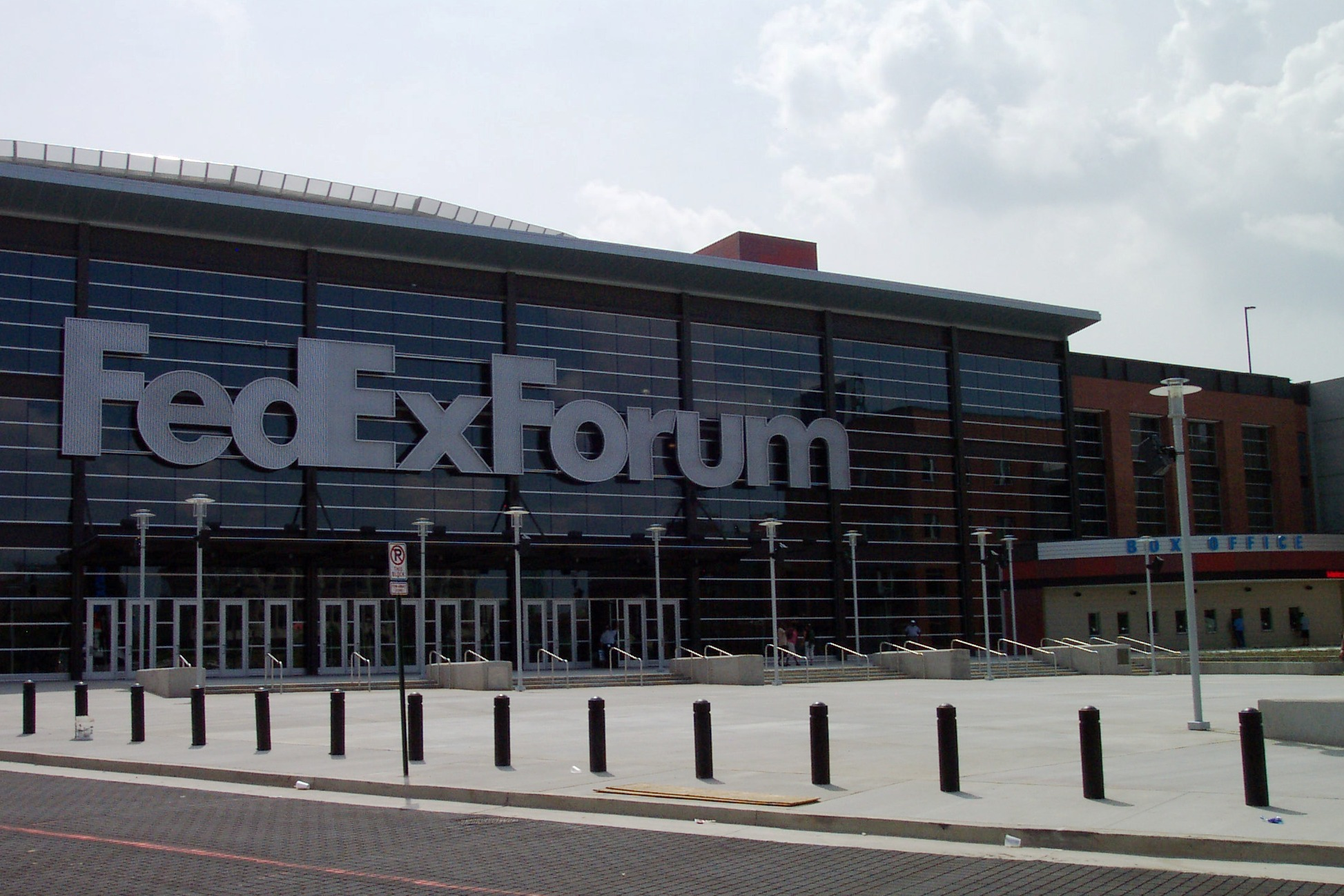
FedExForum, home of the Memphis Grizzlies and the University of Memphis Tigers basketball teams

Sports in Memphis, Tennessee, are supported in the city by Memphis Park Services, which offers a wide range of public facilities, including 17 swimming pools, 8 public golf courses, 48 athletic fields hosting a range of 510 youth and 269 adult teams, 130 basketball courts (101 outdoor and 29 indoor), 7 tennis centers and a soccer complex.

Memphis is also home to professional sports teams in basketball, baseball and other sports. Golf, basketball, baseball and tennis are popular recreational sports in Memphis.

== Overview of professional teams ==
=== Major league teams ===
Team	Sport	League	Venue
Memphis Grizzlies	Basketball	National Basketball Association	FedExForum

=== Minor league teams ===
Team	Sport	League	Venue
Memphis Redbirds	Baseball	International League	AutoZone Park
Memphis Hustle	Basketball	NBA G League	Landers Center (Southaven, Mississippi)
Memphis FC	Soccer	USL League Two	Mike Rose Soccer Complex

== Basketball ==
The Memphis Grizzlies of the National Basketball Association are the only team of the "Big Four" major professional sports leagues in the city. The team played at the Pyramid Arena from 2001 to 2004 and then moved to the FedExForum in downtown Memphis. The Grizzlies' NBA G League affiliate, the Memphis Hustle, plays its home games at the Landers Center in the suburb of Southaven, Mississippi.

The Memphis Tigers men's and women's teams represent the University of Memphis in NCAA Division I college basketball. The Tigers compete in the American Athletic Conference; the men share FedExForum with the Grizzlies and the women play home games on campus at Elma Roane Fieldhouse.

The Memphis Houn'Dawgs was an American Basketball Association (ABA) team based in Memphis, Tennessee. The team began play in the fall of 2000. The team played in the DeSoto Civic Center in Southaven, Mississippi, and only played the 2000-2001 ABA season before disbanding. The name was an apparent nod to the proposed NFL franchise team, the Memphis Hound Dogs (in turn, a nod to the song of the same name by Elvis Presley) which never got off the ground.

The Memphis Pros was an American Basketball Association (ABA) team based in Memphis, Tennessee. The team played from 1970 to 1972. After the 1972 season, the team was renamed the Memphis TAMS, with TAMS being an acronym for Tennessee-Arkansas-Mississippi. The Memphis TAMS played from 1972 to 1974. In the 1975 season, the team was renamed to the Memphis Sound.

== Baseball ==
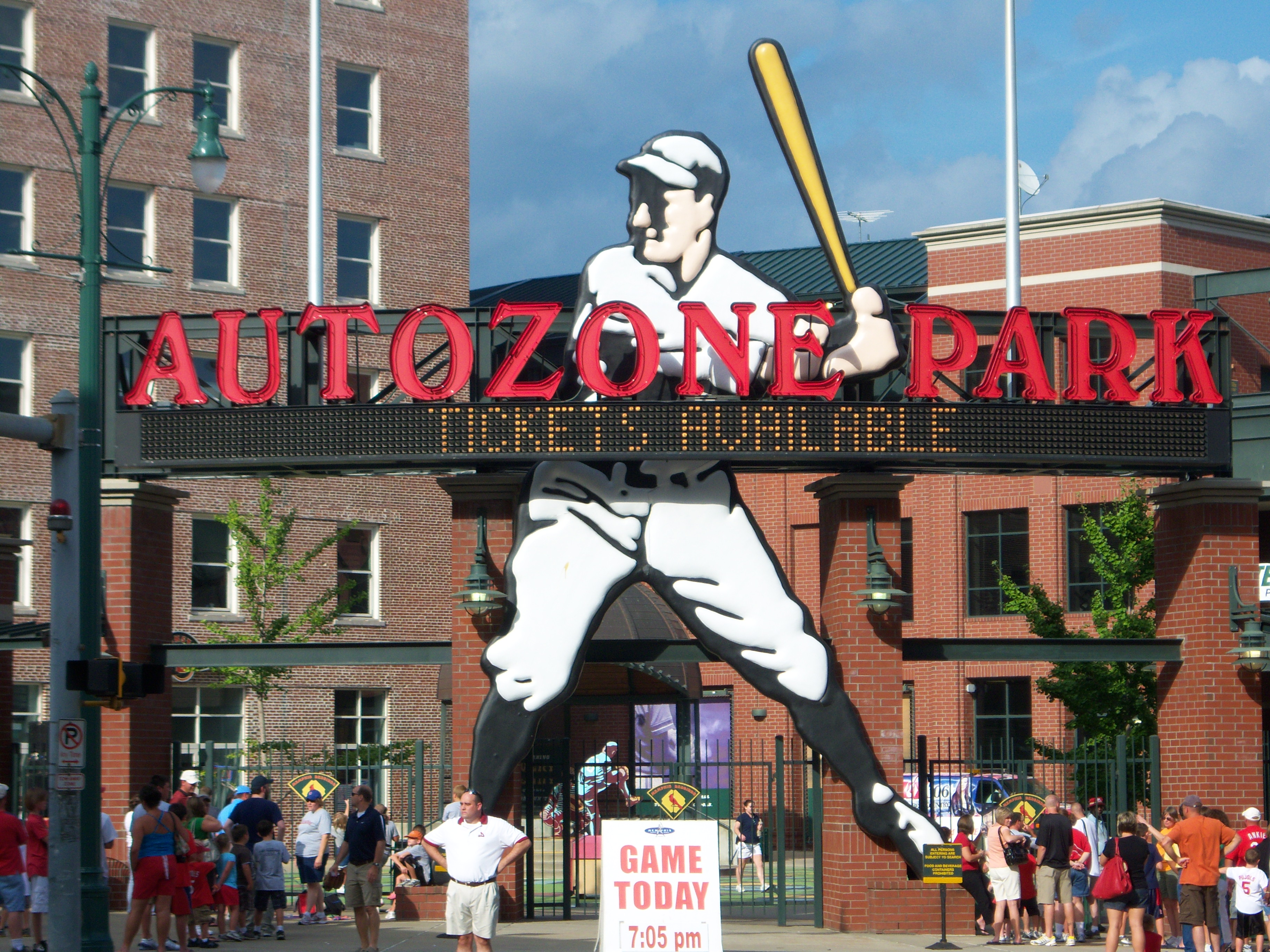
The entrance to AutoZone Park

Memphis has been home to several professional baseball teams since as early as 1877. The city's first Minor League Baseball team was the Memphis Reds of the League Alliance. In 1885, another team nicknamed the Reds joined the original Southern League. They were followed by the Southern League's Grays (1886), Browns (1887), Grays (1888), and an unnamed team in 1889. Later entries in the league were the Giants (1892), Fever Germs (1893), and Giants/Lambs (1894–95). Memphis fielded teams in the Southern Association from 1901 to 1960. They were known as the Memphis Egyptians (1901–1908), Turtles (1909–1911), and Chicks (1912–1960).

The Memphis Eclipses and Memphis Eurekas played in the Negro league Southern League of Colored Base Ballists in 1886. The Memphis Red Sox played in various Negro leagues in 1920 and from 1923 to 1950. The Memphis Blues competed in the Negro Southern League in 1947.

From 1968 to 1976, the Memphis Blues played in the Double-A Texas League (1968–1973) and the Triple-A International League (1974–1976). The Memphis Chicks played in the Double-A Southern League from 1978 to 1997. The city has been home to the Triple-A Memphis Redbirds, the top farm club of the St. Louis Cardinals, since 1998. They were members of the Pacific Coast League from 1998 to 2020. In conjunction with Major League Baseball's reorganization of Minor League Baseball in 2021, the Redbirds were placed in the Triple-A East, which became the International League in 2022. The Redbirds play their home games at AutoZone Park in downtown Memphis.

== Football ==
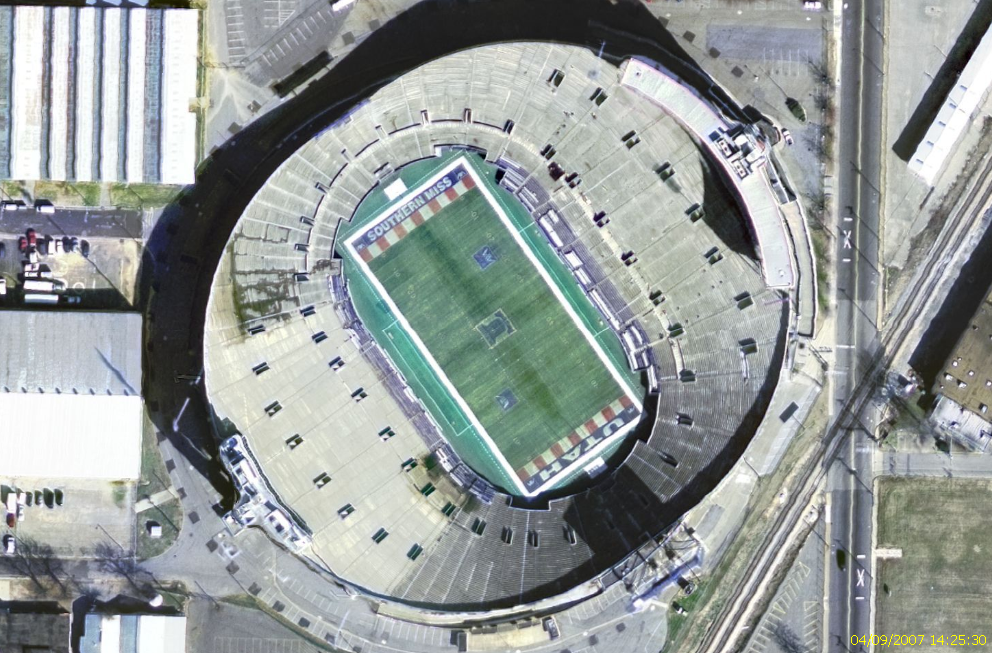
Liberty Bowl Memorial Stadium from the air.

The University of Memphis Tigers football team plays their home games in Liberty Bowl Memorial Stadium. The Memphis Kings is an amateur football team that plays in the North American Football League. The Panthers play at Robert Halle Stadium.

Memphis has hosted several professional football teams for brief periods over the years. The Memphis Tigers played there in the late 1920s and early 1930s. In more recent years the city has been host to teams from five different professional leagues. Memphis held a franchise, the Memphis Southmen, in the short-lived professional World Football League (1974–1975). The Memphis Showboats played in the United States Football League (1984–1985). The Memphis Mad Dogs were an expansion franchise of the Canadian Football League in 1995. The NFL's Tennessee Titans, formerly known as the Houston Oilers, relocated to Memphis for one season (as the Tennessee Oilers) in 1997 before moving to Nashville. Most recently the Memphis Maniax represented the city in the XFL (2001). Each of these teams called the Liberty Bowl their home field.

Memphis also saw indoor football in the forms of the Memphis Pharaohs in the Arena Football League (1995–1996) who played home games at Pyramid Arena, and the Memphis Xplorers in AF2 (2000–2006) who played their home games at DeSoto Civic Center in the nearby suburb city of Southaven, Mississippi.

In 2018, the Alliance of American Football announced the city's franchise team, the Memphis Express, would begin play in 2019 at Liberty Bowl Memorial Stadium.

== Golf ==
Golf is a very popular form of recreation in Memphis, which has eight municipal courses. The city's first public facility, Galloway Golf Course, was created in 1923. There are now over 30 public and private golf courses in the Memphis Metropolitan Area. Memphis is home to the annual FedEx St. Jude Classic, a regular part of the PGA TOUR.

== Ice hockey ==
The Memphis area is home to the Mid-South Monarchs, a minor league professional hockey team, who play in the Federal Prospects Hockey League at the Landers Center in nearby Southaven, Mississippi. The Mississippi RiverKings were a professional ice hockey team in the Central Hockey League and Southern Professional Hockey League from 1992 to 2018. The RiverKings also played at the Landers Center.

== Motorsports ==
Memphis is also home to Memphis International Raceway, just north of the city on the outskirts of Memphis and Millington, TN. The venue has a 3/4-mile (1207 m) paved oval track. It also has a 1/4-mile (402 m) drag strip, and road course. The complex is home to NASCAR, IHRA, and SCCA sanctioned events as well as locally sanctioned events that run from February to November.

Another racetrack in the Memphis metro area is Riverside International Speedway in West Memphis, Arkansas. It is a 1/4 mile dirt track that runs 305 winged sprints, late models, modifieds, 600cc mini sprints, and stock-cars. The Track opened June 10, 1950 making it one of the longest continuously operated tracks in the nation. It is the home track to 6 National Sprint Car Hall of Fame Members. Clarence "Hooker" Hood, Rick Hood, Sammy Swindell. Jeff Swindell. Bobby Davis Jr and Greg Hodnett.

Memphis area also has a very active Kart racing organization with Kart racing at Atoka Raceway Park and Coyote Run Arena in Mason

== Rugby ==
Memphis is also home to the Memphis Blues, a Rugby Union team, which plays at Tobey Field in Midtown, Memphis.

Memphis Women's Rugby is a women's senior club team (Rugby Union) which also plays at Tobey Field in Midtown, Memphis. The team is a member of USA Rugby South, Division II.

== Roller derby ==
Memphis has an active presence in the derby world courtesy of Memphis Roller Derby. The team is a sanctioned member of the Women's Flat Track Derby Association and competes in the South Central Region. The Memphis league has four home teams that compete in intra-league bouts, plus one travel team that competes in other cities.

== Tennis ==
Memphis Park Services maintains seven public tennis centers. Memphis is home to the Regions Morgan Keegan Championships and the Cellular South Cup. The Regions Morgan Keegan Championships is an ATP event, and the Cellular South Cup is a WTA event. The senior event, the Stanford Championships started in Memphis, but it has since relocated to Dallas, Texas.

== Wrestling ==
Memphis also has a fertile history when it comes to pro wrestling. The sport's greatest name to come out of the city is Jerry "The King" Lawler. Other greats who started out in Memphis include Hulk Hogan, The Undertaker, Stone Cold Steve Austin, The Rock, Mick Foley, "Macho Man" Randy Savage", and Ric Flair. Memphis has two pro-wrestling organizations, "Power-Pro Wrestling" which is filmed in the Cook Convention Center in downtown Memphis, and Memphis Wrestling which is filmed in the DeSoto Civic Center in Desoto County, Mississippi.

== Overview of collegiate teams ==
Team	Stadium
Memphis Tigers men's basketball	FedExForum
Memphis Tigers women's basketball	Elma Roane Fieldhouse
Memphis Tigers football	Liberty Bowl Memorial Stadium
Memphis Tigers baseball	FedExPark
Memphis Tigers soccer	Mike Rose Soccer Complex
Memphis Tigers softball	Tigers Softball Complex
Memphis Tigers golf	Frank L. Flautt Golf Center
Memphis Tigers tennis	Racquet Club of Memphis
Rhodes Lynx basketball	Mallory-Hyde Gymnasium
Rhodes Lynx football	Crain Field
Christian Brothers Buccaneers basketball	Canale Arena
Christian Brothers Buccaneers soccer	Signaigo Field
Christian Brothers Buccaneers baseball	Nadicksbernd Field
Christian Brothers Buccaneers softball	Bland Field

== Overview of defunct professional teams ==
Team	League	Season(s)	Stadium
Memphis Rogues	North American Soccer League	1978–1980	Liberty Bowl Memorial Stadium
Memphis Americans	Major Indoor Soccer League	1981–1984	Mid-South Coliseum
Memphis Showboats	United States Football League	1984–1986	Liberty Bowl Memorial Stadium
Memphis Storm	American Indoor Soccer League	1986–1990	Mid-South Coliseum
Memphis Storm	Southwest Indoor Soccer League	1990–1994	Shelby Farms Show Place Arena
Memphis RiverKings Mississippi RiverKings	Central Hockey League; Southern Professional Hockey League	1992–2018	Landers Center
Memphis Express	USL Professional Development League	2002–2005	Mike Rose Soccer Complex/Collierville High School
Memphis Express	Alliance of American Football	2019	Liberty Bowl Memorial Stadium
Memphis 901 FC	USL Championship	2019–2024	AutoZone Park
Memphis Showboats	USFL/UFL	2023–2025	Simmons Bank Liberty Stadium

Memphis has been represented by several now-defunct professional sports franchises, including the Memphis Pharaohs of Arena Football, the Memphis Maniax of the XFL, the Memphis Xplorers of the AF2, the Memphis Showboats of the USFL, the Memphis Southmen of the WFL, the Memphis Houn'Dawgs of the ABA, the Memphis Sounds of the original ABA in the late 1960s and early 1970s, and the Memphis Mad Dogs of the CFL.
