= Memphis Chicks (Southern Association) =

- 1901–1960; Memphis, Tennessee

Minor league affiliations
- Class: Double-A (1946–1960); Class A (1902–1945); Class B (1901)
- League: Southern Association (1901–1960)

Major league affiliations
- Previous teams: St. Louis Cardinals (1960); Boston Red Sox (1958); Chicago Cubs (1957); Chicago White Sox (1948–1956); Brooklyn Dodgers (1939)

Minor league titles
- Dixie Series titles (1): 1952
- League titles (1): 1952
- Pennants (8): 1903; 1904; 1921; 1924; 1930; 1933; 1953; 1955

Team data
- Previous names: Memphis Chickasaws (1912–1960); Memphis Turtles (1909–1911); Memphis Egyptians (1901–1908)
- Ballpark: Russwood Park (1901–1959)

The Memphis Chickasaws, or Chicks for short, were a Minor League Baseball team that played in the Southern Association from 1901 to 1960. They were located in Memphis, Tennessee, and played their home games at Russwood Park. Previously known as the Memphis Egyptians and Memphis Turtles, they were charter members of the Southern Association.

== History ==
Memphis was the home of several professional baseball teams since as early as 1877. The city's first Minor League Baseball team was the Memphis Reds of the League Alliance. In 1885, another Reds team joined the original Southern League. They were followed in that league by the Grays (1886), Browns (1887), Grays (1888), and an unnamed team in 1889. Later entries in the league were the Giants (1892), Fever Germs (1893), and Giants/Lambs (1894–95). The Memphis Eclipses and Memphis Eurekas played in the Negro league Southern League of Colored Base Ballists in 1886.

The Memphis Egyptians were established as charter members of the Southern Association in 1901. The league was originally a Class B circuit, but was reclassified as Class A (1902–1935), Class A1 (1936–1945), and Double-A (1946–61) over Memphis' 61-year membership. The Egyptians won the Southern Association pennant in 1903 and 1904. In 1909, the Egyptians became known as the Turtles.

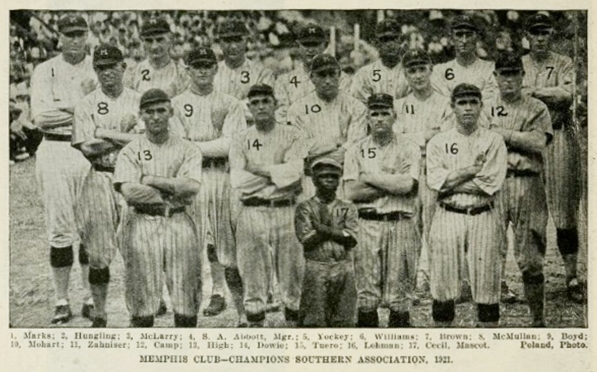
The 1921 Southern Association champion Memphis Chicks

In 1912, the club adopted its best-known and longest-used moniker, the Chickasaws, which was often shortened to Chicks. The Chickasaws won six pennants (1921, 1924, 1930, 1933, 1953, and 1955) and one playoff championship (1952). During this time, they competed in four Dixie Series, a postseason championship series between the champions of the Southern Association and the Texas League. They lost three series to the Fort Worth Panthers (1921, 1924, and 1930), but won the 1952 series against the Shreveport Sports, 4–2.

The Chickasaws' first Major League Baseball affiliation was in 1939 with the Brooklyn Dodgers. They were later affiliated with the Chicago White Sox (1948–1956), Chicago Cubs (1957), Boston Red Sox (1958), and St. Louis Cardinals (1960). Three Chicks won the Southern Association Most Valuable Player Award: Coaker Triplett (1937), Pete Gray (1944), and Ed White (1955). The 1921 and 1924 Chicks were recognized as being among the 100 greatest minor league teams of all time.

The Chicks suffered a major blow in the spring of 1960 when their venerable ballpark, Russwood Park, was destroyed by fire after an exhibition game between the Chicago White Sox and Cleveland Indians on Easter Sunday, April 17. The team played in temporary facilities, including a high school football stadium, for the rest of the season but drew only 48,000 fans. Mayor Henry Loeb tried to keep the team in Memphis, but the US$326,000 price tag for a new 7,500 seat ballpark was too much. On November 11, 1960, the franchise was forfeited to the league. In 1961, the Macon Peaches of Macon, Georgia, took Memphis' place in the circuit. After the 1961 season, the entire Southern Association shut down.

After the loss of the Chickasaws, Memphis became host to the Memphis Blues, a Double-A team of the Texas League, in 1968. The team played in a converted American Legion stadium that was renamed Blues Stadium. After six seasons, the Blues moved up to the Triple-A International League from 1974 to 1976, but folded after the 1976 season.

In 1978, a new Memphis Chicks team was created as an expansion franchise of the Double-A Southern League. They played their home games at Blues Stadium, which was renamed Tim McCarver Stadium in honor of Tim McCarver, a Memphis native, former Chickasaw, and major league ballplayer. They remained in Memphis through 1997. With the arrival of the Memphis Redbirds, a Triple-A Pacific Coast League expansion team, the Southern League Chicks franchise moved to Jackson and became the West Tenn Diamond Jaxx in 1998.

== See also ==
- Sports in Memphis, Tennessee

Preceded by Oklahoma City Indians	Boston Red Sox; Double-A affiliate 1958	Succeeded by Reading Red Sox (1963)
