= McGulpin Point Light =

Lighthouse in Michigan, United States

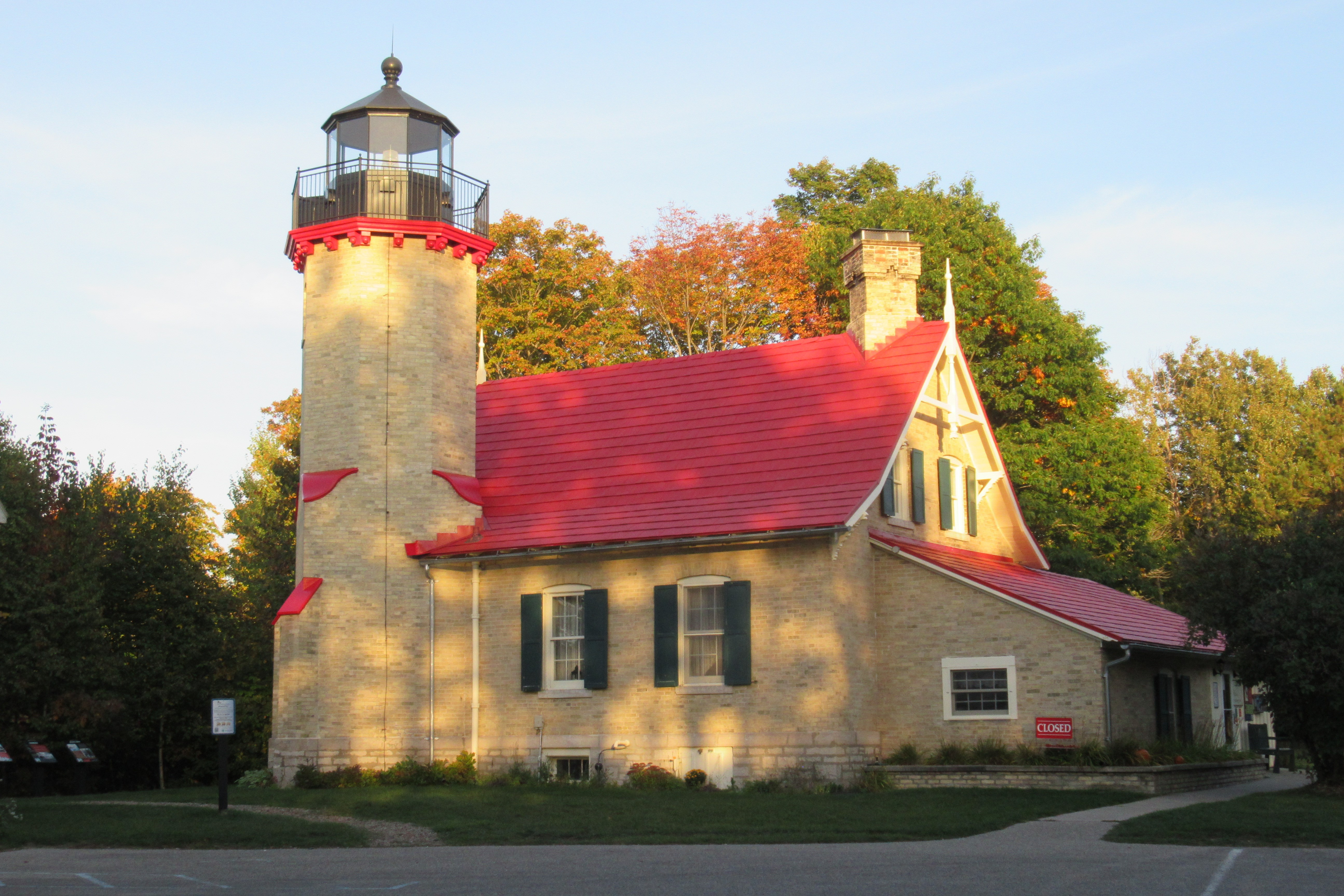
- McGulpin Point Light in October 2023
- Location: Straits of Mackinac, Michigan
- Coordinates: 45.78690°N 84.7722°W

Tower
- Constructed: 1869
- Construction: Cream City brick
- Height: 38 feet (12 m)
- Shape: Octagonal
- Markings: natural

Light
- First lit: 1869, 2009
- Deactivated: 1906
- Focal height: 102 feet (31 m)
- Lens: 3.5 order Fresnel lens
- Characteristic: Fl W 4s

McGulpin Point Light was constructed as a navigational aid through the Straits of Mackinac. The light began operation in 1869, making it one of the oldest surviving lighthouses in the Straits. In operation until 1906, the light is located on McGulpin Point (500 Headlands Road), approximately 3 miles (4.8 km) west of Fort Michilimackinac.

McGulpin Point Lighthouse & Historic Site has been owned by Emmet County since 2008 and the facility has been an official private Aid to Navigation on the NOAA chart map since 2009. Tours were available during the 2019 season for a small fee.

== History ==
=== Design and operation ===
The McGulpin Point Light, a true lighthouse with a light tower and attached lighthouse keeper's living quarters, was completed by the United States Lighthouse Board in 1869 at a cost of $20,000. The living quarters were built as a vernacular 1 1/2-story brick structure. The lighthouse operated during the Great Lakes navigation seasons from 1869 until 1906.

The design was so successful that the Lighthouse Board chose to use this 1868 design in the construction of Eagle Harbor Light in 1871; White River Light in 1875; and Sand Island Light in 1881. It is a "mirror image of the design" used at Chambers Island Light and Eagle Bluff Light in the "Death's Door" area. The design is sometimes called "Norman Gothic" style

James Davenport was the only lighthouse keeper at this light, and served for 27 years. Correspondence files in the National Archives in Washington show that Davenport made weekly trips through the snow to the lighthouse to report on its condition to the District Inspector in Milwaukee. Perhaps more importantly, these letters also show that he may have played a critical role in the opening of navigation every spring by reporting weekly, and sometimes even more frequently, on ice conditions in the Straits. Because Davenport was the only Straits keeper to submit such frequent reports, it would appear that the Inspector used these reports to gain an understanding as to when navigation would be open throughout the lakes.

=== Preservation ===
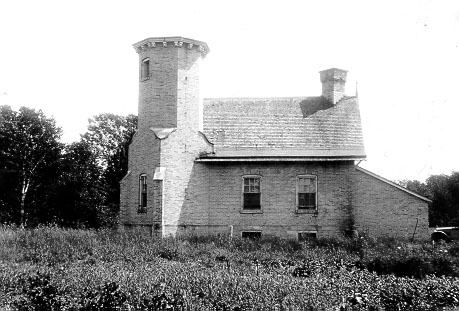
Historic image of McGulpin Point Light

In 1906, the McGulpin Point Light was deactivated and privatized due to the Lighthouse Board's judgment that the nearby Old Mackinac Point Light was performing an adequate job of marking the Straits of Mackinac. At some point after deactivation, the lighthouse tower's lantern room was removed, and the building passed into private ownership. The building then entered service as a private residence.

In 2005, the lighthouse and adjoining 11.5 acres (47,000 m^{2}) were placed on the market for an asking price of $1.75 million by the Peppler family. In early 2008, the price was $974,900. In June 2008. the governing board of Emmet County voted to purchase the McGulpin Point Lighthouse and 11.5 acres (4.7 ha) of surrounding lakefront property, including 336 feet (102 m) of Lake Michigan footage, and some adjacent property for visitor parking, for $720,000.

The county also allocated $25,000 for signs, plaques, a flagpole, and promotional materials to advertise and announce the lighthouse as a new historic resource of the Straits of Mackinac region. With the assistance of the Great Lakes Lighthouse Keepers Association and private donors, Emmet County authorities had the vanished lantern room rebuilt so that the McGulpin Point Lighthouse could resume its function as a lighthouse. In April 2009, a "replica lantern room, fabricated by Moran Iron Works in Onaway, Michigan, was placed atop" the light, and a lantern was erected in the lantern room. The McGulpin Point Light was ceremonially relighted on May 30, 2009.

Approximately 1,200 celebrants attended the May 2009 festival and relighting ceremony. An invocation by Frank Ettawageshik, of the Little Traverse Bay Bands of Odawa Indians, was followed by a "stirring performance by four Native American drummers." The official relighting was switched on by United States Senator Debbie Stabenow and James Tamlyn, Emmet County Board of Commissioners chairman.

=== Current status ===
Unlike the Old Mackinaw Point Lighthouse, the McGulpin Point Lighthouse was not yet listed on the National Register of Historic Places as of 2019; nor was it listed on the state inventory. It has been owned by Emmet County since 2008.

In 2009, the McGulpin lighthouse was staffed in summer by unpaid volunteers. No admission fee was charged at that, but donations were accepted. Admittance to the lighthouse and tower included access to the original light tower and replica lantern room atop the original tower. It was also possible to do a seaplane tour of the Mackinac Straits to see the lights in the area.

Since May 30, 2009, McGulpin has operated as a private Aid to Navigation on the NOAA chart map. That approval was given after the installation of a replica decagonal lantern. The 2009 McGulpin Point Light lantern, a single-flash white light with a duration of 3.0 seconds, was visible to mariners in the Straits of Mackinac.

During the 2019 season, tours of McGulpin Point Lighthouse & Historic Site were available at $3 per person. Overnight accommodations at the McGulpin Point Cottage on the grounds were also offered.

== See also ==
- Lighthouses in the United States
