= Memphis Reds =

Memphis Reds may refer to:

- Memphis Reds (League Alliance), a Minor League Baseball team that played in 1877
- Memphis Reds (Southern League), a Minor League Baseball team that played in 1885
