= Minneapolis Browns =

- 1877; Minneapolis, Minnesota

Minor league affiliations
- Class: Independent (1877)
- League: League Alliance (1877)

Major league affiliations
- Team: None

Minor league titles
- League titles (0): None

Team data
- Name: Minneapolis Browns (1877)
- Ballpark: Athletic Park (1877)

The Minneapolis Browns were a minor league baseball team based in Minneapolis, Minnesota. In 1877, the Minneapolis Browns played as members of the League Alliance, hosting home games at Athletic Park.

== History ==
Minor league baseball began in Minneapolis, Minnesota in 1877 when the Minneapolis "Browns" became members of the League Alliance. The League Alliance affiliation allowed Independent clubs to align with National League teams, while playing individual schedules. The Browns had been preceded in Minneapolis by the semi–professional Minneapolis Blue Stockings.

In January 1877, the St. Louis Globe-Democrat published a proposal from Al Spalding, manager of the Chicago White Stockings club of the National League. Spalding proposed that select Independent clubs affiliate with the League Alliance to secure their player contracts. This was completed by franchises informing the Secretary of the League of contracts, agreeing to play games by National League rules and abiding by the decision of the League Alliance regarding disputes. Copies of the agreement were reportedly sent to select Independent teams. On February 4, 1877, it was reported that Indianapolis Blues and Milwaukee Cream Citys had signed the League Alliance agreement, followed by the St. Paul Red Caps, Memphis Red Stockings, Chicago Fairbanks and Brooklyn Chelseas. Other teams subsequently signing the League Alliance agreement were the Binghamton Crickets and Syracuse Stars, Lowell, Minneapolis Browns, Philadelphia Athletics, the Mutuals of Janesville, Wisconsin and Fall River Cascades.

National League secretary Nick Young announced in May 1877, that "league alliance games will not be computed in the official averages." The thirteen franchises are generally recognized as members of the League Alliance. These were the teams represented in "standings" first printed in the Indianapolis Sentinel and New York Clipper in June, 1877 and later the Chicago Tribune.

The Minneapolis use of the "Browns" moniker corresponded with their brown stirrups on their uniform.

Beginning play on April 21, 1877, the League Alliance teams played against various local teams as well as other teams in the League Alliance. In July, 1877, the Browns played against the Chicago White Stockings, with Chicago sweeping the games. By the end of the season, all players on the Minneapolis roster were professional players who were under contract.

The Minneapolis Browns ended the 1877 season with a League Alliance record of 20–23, playing under manager F.W. Chase. The Browns had the seventh best win percentage of the League Alliance teams, who played varying numbers of games against other League Alliance teams. Brothers Bill Gleason and Jack Gleason played together on the 1877 Browns.

After the 1877 season, the Minneapolis Browns played in various seasons as a semi–professional team.

In 1884, minor league baseball resumed in Minneapolis, when the Minneapolis Millers franchise began play as members of the Northwestern League.

== The ballpark ==
The home minor league ballpark for the Minneapolis Browns was Athletic Park. The ballpark was located on 8th Street in south Minneapolis.

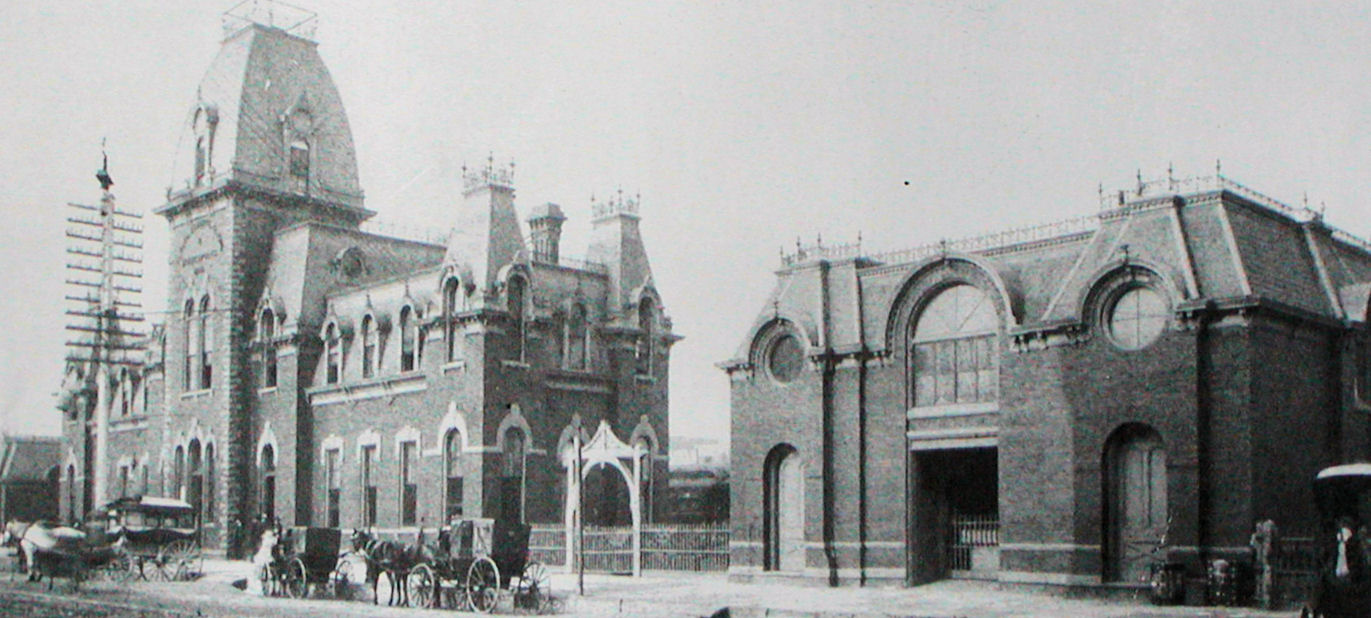
(1878) Milwaukee Road Railroad station. Minneapolis, Minnesota.

== Year–by–year record ==
Year	Record	Finish	Manager	Playoffs/Notes
1877	20–23	7th	F.W. Chase	Alliance standings by win %

== Notable alumni ==
- Mike Brannock (1877)
- Dory Dean (1877)
- Charlie Eden (1877)
- Bill Gleason (1877)
- Jack Gleason (1877)
- Sonny Hoffman (1877)
- Dan O'Leary (1877)
- Bill Phillips (1877)

== See also ==
- Minneapolis Browns players
