= Cream City brick =

Distinctive type of brick from Milwaukee, Wisconsin

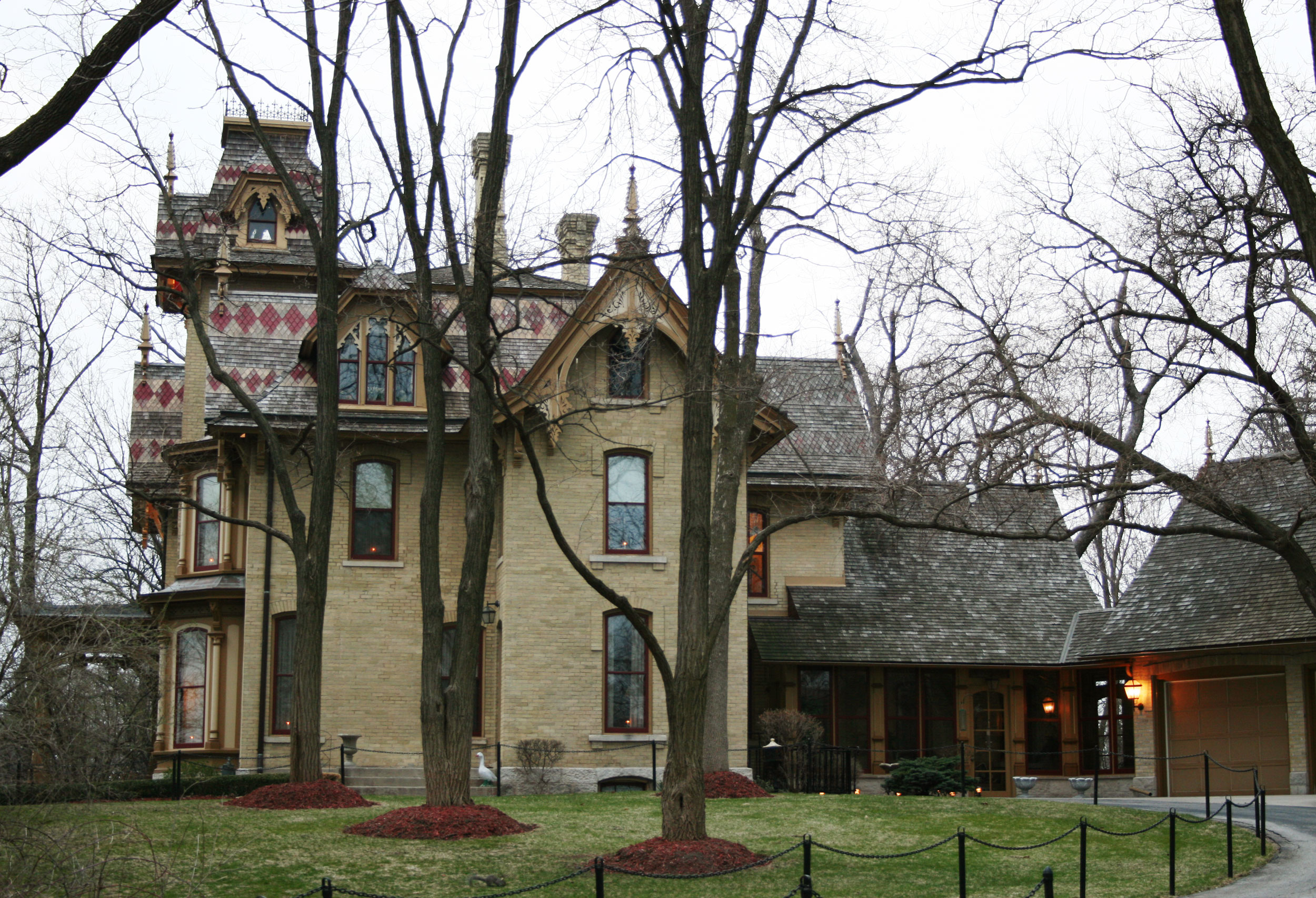
Dr. Fisk Holbrook Day House, located in Wauwatosa, Wisconsin, shows the restored color of Cream City brick.

Cream City brick is a cream or light yellow-colored brick made from a clay constructed around Milwaukee, Wisconsin, in the Menomonee River Valley and on the western banks of Lake Michigan. These bricks were one of the most common building materials used in Milwaukee during the mid and late 19th century, giving the city the nickname "Cream City" and the bricks the name "Cream City bricks".

== Characteristics ==
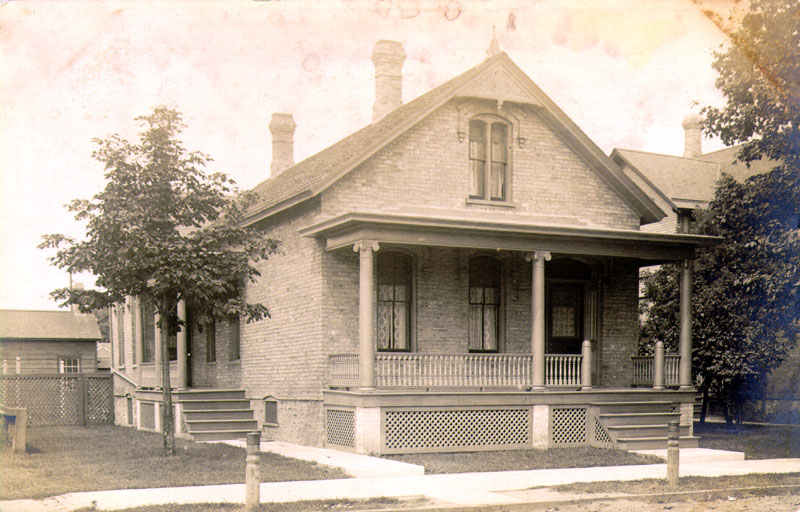
Cottage in Racine, Wisconsin, 1910

Cream City bricks are made from dolomitic glacial clay containing elevated amounts calcium and magnesium; this clay is common in regions of Wisconsin, especially near Milwaukee. When the bricks are fired, they become creamy-yellow in color.

Although light-colored when first made, Cream City bricks are porous, causing them to absorb dirt and other pollutants; this tends to make structures constructed out of them dark-colored as time passes. Once Cream City bricks absorb pollutants, they are difficult to clean, a problem which restoration experts in Milwaukee have been facing since the 1970s. Initially, sandblasting was attempted; however, it not only proved to be ineffective, but damaged the bricks. Currently, chemical washes are accepted as the most effective method of cleaning Cream City bricks. The historic Trimborn Farmhouse in Greendale, Wisconsin, is an example of brick that has been cleaned to reveal its original color.

== Structures built with Cream City brick ==
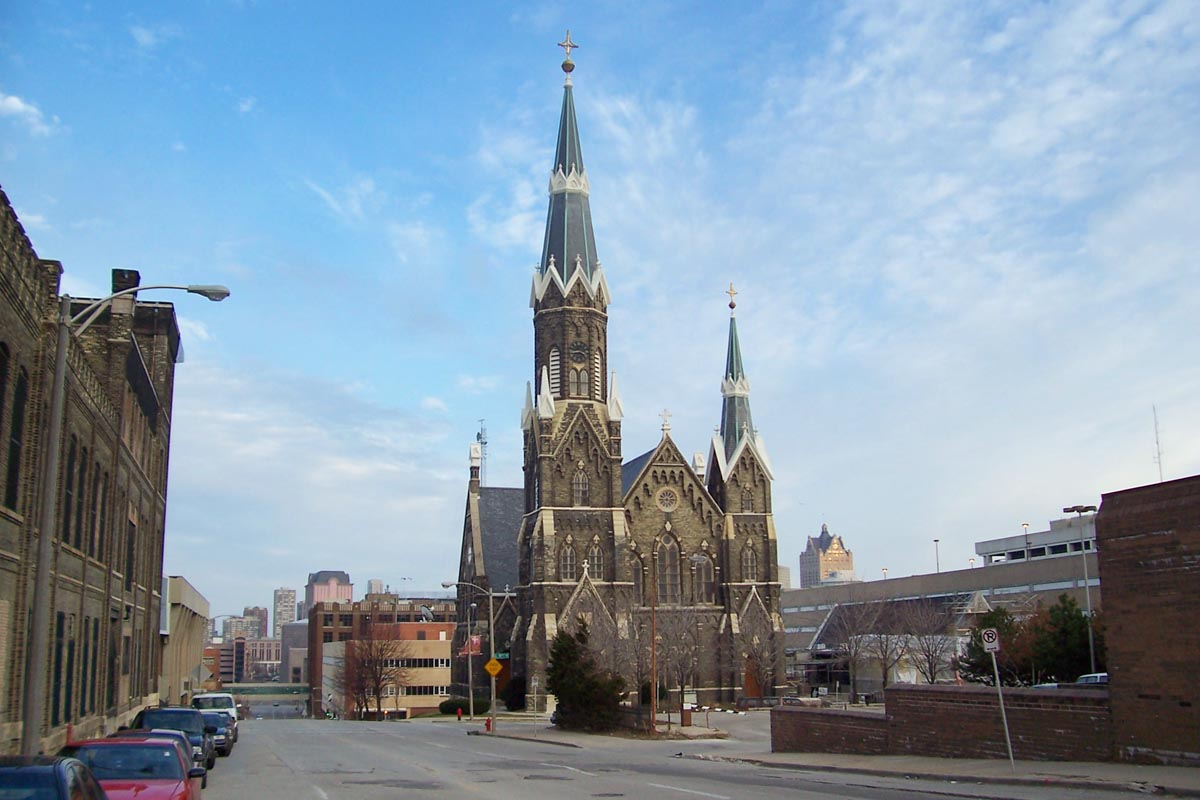
Trinity Evangelical Lutheran Church, in Milwaukee, Wisconsin, is an example of a building constructed with Cream City brick, though its cream color has been darkened by the elements.

Cream City bricks are well known for their durability; many buildings constructed with them in the 19th century still stand today. An example of the durability of Cream City brick is Trinity Evangelical Lutheran Church, which was built more than 125 years ago. However, since there were numerous brickmakers in the area, brick quality varied. Some bricks were not manufactured properly. Big Sable Point Lighthouse was constructed of Cream City brick. But it had degraded so much in 35 years that it had to be encased in iron plating. Grosse Point Light, also made of Cream City brick, had to be encased in concrete.

Because the regional headquarters of the United States Lighthouse Board responsible for building lighthouses around Lake Michigan was located in Milwaukee, many of them are built with Cream City bricks, including Kenosha Light, the Eagle Bluff Lighthouse, the McGulpin Point Light, and the Old Mackinac Point Light.

St. Mary's Catholic Church (1846), the National Soldiers Home (main building; 1867), St. Stanislaus (1873), and Milwaukee Turner Hall (1882) are all Milwaukee city monuments that were constructed using these local bricks that are still standing today.

Cream City bricks were widely exported, making their way not only to American cities such as Chicago and New York, but also to western Europe, including Hamburg, Germany.

== Sports ==
- A National League baseball team which played in Milwaukee in 1878 was commonly known as the Cream Citys.
- The National Basketball Association (NBA)'s Milwaukee Bucks use Cream City cream as an official club color, starting with the 2015–16 NBA season.
- Starting in 2020, Major League Baseball's Milwaukee Brewers made their main home uniforms a similar Cream City cream, and one of their alternative logo patches has the state of Wisconsin with a "Cream City brick" pattern.

== Gallery ==
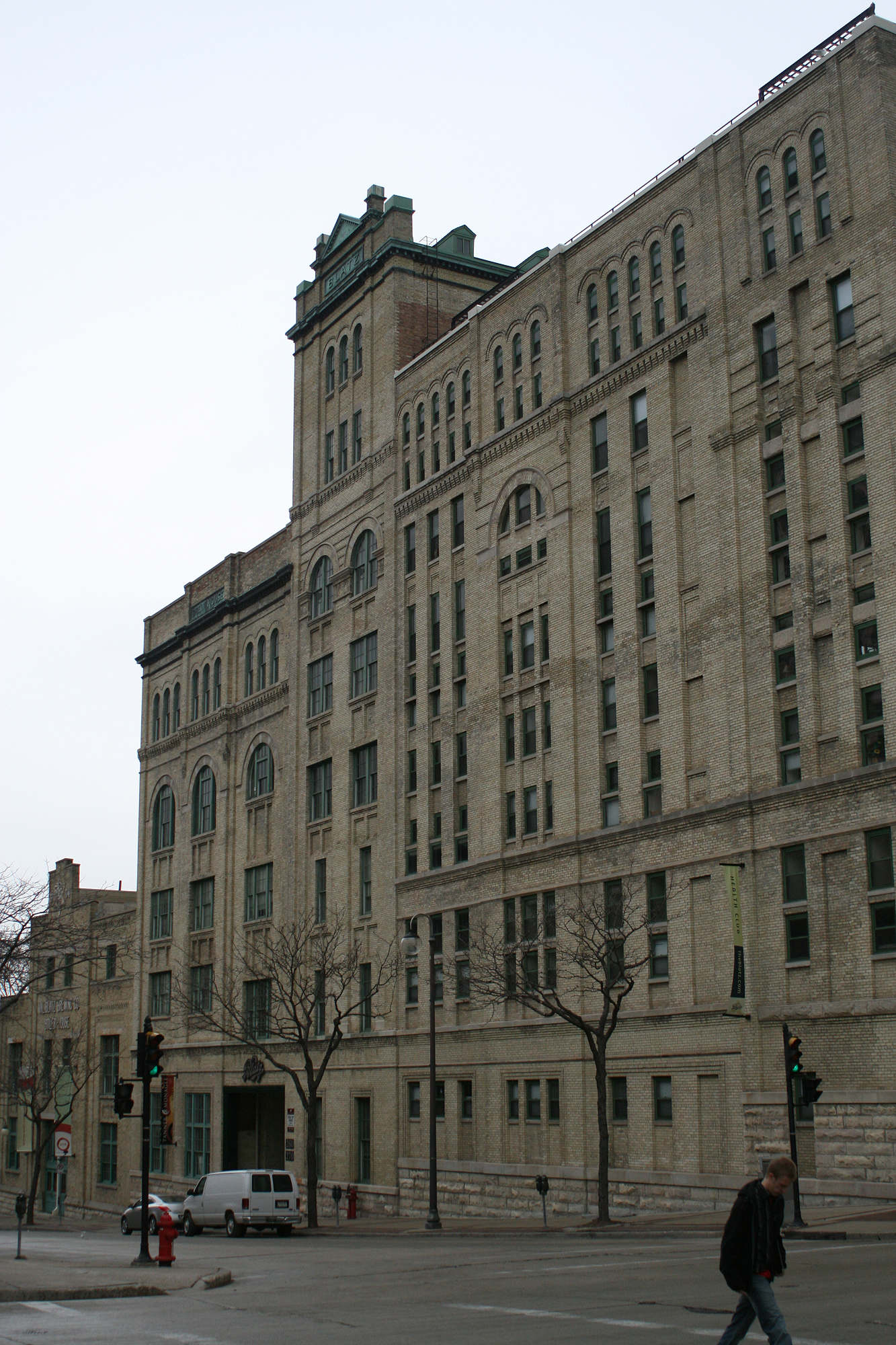
Valentin Blatz Brewing Company Office Building

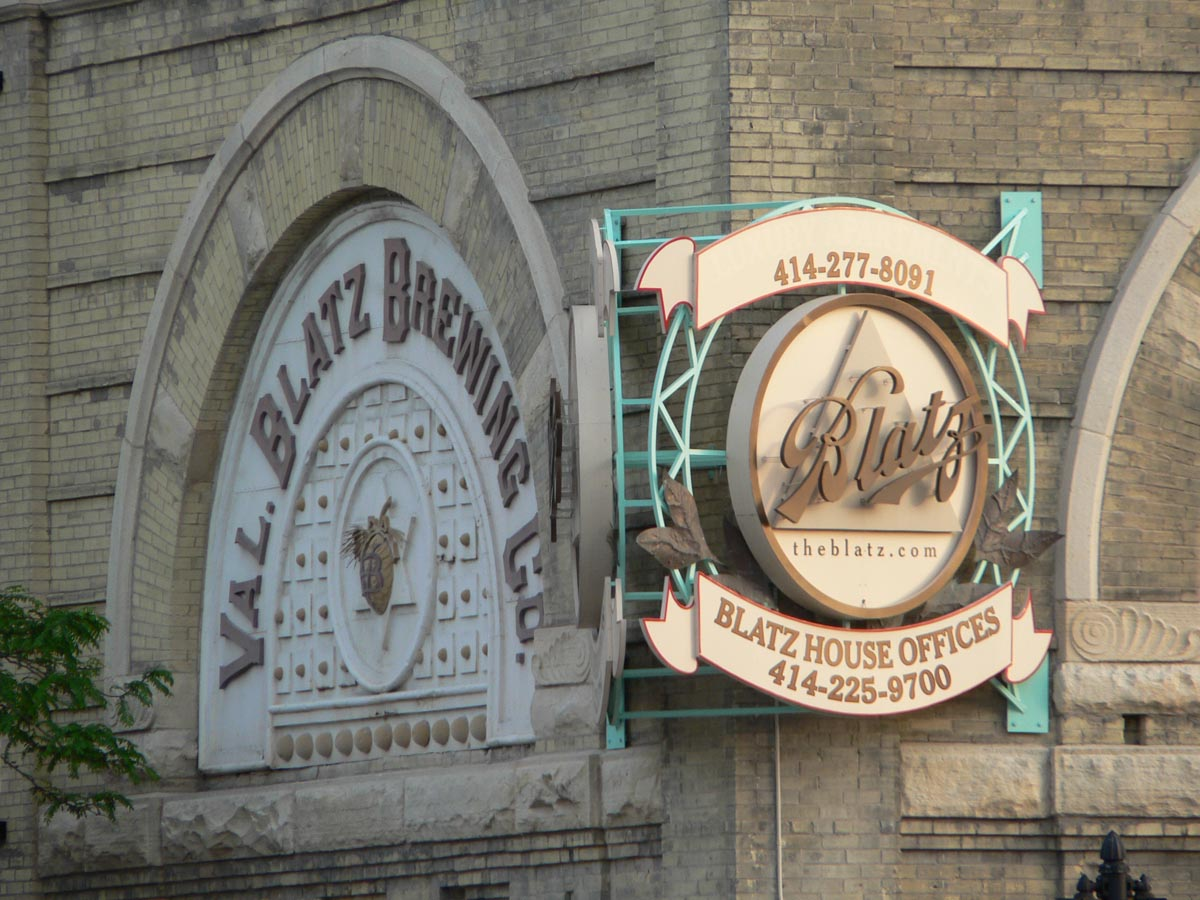
Building detail showing Cream City brick from the Valentin Blatz Brewing Company Complex in downtown Milwaukee, Wisconsin

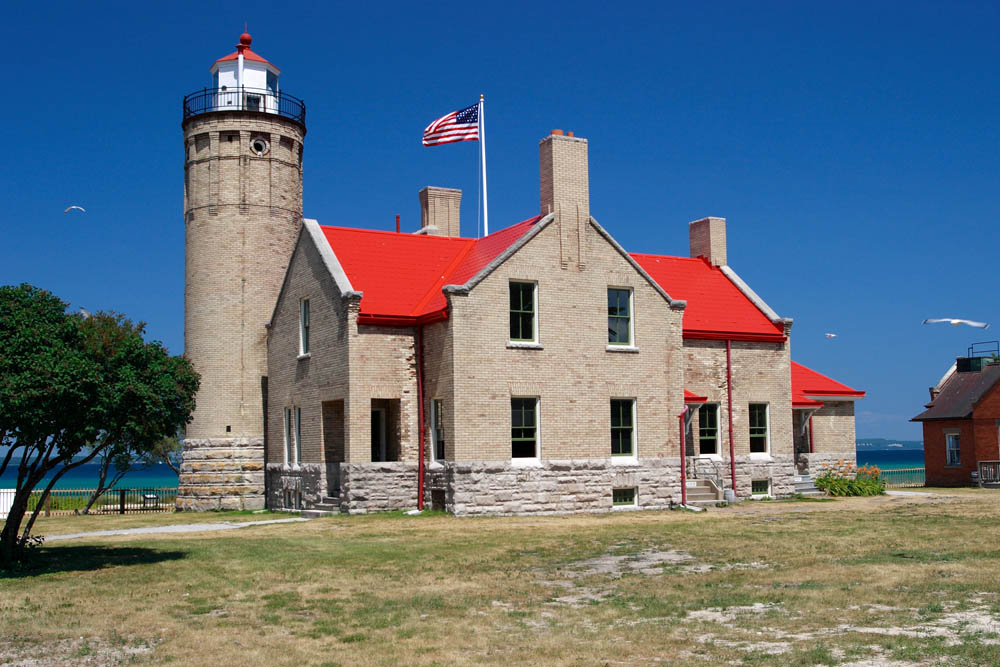
Old Mackinac Point Light, a non-Milwaukee use of Cream City brick built in 1892

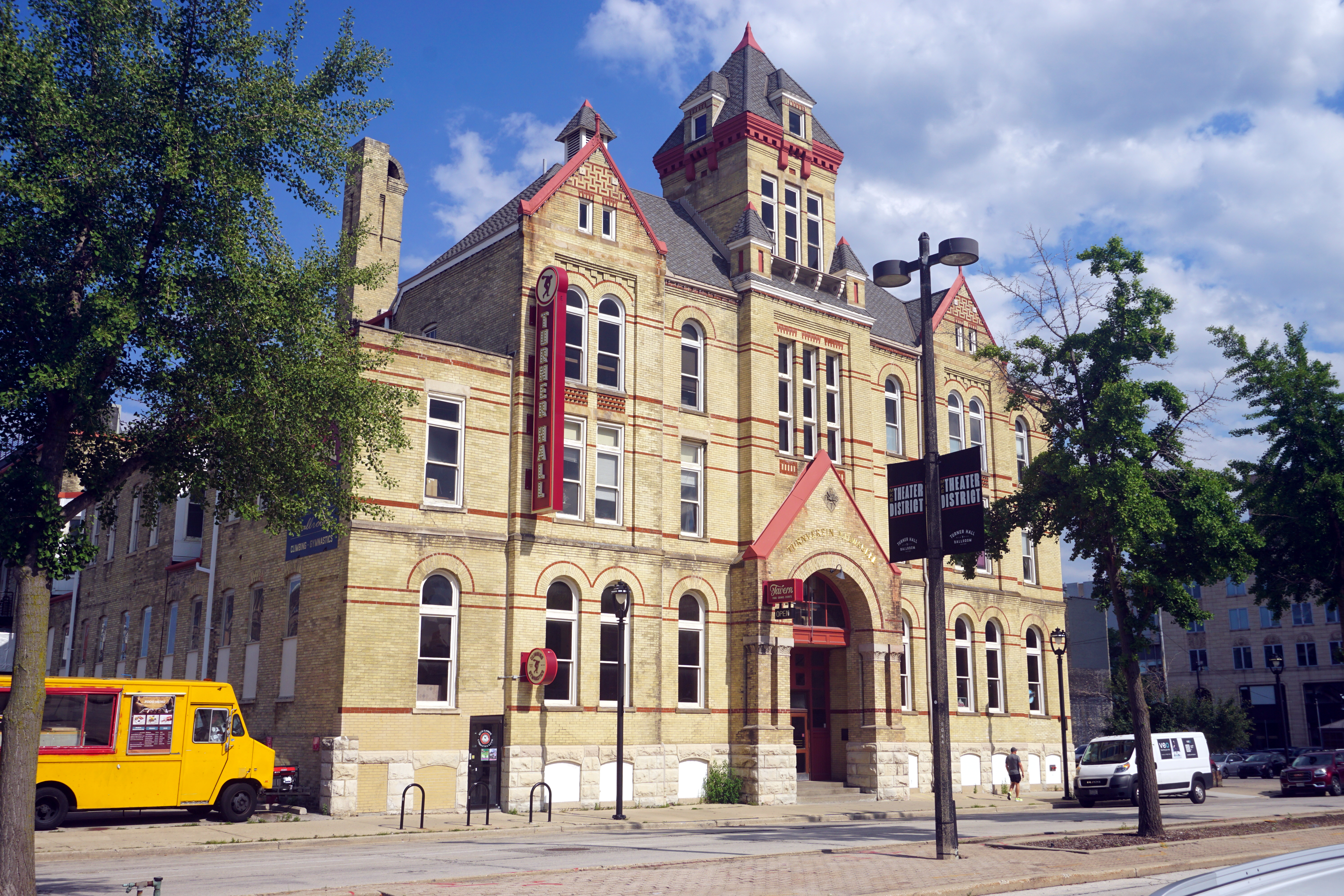
Turner Hall in downtown Milwaukee
