= Fulton Base Ball Club =

Pre-Negro League baseball team from Charleston, South Carolina

The Fulton Base Ball Club was a pre-Negro league baseball team that played out of Charleston, South Carolina. The team was formed in the mid 1870s and operated in some form through the 1880s. In 1886 it became a member of the Southern League of Colored Base Ballists, the first African American baseball league. The team, suffering from financial difficulties, dropped out of the league in early July.

== History ==
The Fulton Base Ball Club was a black baseball team founded in Charleston, South Carolina in the mid 1870s.

In 1886 the team joined the first professional black baseball league, the Southern League of Colored Base Ballists.

On June 18, the team played its first league game against the Georgia Champions of Atlanta. The Fultons lost the game 8–4. The game was described as an improvement for the club who had fared poorly in earlier exhibition games. The team was scheduled to continue the homestand against the Champions on June 19, 20, and 21.

On July 4, just prior to the Fulton’s first road trip, several prominent owners of the team failed to provide the sufficient funds for the team to travel to Atlanta to play the Champions. The team was reportedly in third place in the league standings. After July 4, the team did not compete in any more league games. The Southern League of Colored Base Ballists appears to have also collapsed in early August.

The team continued to play regional games. In August 1886, they played a team from Boston in the town of Camden, South Carolina.

== Roster ==
The team roster in 1886.

- T. L. Grant - Chairman
- J. J. Young - Manager
- L. R. Clark - Secretary
- H. E. Myers - Treasurer
- Joseph Dereef - short stop / left field
- Sam Washington - right field / center field
- Steve Jones - short stop
- Edward Ryan - right field
- W. White - first base
- Geo. Washington - center field / right field
- James Smith - center field / catcher
- Smith - second base
- Smalls - second base
- William Brown - catcher
- James Williams - catcher
- Holmes - third base
- Primus P. Dennis - third base / pitcher
- Campbell - pitcher
- James Roberts - second base
- B. B. H. Smith - pitcher / left field
- Nathan H. Williams - left field / short stop / catcher / Captain
- James Coles - sub
