= Old Mackinac Point Light =

Lighthouse in Michigan, United States

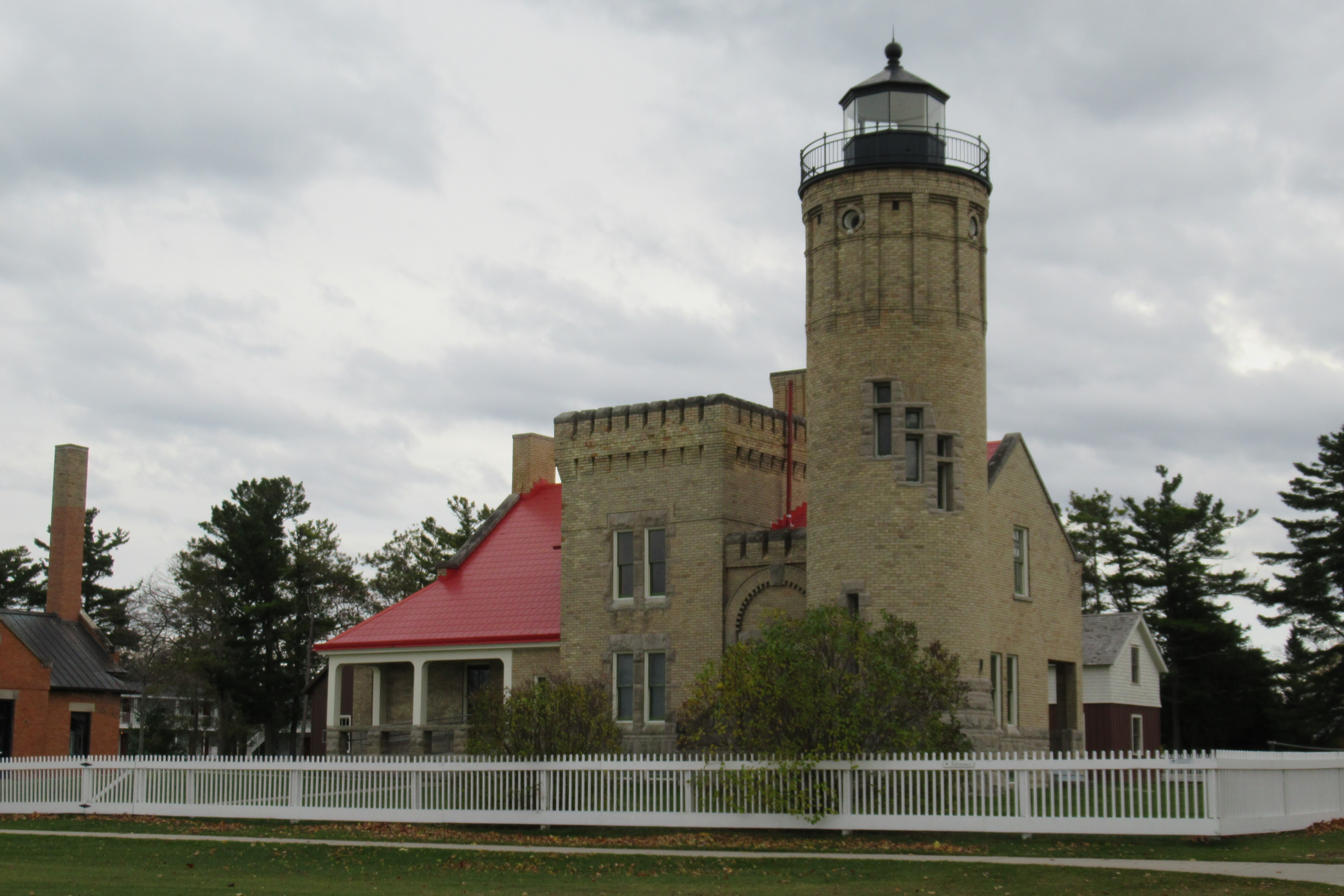
- Old Mackinac Point Light in November 2022
- Location: Mackinaw City, Michigan
- Coordinates: 45°47′15″N 84°43′46″W

Tower
- Constructed: 1892
- Foundation: Ashlar limestone
- Construction: Cream City brick
- Height: 50 feet (15 m)
- Shape: Cylindrical "castle" with attached dwelling
- Markings: Natural with black lantern
- Heritage: National Register of Historic Places listed place

Light
- First lit: 1892
- Deactivated: 1957
- Focal height: 62 feet (19 m)
- Lens: Fourth order Fresnel lens
- Range: 14 nautical miles; 26 kilometres (16 mi)
- Mackinac Point Lighthouse
- U.S. National Register of Historic Places
- Michigan State Historic Site
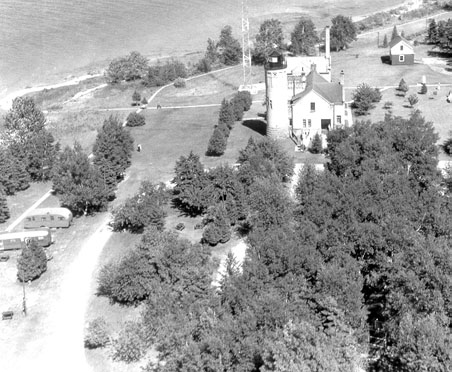
- U.S. Coast Guard vintage photo
- Location: Michilimackinac State Park, Mackinaw City, Michigan
- Area: 0.9 acres (0.36 ha)
- NRHP reference No.: 69000068

Significant dates
- Added to NRHP: October 1, 1969
- Designated MSHS: April 14, 1972

Old Mackinac Point Light is a deactivated lighthouse located at the northern tip of the Lower Peninsula in the U.S. state of Michigan. The lighthouse is part of Fort Michilimackinac State Park in the village of Mackinaw City just east of the Mackinac Bridge.

The lighthouse was constructed in 1892 along the Straits of Mackinac at the junction of Lake Michigan and Lake Huron. It was deactivated in 1957 and currently serves as a museum.

== History ==
=== Preparations ===
Even before the advent of European explorers, the Straits of Mackinac were a significant hazard to water borne travelers. Consequently, before lighthouses, the Ojibwa lit the shore with fires.

In the early 19th century, with large vessel traffic increasing from Lake Huron into the Straits, the first step in guarding the Straits was taken in 1829, through the construction of Bois Blanc Lighthouse to both guide mariners in making the westerly turn into the Straits, and to warn them of the shoals and shallows surrounding the island.

Three years later in 1832, Congress acted on Stephen Pleasonton’s recommendation that a lightship be placed on Waugoshance Shoal as the first attempt to mark the western entrance to the Straits. In 1838, Lieutenant James T. Homans reported that the lightship was wholly inadequate. He recommended a better solution for Waugoshance and also that a light be built on the point to the west of Mackinaw Harbor. Nothing came of Homans' recommendations. In 1854, the new Lighthouse Administration decided (against the recommendation of local residents) to put a light at McGulpin Point, approximately 3 miles (4.8 km) to the west of Old Point Mackinaw.

=== Construction ===
In 1889, the United States Lighthouse Board realized that Mackinaw Point was a better location. Their first inclination was to put a fog signal there, but when asking Congress for funding, they requested funding for both a fog signal and a first class lighthouse. Congress chose to accept their recommendation, but only voted the funding for a steam-powered fog-signal. The fog signal was built in 1890. The signal proved to be exceptionally necessary for navigation in the often fog-choked Straits of Mackinac; during one exceptionally humid fortnight, the Old Mackinac Point signal personnel reported burning 52 cords of stove wood in order to keep steam up for the foghorn.

The lighthouse "grew out of the fog station." In March 1891, Congress finally authorized the funding for a light station and the board acted quickly. Bidding was difficult, but in 1892, "on a foundation of ashlar limestone, the tower and attached keeper’s dwelling were both constructed of Cream City brick, trimmed with Indiana Limestone, by general contractor John Peter Schmitt of Detroit. The double-walled cylindrical tower was laid with an outside diameter of 13 feet 4 inches (4.06 m), and as each course was added, rose to a height of 45 feet (14 m), surmounted by a circular iron gallery and an 8-foot-8-inch (2.64 m) diameter watch room, which was in turn capped by a prefabricated octagonal iron lantern." The lens is a fourth order Fresnel Lens.

Its light was visible for 14 nautical miles; 26 kilometres (16 mi), which made it "particularly valuable" to the railroad car ferries SS Chief Wawatam and SS Sainte Marie operated between Mackinaw City and St. Ignace.

=== Deactivation and preservation ===
The completion of the Mackinac Bridge in 1957 eliminated the need for the light. Since the Mackinac Bridge has lights on it at night, the bridge became a much better aid to navigation than the light.

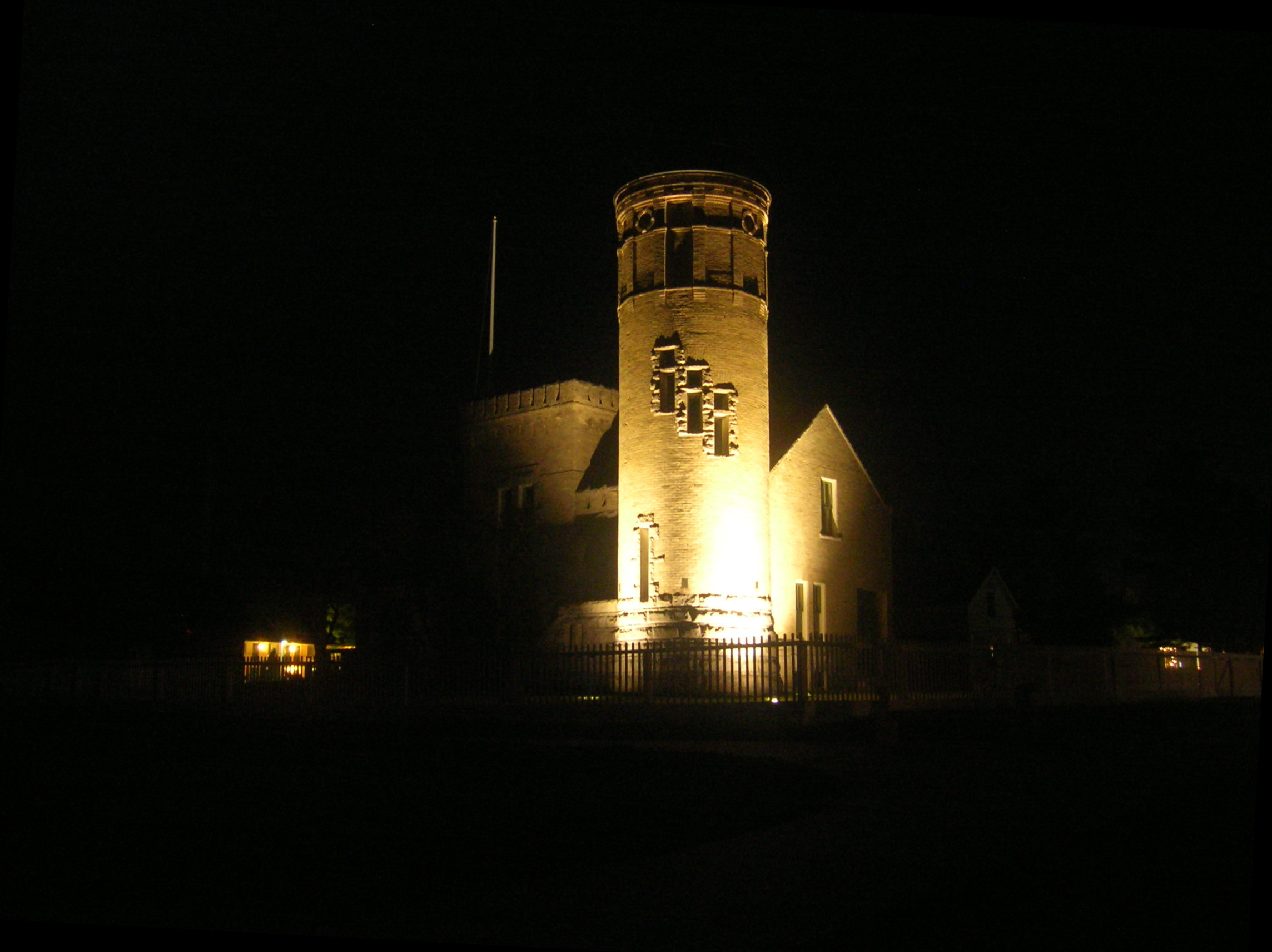
The light as seen at night

In 1960, the lighthouse property was purchased by the Mackinac Island State Park Commission, incorporating it into surrounding Fort Michilimackinac State Park. The Old Mackinac Point Lighthouse was added to the National Register of Historic Places in November 1969, as Reference #69000068 (listed as: Mackinac Point Lighthouse).

It is also a registered Michigan Historic Landmark. The Michigan Historical Marker on site, erected in 1977 as Registered Site S-0377, states:

"Mackinac Point Light. This lighthouse is opposite the turning point for ships making the difficult passage through the Straits of Mackinac, one of the busiest crossroads of the Great Lakes. McGulpin Point Light, two miles to the west, had been established in 1856, but it was not visible from all directions. In 1889 Congress appropriated funds for the construction of a steam-powered fog signal here, which went into operation on November 5, 1890. Construction of the light tower and attached lightkeepers' dwelling began, and the light was first displayed on October 25, 1892. Heavy iron and brass castings were used throughout the structure, and the light was visible to ships sixteen miles away. In operation until 1958, the lighthouse is now a maritime museum."

In 2000, serious restoration was undertaken, with the intent of restoring it to its appearance around 1910. The lighthouse complex, including the lightkeeper's quarters and tower, was reopened to the public in 2004 by Mackinac State Historic Parks as part of the Fort Michilimackinac complex. The light's original Fresnel lens is on display. In addition, starting in 2018, major exterior and interior masonry restoration was undertaken by National Restoration Inc. The castle-style structure, which design is unique in the Great Lakes was restored.

As a result of these restorations, the first floor is fully accessible, and includes period furnishings and accoutrement, plus hands-on exhibits that test one's nighttime navigation skills, light a miniature Fresnel lens, and put on Lighthouse keeper clothing. Historic interpreters lead tours up the tower and into the lantern room. An admission fee is charged.

== Current status and getting there ==
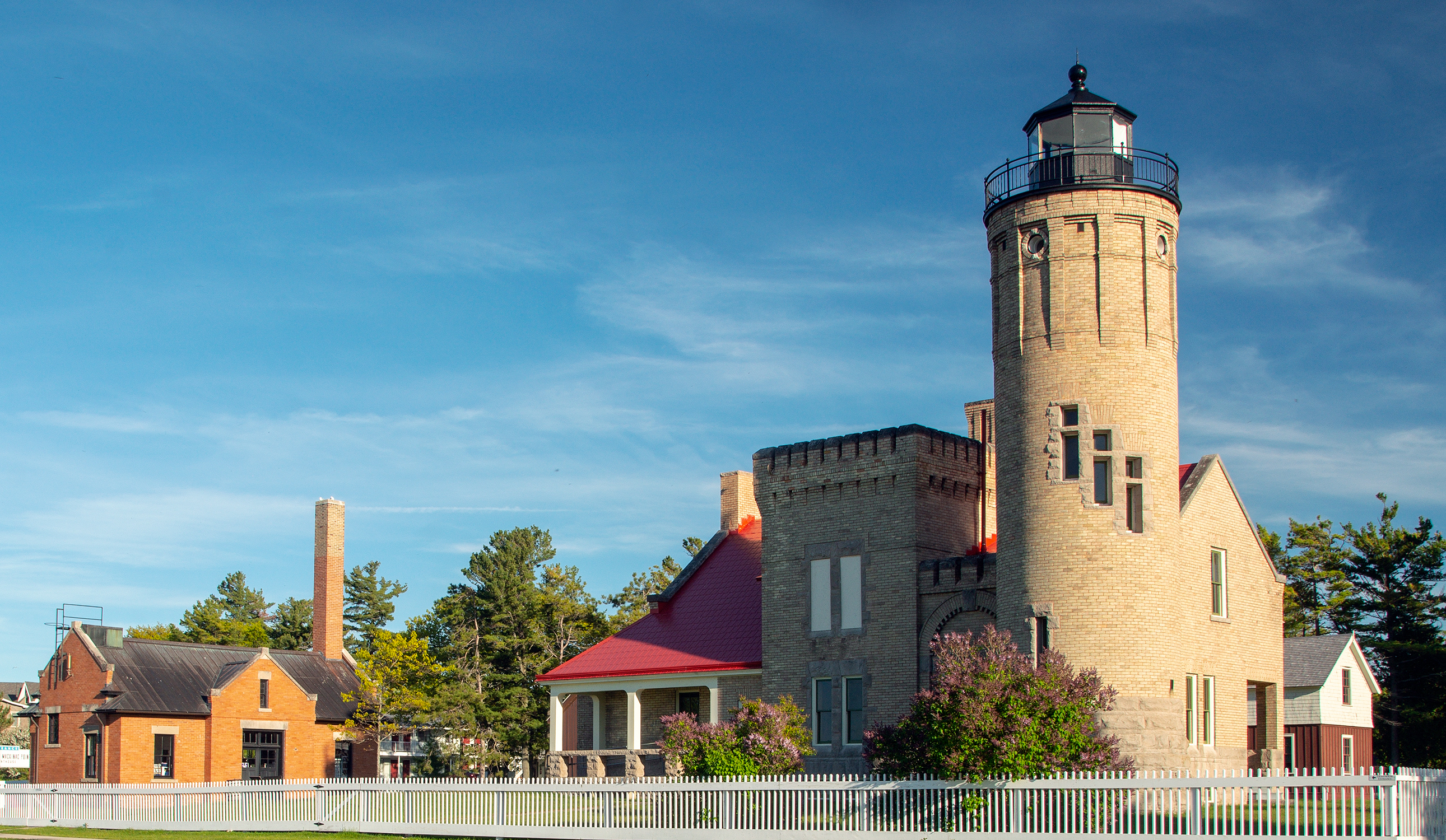
Old Mackinac Point Lighthouse, June 2019

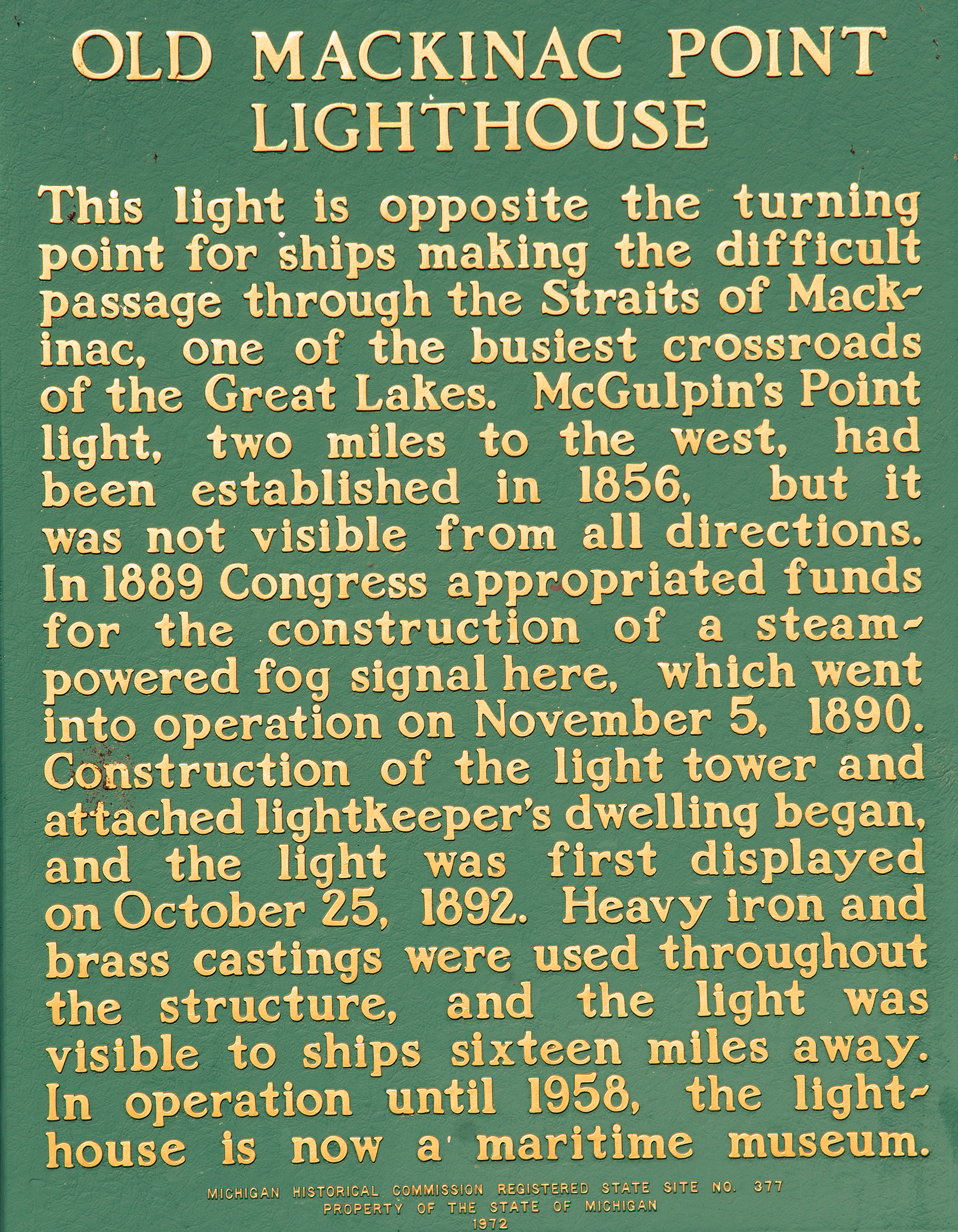
Sign summarizing the history of the lighthouse

Adjacent to the Mackinac Bridge, the park offers a good view of the bridge and boat traffic.

Admission is through the 1907 Fog Signal Building, which houses the museum store. An admission fee is charged. Pets are welcome.

The tower is open to the public.

The lighthouse is located within Michilimackinac State Park, just a few hundred feet east of the Mackinac Bridge and the Colonial Michilimackinac Visitors Center. At this time the light is a museum run by Mackinac Parks Commission.

Because of its prime location and exposure to tourists, plus its unique picturesque form and color, it is the subject of photographs, drawings, and needlepoint illustrations. Historical photographs are a prominent feature of the Mackinac Island State Park Commission website.

An alternative is to charter a seaplane for a tour of the Mackinac Straits and surrounding areas.

== See also ==
- Great Lakes Storm of 1913
- Shipwrecks of the 1913 Great Lakes storm
- List of victims of the 1913 Great Lakes storm
- Lighthouses in the United States
