= Eagle Bluff Light =

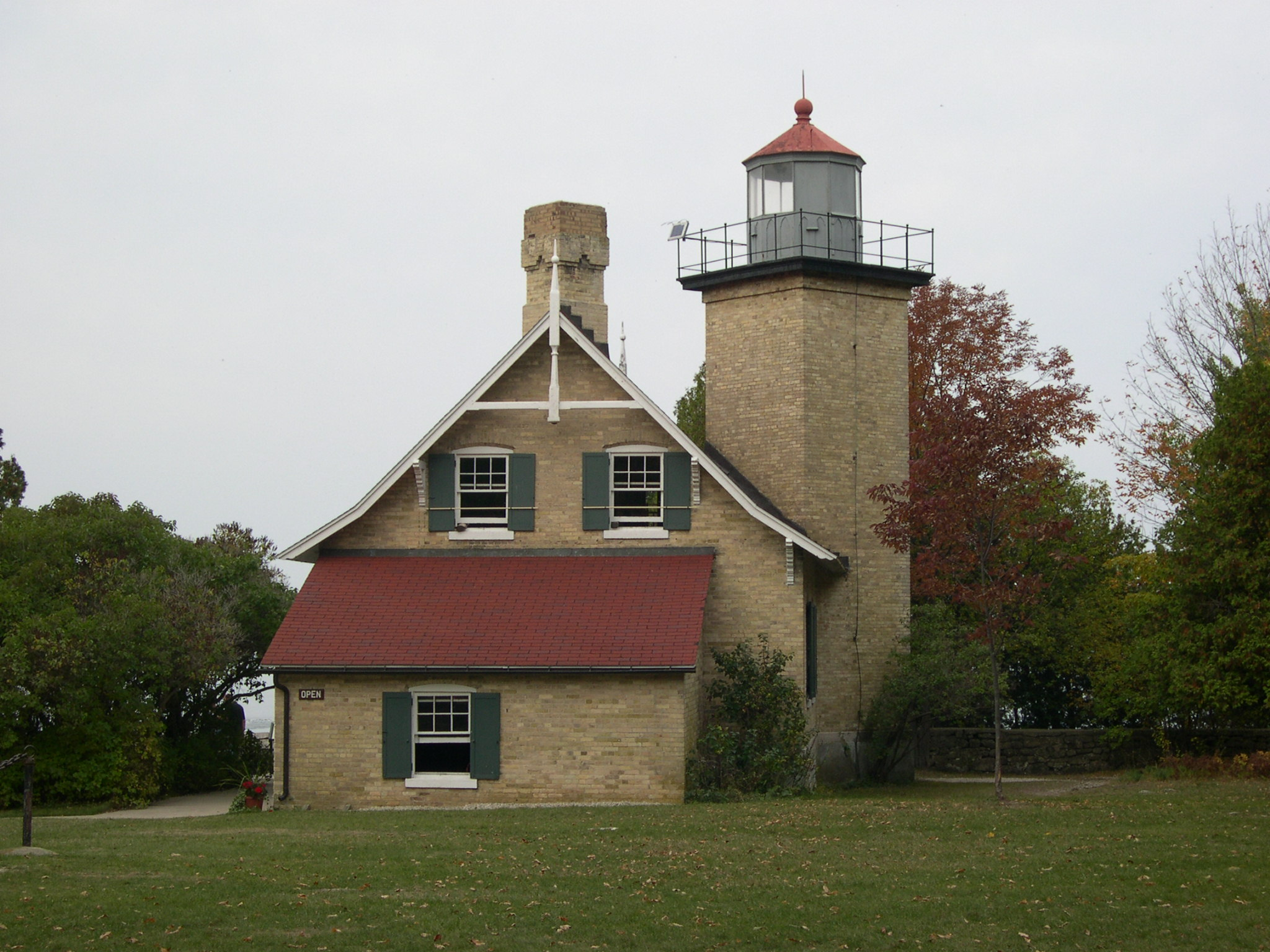
- Location: Ephraim, Wisconsin, US
- Coordinates: 45°10′07.3″N 87°14′11.98″W

Tower
- Constructed: 1868
- Foundation: Concrete
- Construction: Cream City brick
- Automated: 1926
- Height: 43 feet (13 m)
- Shape: Square
- Heritage: National Register of Historic Places listed place

Light
- First lit: 1868
- Focal height: 23 m (75 ft)
- Lens: Third and 1/2 order Fresnel lens
- Range: 7 nautical miles (13 km; 8.1 mi)
- Characteristic: White, Flashing every 6 sec
- Eagle Bluff Lighthouse
- U.S. National Register of Historic Places
- Area: 4 acres (1.6 ha)
- Built: 1868
- NRHP reference No.: 70000032
- Added to NRHP: October 15, 1970

The Eagle Bluff Light, also known as Eagle Bluff lighthouse, is a lighthouse located near Ephraim in Peninsula State Park in Door County, Wisconsin, United States. Construction was authorized in 1866, and the lighthouse was built in 1868 at a cost of $12,000. It was automated in 1926. Restoration work began on the Eagle Bluff Light in 1960 and was completed in 1963; upon completion the lighthouse was opened for tours. The lighthouse was added to the National Register of Historic Places in 1970.

== Geography ==
The lighthouse is located in Peninsula State Park, situated on a 33-foot bluff that overlooks the Strawberry Channel. Eagle Bluff's mission is to illuminate the islands located in the middle of the strawberry channel. This mission is what gives Eagle Bluff its nickname "The Guardian of the Strawberry Channel".

Much of Door County is located on the Niagara Escarpment. The escarpment makes it very hard to dig into the soil of Door County and for this reason it is very unusual to have a basement in Door County. Eagle Bluff has two basements. One under the tower and one under the keeper's residence.

== Door County Historical Society ==
The Door County Historical Society (DCHS) has managed and preserved Eagle Bluff Light Station since 1960, when it was granted permission to restore the long-neglected lighthouse and open it to the public. After a restoration completed in 1964, the site became a popular Door County attraction. In recent years, DCHS restored the lighthouse, oil house, and privy while reconstructing the historic barn and summer kitchen to return the property to its appearance during the Duclon family's residency (1883–1918). Today, the Society operates Eagle Bluff Light Station as a museum, offering tours through the keeper's residence, light tower, barn visitor center, summer kitchen, and other historic buildings, allowing visitors to experience the daily life of a 19th-century lighthouse keeper.

== Keepers ==
There were three keepers who maintained the Eagle Bluff Light: Henry Stanley, William Duclon, and Peter Coughlin.

=== William Duclon (1883–1918) ===
The longest serving keeper in Eagle Bluff's history, William Duclon and his wife Julia Duclon (née Davenport) raised their seven sons in this lighthouse. Eagle Bluff has been restored to the time period of the Duclons, some of their original possessions can be seen on display in the home today.

The youngest son of William and Julia, Walter Duclon, helped with the restorations of Eagle Bluff. He provided personal stories, artifacts, and family documents to help aid in the creation of the museum that is now housed in the keeper's residence.

== Gallery ==
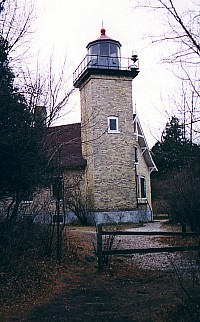
Eagle Bluff Light

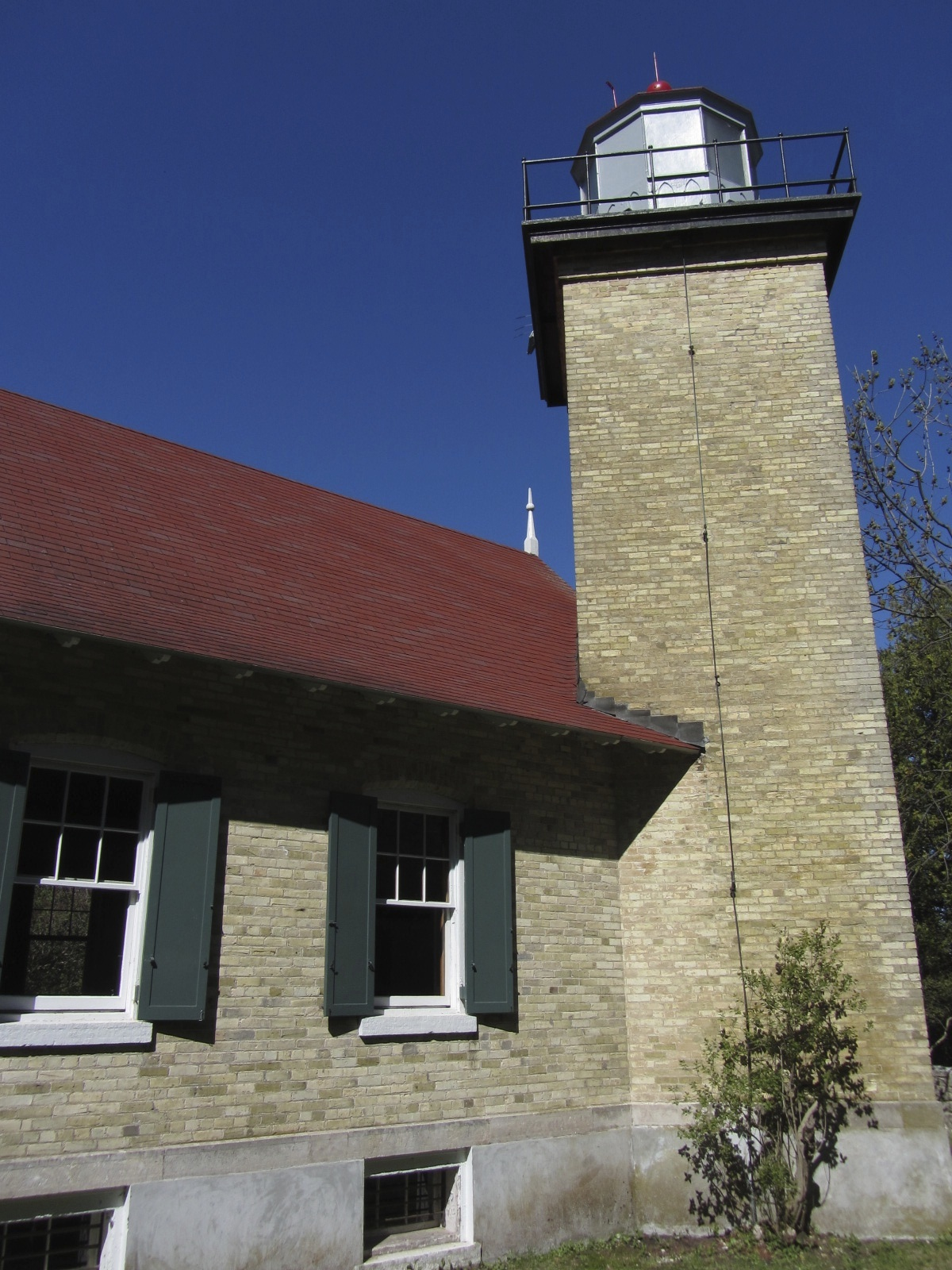
Other side of the tower

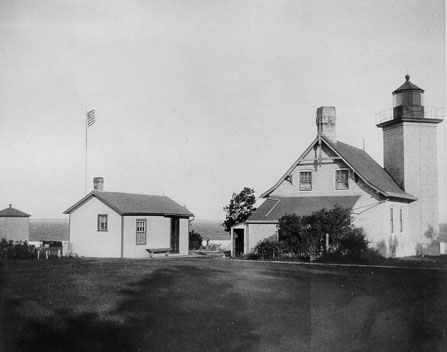
USCG archive photo

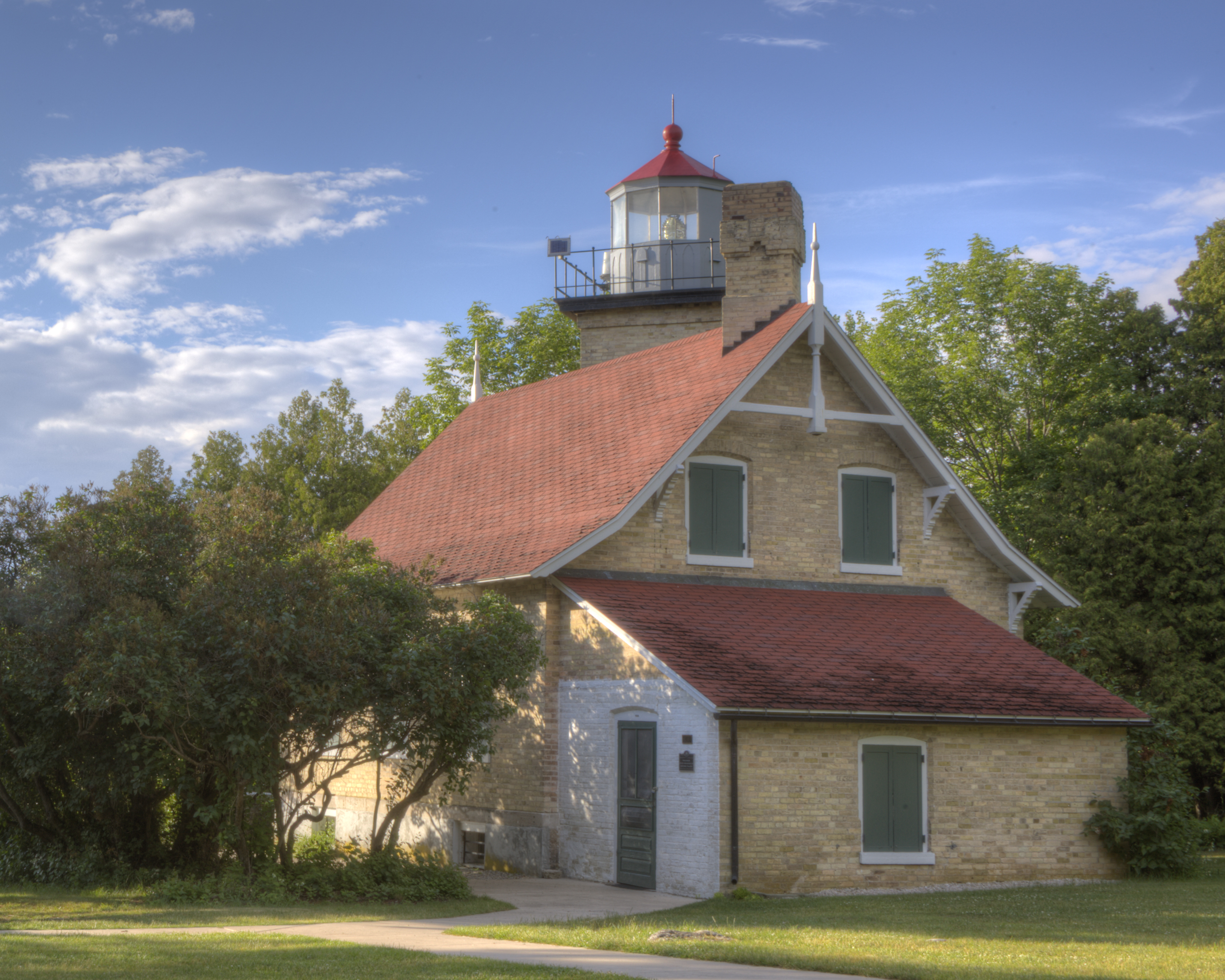
Eagle Bluff Lighthouse

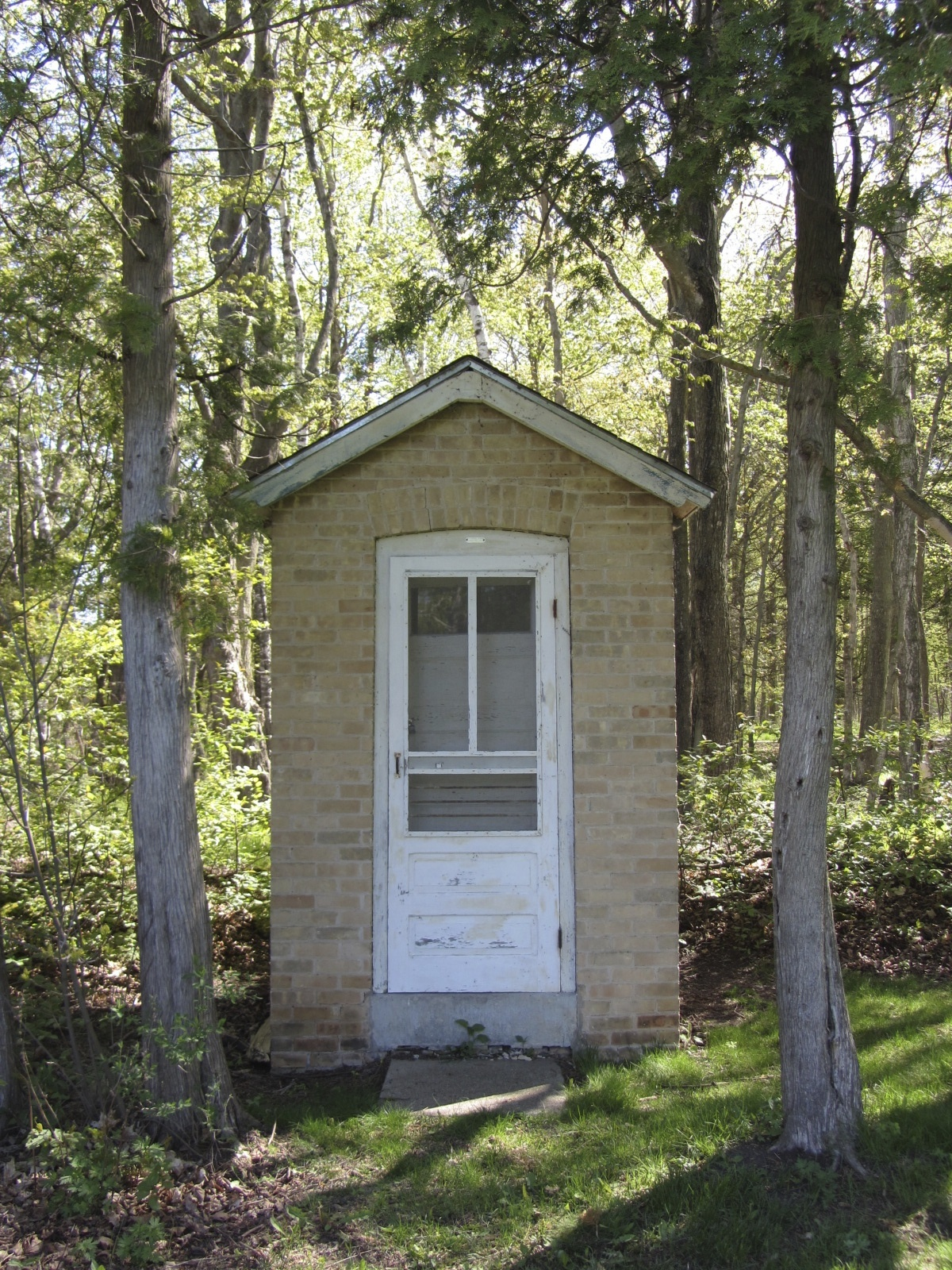
Outhouse for the keeper

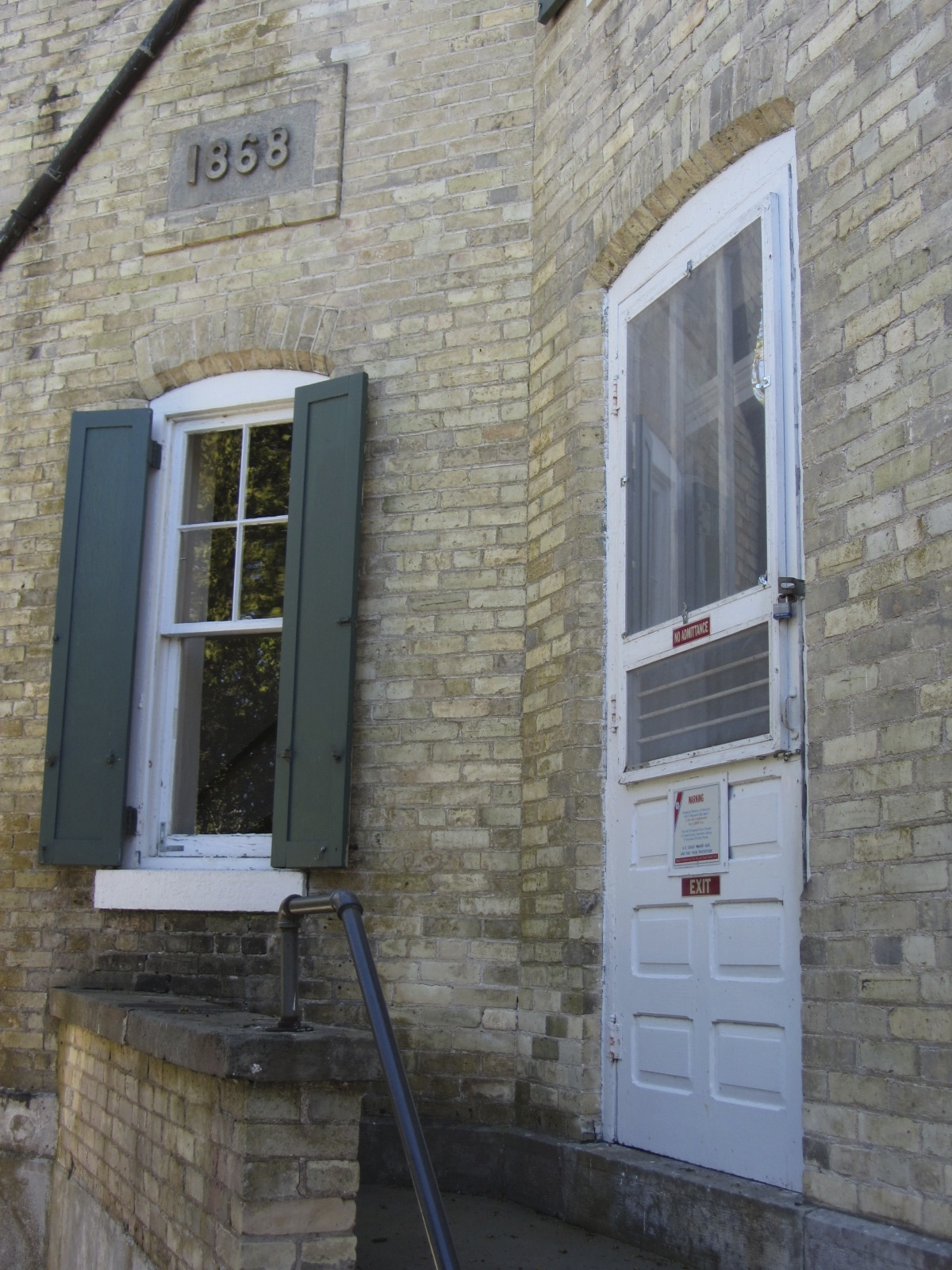
1868 cornerstone

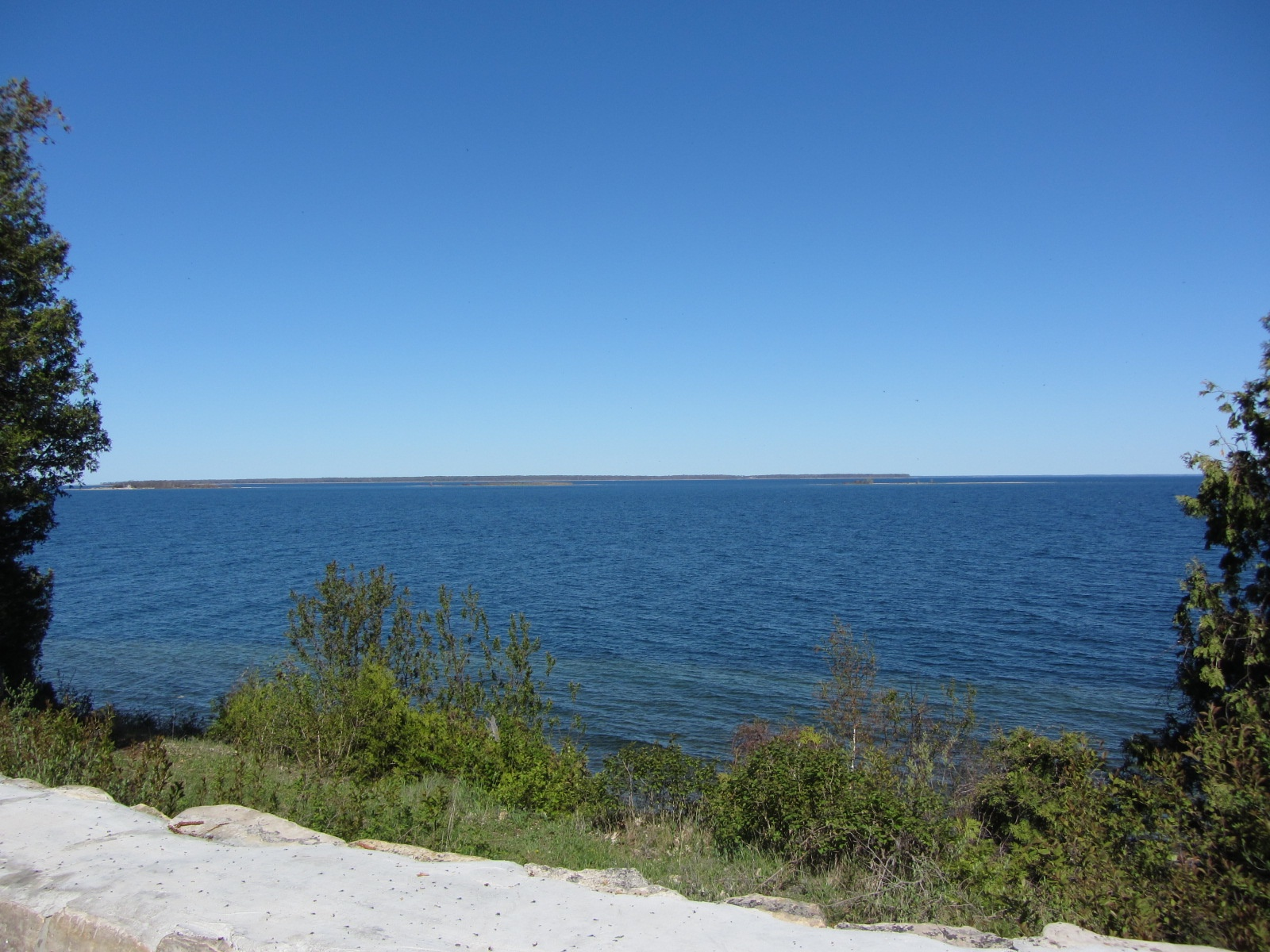
View of the Strawberry Islands from the lighthouse
