= Milwaukee Cream Citys =

American minor league baseball team

The Cream City Club of Milwaukee, Wisconsin, was a baseball team in the 1860s, usually known as the Cream Citys.

== History ==
The Cream City Base Ball Club was organized in August 1865, with Henry H. West as its first president, and rose to the upper echelon of Midwestern amateur teams. At first they played at the old Fair Grounds field on Spring Street (now Wisconsin Avenue), which had been the site of Camp Scott during the Civil War. After two years they moved closer to the lakefront, playing at the Prospect Avenue field (formerly Camp Reno).

By February, 1868, the Grain Exchange proudly displayed the Milwaukee club's trophies and awards from 1866 and 1867. This success came at the expense of other Wisconsin clubs and its tournaments at Chicago and Rockford, Illinois. Madison, Janesville, and Beloit could put up their best, but it was to no avail. The Milwaukees would lose only one game in intrastate play during that period.

Contrary to their success against amateur teams, the Cream Citys were clobbered 67–13 on June 22, 1868, when they hosted the Brooklyn Atlantics—"a mostly pro contingent that had dominated the sport throughout most of the 1860s." On August 7, they lost by a slightly more respectable 43–16 to the visiting Union of Morrisania, another powerhouse featuring left-handed pitcher Charlie Pabor, right fielder Steve Bellán, and shortstop George Wright. At that time the Cream City lineup included J.H. Wood, first base; Archie MacFayden, shortstop; George L. Redlington, catcher and captain; Martin Larkin, Jr, center field; W.H. Dodsworth, right field; Clarence Smith, pitcher; E.C. Wells, left field; and Charles S. Norris, second base. (Note: No third baseman is listed (evidently by Podoll). According to Wright, those eight surnames less Dodsworth (seven men) played all five games on record, along with multiple teammates whom he does not list.)

For that 1868 season, the Cream Citys had joined the National Association of Base Ball Players (NABBP), which embraced hundreds of clubs by that time. Despite its desire to play against the best teams, Cream City remained proudly amateur when the NABBP first permitted openly professional clubs for 1869. That did not conflict with playing the best teams occasionally. On the contrary, building adequate grounds and fielding a competent amateur team were the ways that the "baseball fraternity" in a city ensured experiencing some top-quality baseball. On July 26, they lost to the undefeated, all-professional Cincinnati Red Stockings by the lopsided score of 85–7.

Chicago and Rockford, Illinois, fielded professional teams in 1870, which both visited Milwaukee and won easily. So did the Harvard college team, evidently the strongest in the amateur field that summer (47–13 on July 27). The creation of a professional league in 1871, the National Association of Professional Base Ball Players (NAPBBP), further sidelined the club, which finally dissolved in 1876.

In 1877, the League Alliance—the first semi-affiliated minor league baseball league—included a Cream Citys team, which played to a record of 19–13 (.594), finishing in fourth among the 13 teams in the league.

== See also ==
- History of professional baseball in Milwaukee
