= League Alliance =

Former American professional baseball league

The League Alliance was the first semi-affiliated minor league baseball league. Proposed by Al Spalding on January 15, 1877, independent baseball teams were to affiliate with National League teams, which would honor their respective contracts. The league only existed for one season, 1877, though another version was attempted in 1882.

== Teams ==
- Alaskas
- Albany M. N. Nolan
- Auburn Auburnians
- Binghamton Cricket
- Brooklyn Chelsea
- Buffalo Bisons
- Chicago Fairbanks
- Elizabeth Resolute
- Erie
- Evansville Red
- Fall River Cascades
- Hornellsville Hornells
- Indianapolis Blues
- Janesville Mutual
- Livingston
- Lowell Ladies' Men
- Ludlow
- Memphis Reds
- Milwaukee Cream Citys
- Minneapolis Browns
- Philadelphia Athletic
- Philadelphia Defiance
- Springfield Champion City
- St. Paul Red Caps
- Syracuse Star
- Troy Haymakers
- Wheeling Standard
- Winona Clippers

== See also ==
- 1877 in baseball
- Northwestern League, considered the first baseball minor league
