= Southern League of Colored Base Ballists =

- Sport: Baseball
- Founded: 1886
- Folded: 1886
- President: John W. Jones
- No. of teams: 10
- Country: United States

The Southern League of Colored Base Ballists was the first organized Negro baseball league. The league's only year of operation was 1886. Ten teams competed in the league which stretched from Jacksonville, Florida to Memphis, Tennessee with several other southern teams mentioned as possible members in newspaper articles from the period. The league appears to have collapsed in early July.

== History ==
The first mention of the league was in March 1886 when the following ad ran in several major Southern newspapers: “A call has been issued for the captains of all colored base ball clubs of Georgia, Florida, South Carolina, Alabama, and Tennessee that have a fair record and desire to enter the Southern League of Colored Base Ballists to send name and address to The Manager of the Southern League of Coloered Base Ballists, Lock Box 298, Jacksonville, Florida.” T.T. Harden was the manager of the league, which had a board of twelve directors. An informational circular obtained by The News and Courier said that the board of directors represented “… a capital of nearly $100,000.” Clubs that wanted to join the league were required to submit a five dollar fee to cover the cost of advertising, postage, and telegraph cost. They were also required to pay $1.50 for a subscription to The Southern Leader, a black newspaper based in Jacksonville, Florida. The Southern Leader was to be “the official organ of the league”.

The league convention was held on May 22 attended by twenty-two delegates in Jacksonville. During the meeting T. T. Hardin read a prepared report about the league and made recommendations that were adopted by the delegates. It was also decided at the convention that a series of exhibition games would be held May 24 in St. Augustine, Florida. The games would feature the Daisy Cutters, Clippers, Macedonians, Tallapoosas, and Greenleafs. The delegates left the meeting announcing the league's opening day would be June 7 in Atlanta, Georgia and would feature the Georgia Champions and the Memphis Eclipse. The schedules were left to the team directors and managers to workout by June 1. Although no comprehensive schedule is currently known to exist some local newspapers did publish their teams schedules in early June. The Charleston News and Courier published the Fulton's schedule on June 6 and the Times-Picayune published the New Orleans Unions on June 7.

The first game of the Southern League of Colored Base Ballists was played on June 7, 1886, between the Champions and the Eclipse in Atlanta, Georgia. The Champions won the game 11–10. Pointer pitched and Wood caught for Memphis.

One of the best documented games of the season was in New Orleans on June 16, 1886. The Unions of New Orleans played the Memphis Eclipse. Memphis won the game 3–1. The New Orleans Times-Picayune newspaper reported that after watching the game, “…colored clubs will furnish good sport, and the teams can play ball… The Eclipse boys all field well and threw the ball like the best professionals.” Approximately 500 people attended the game. The winning pitcher for Memphis was William Renfroe.

In August the Memphis Appeal newspaper reported that the Eurekas and the Eclipse ball clubs of Memphis were “champion colored clubs.” There is no evidence though that the league lasted long enough to declare a champion.

== League officials ==
The following were the officials that ran the league.

- President – John Jones
- Manager – Thomas T. Harden
- Treasurer – L. H. Jones
- Secretary – M. J. Christopher

== Notable players ==
- William Renfroe, a pitcher for the Memphis Eclipses, would pitch for the Binghamton Bingos of the International League in 1887. After being released by the Bingos he returned to Memphis and managed the Eclipses. Later Renfroe would pitch for several different black baseball teams in the Chicago area.
- Robert "Bob" Higgins was a pitcher for the Memphis Eurekas. Higgins would pitch for the Syracuse Stars of the International League in 1887 and 1888. His record in 1887 was 20 wins and 7 losses with a batting average of .294 in 41 games. In 1888 Higgins and teammate Moses Fleetwood Walker were the Star's all black battery.

== Teams ==
The following teams were listed as having members at the May 22 league convention with the exception of the Fultons.

- Daisy Cutter Baseball Club - Fernandina, FL
- Athletic Baseball Club - Jacksonville, FL
- Roman Cities Baseball Club - LaVilla, FL
- Clipper Baseball Club - Jacksonville, FL
- Macedonia Baseball Club - Jacksonville, FL
- Eclipse Baseball Club - Memphis, TN
- Eureka Baseball Club - Memphis, TN
- Garden Lilies Baseball Club - Palatka, FL
- Tallapoosa Baseball Club - St. Augustine, FL
- Lafayette Baseball Club - Savannah, GA
- Boardways (or Boards) Baseball Club - Savannah, GA
- Fox Hunter Baseball Club - Macon, GA
- The Georgia Champions’ Baseball Club - Atlanta, GA
- Union Baseball Club - New Orleans, LA
- Callathumpians Baseball Club - Tallahassee, FL
- Chattanooga Baseball Club - Chattanooga, TN
- Montgomery Baseball Club - Montgomery, AL
- Pensacola Baseball Club - Pensacola, FL
- Fultons Baseball Club - Charleston, SC
