= Memphis Eclipses =

Information
- League: Southern League of Colored Base Ballists
- Location: Memphis, Tennessee
- Established: 1886

The Memphis Eclipses were a Negro league baseball team that played in the Southern League of Colored Base Ballists in 1886. They were located in Memphis, Tennessee, and, along with the Memphis Eurekas, were one of two Memphis teams in the league.
