= Memphis Reds (League Alliance) =

- 1877; Memphis, Tennessee

Minor league affiliations
- Class: Unclassified
- League: League Alliance

Major league affiliations
- Team: Unaffiliated

Minor league titles
- Pennants (0): None

Team data
- Name: Memphis Reds
- Ballpark: Central Park

The Memphis Reds were a Minor League Baseball team that played in the League Alliance in 1877. They were located in Memphis, Tennessee, and played their home games at Central Park. The Reds accumulated a record of 7–8 (.467) in their only season of competition.

In 1885, the city was represented in the Southern League by a different team also called the Memphis Reds.

== Notable players ==
Six Reds also played in at least one game in Major League Baseball during their careers. They were:

- Doc Kennedy
- Tom Loftus
- Harry Luff
- John Maloney
- Billy Redmond
- John Shoupe
- Oscar Walker
