= Mackinaw City Public Schools =

School district in Michigan, United States

Mackinaw City Public Schools is a public school district headquartered in Mackinaw City, Michigan. The district operates a single K–12 school at 609 West Central Avenue. During the 2024–2025 school year, the district enrolled 147 students and employed 14.33 full-time-equivalent classroom teachers, for a student–teacher ratio of 10.26.

In Cheboygan County it includes that county's portion of Mackinaw City as well as Mackinaw Township and a portion of Hebron Township. In Emmet County the district includes that county's portion of Mackinaw City as well as much of Wawatam Township and portions of Carp Lake Township.

== History ==
In 1966 the district established a memorial loan fund.

In 1968 there was a proposal to merge school districts in the area. According to surveys sent out, the students would, if a merger was required, have preferred to merge with the St. Ignace Area Schools and not any proposals that would require it to merge with any school districts in Emmett County.

In 1996 the Pellston School District okayed a proposal to establish a school choice program with Mackinaw City, where students in one district can attend the other districts' schools. As of July of that year, Mackinaw City had not yet reciprocally approved of the program.

An exterior renovation occurred in 2018.
