= French Farm Lake =

Lake in the state of Michigan, United States

- Location in Michigan
- Location: Emmet County, Michigan
- Coordinates: 45°44′38″N 84°46′08″W
- Type: Lake
- Basin countries: United States
- Surface area: 802 acres (3.25 km^{2})
- Surface elevation: 602 ft (183 m)

French Farm Lake is a lake in Wawatam Township in Emmet County in the U.S. state of Michigan. 802 acres (325 ha) in size, it is located approximately 2.7 miles (4.3 km) southwest of Mackinaw City, Michigan. It is the northernmost lake of Michigan's Lower Peninsula. It is served by the North Country Trail from Mackinaw City and by local dirt roads.

A typical shallow lake in the North Woods, the lake is partly surrounded by wetlands. Like much of the Mackinaw State Forest the region around the lake was cut over in the late 1800s for timber; exhausted land parcels were allowed to return to the public sector. The French Farm Lake State Flooding Wildlife Management Area, a unit within the State Forest that is owned and managed by the Michigan Department of Natural Resources (M-DNR), is a parcel of land of 2,948 acres (1,193 ha) in extent. M-DNR maintains an earthen boat ramp close to the northern end of the lake, from which boaters can launch vessels and fish for bass and pike. The surrounding wetlands are breeding grounds for mallards and wood ducks.

The lake's name may be derived from a frontier farm cultivated on the lakeshore in the 18th century. The farmstead, which supplied food to Fort Michilimackinac, was excavated by archaeologists in 1981-1982. A monograph was published.

== See also ==
- List of lakes in Michigan
