= Arnold Transit Company =

Ferry boat service in Michigan, US

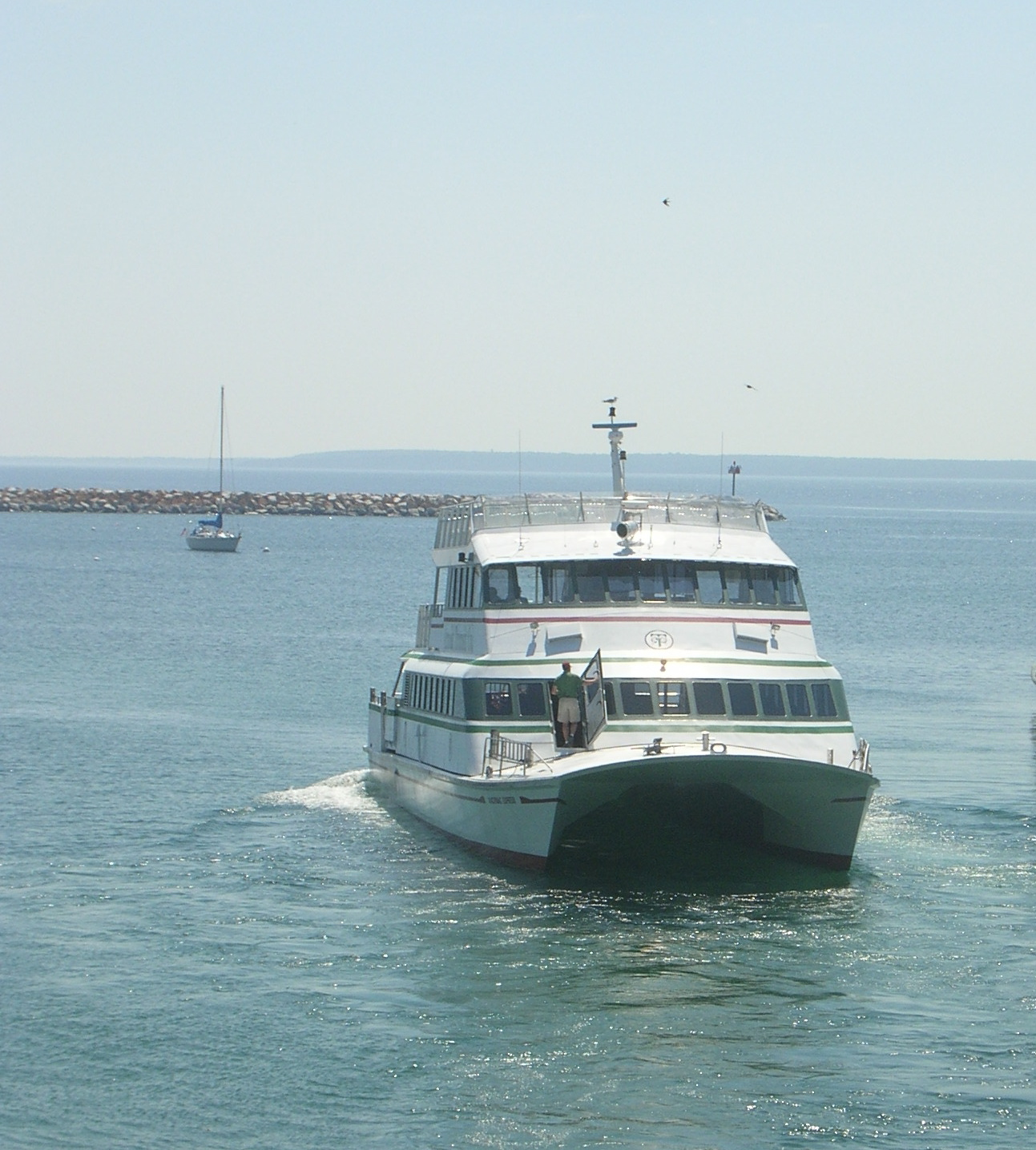
MV Mackinac Express in her Arnold Line livery

Arnold Transit Company is a ferry boat company serving Mackinac Island in Michigan for over 140 years. From 2016 to 2024 Arnold Line's assets including the boats and docks were operated and branded as Star Line Ferry (later Mackinac Island Ferry Company). Since 2024 it has been operated by Hoffman Marine, part of Hoffman Family of Companies.

== History ==
Arnold Transit Company was started in 1878 by George Arnold (1846–1921). Coal-fire steamboats transported passengers and goods for almost 70 years to various Michigan ports and islands. Mrs. Arnold brought in Otto Lang and Prentiss Brown to manage the business.

After World War II, Arnold Transit Company, now owned by Lang and Brown, started to add modern diesel boats to its fleet. In June 1946, Arnold, which ran from Mackinaw City to Mackinac, merged with Island Transportation Company which ran a St. Ignace to Mackinac Island route. In 1984, a long-standing competitor, the Mackinac Transportation Company, ended operations. In 1987, the first of three catamaran ferries was added to the Arnold Line fleet.

In 2010, after decades of ownership, the Brown family announced the sale of Arnold Transit parent company Union Terminal Piers to James Wynn. In 2014, the company suffered financially and the investment group backing Wynn foreclosed. The foreclosure resulted in the public auction of two catamarans. Competitor Star Line Mackinac Island Ferry Service purchased one of the Catamarans, MV Mackinac Express, Pictured Rocks Cruises purchased MV Island Express and was renamed MV PRX, MV Straits Express, is now in New York City being used as a commuter ferry for Hornblower Cruises. Wynn was removed as president and from his position on the board of directors, and operations were taken over by the original investment group out of Cincinnati, Ohio.

In September 2015, an agreement was reached to ensure the company's continued access between its Mackinac Island dock and Main Street, which had been lost in a land deal engineered by Wynn.

In November 2016, competitor Star Line Mackinac Island Ferry announced it would be purchasing the majority of the assets of Arnold Transit Company, including boats, boatyard, its docks and name. The Arnold assets were incorporated into the Star Line fleet for the 2017 season. Star Line renamed itself Mackinac Island Ferry Company in 2022.

In September, 2024, Hoffman Marine, part of Hoffman Family of Companies, acquired Mackinac Island Ferry Company and rebranded as Arnold Transit.

In 2025, Arnold Transit started offering classic ferry rides to Mackinac Island in the summer, using their older ferries.

== Fleet ==
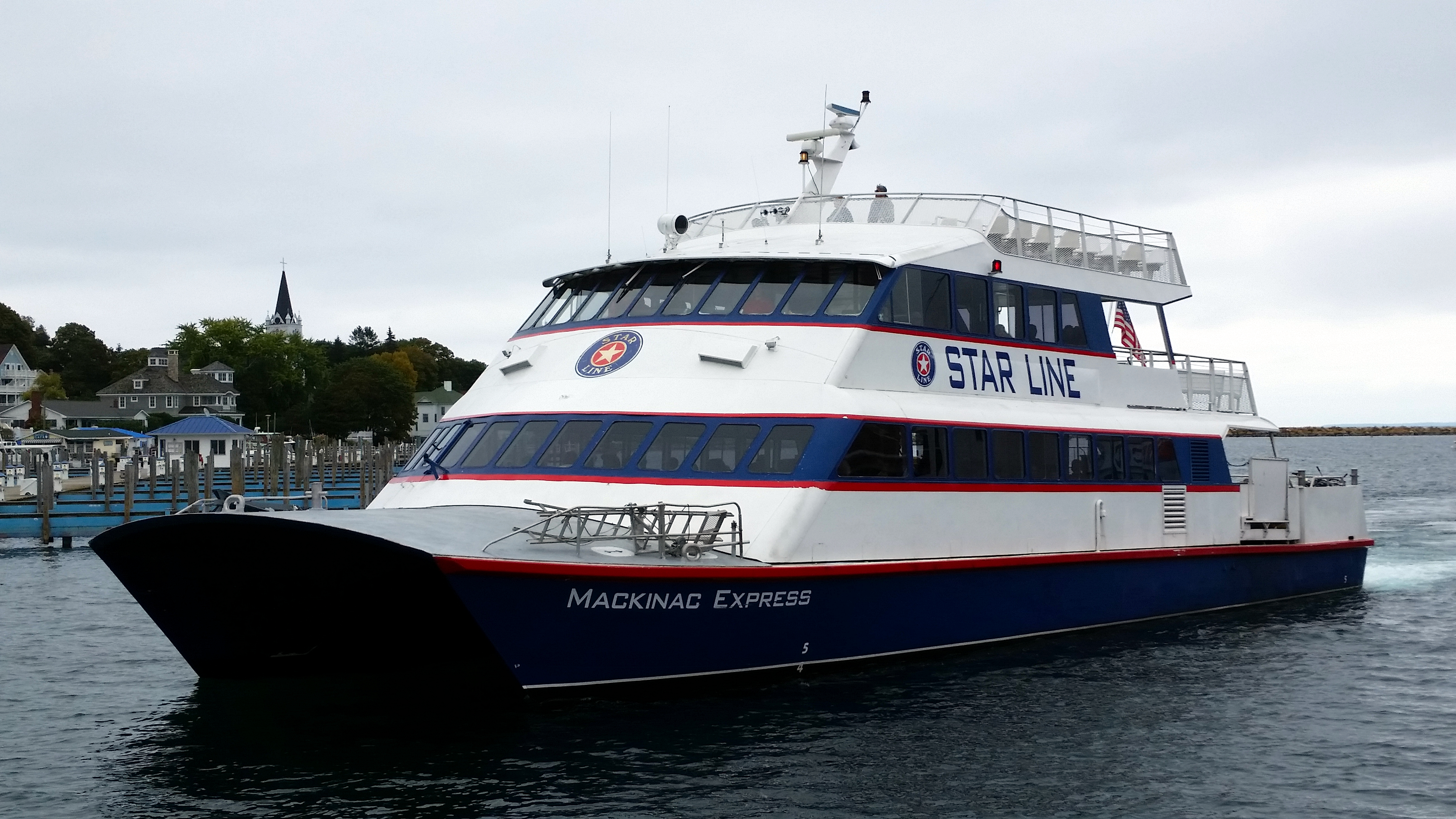
MV Mackinac Express in her Star Line Ferry livery

- Classic Ferries: MV Chippewa, MV Huron, MV Ottawa, MV West Shore (formerly Anna May) and MV Straits of Mackinac II.
- Non-Passenger Freight: MV Corsair, MV The Senator, and MV Mackinac Islander.
- Catamaran: MV Mackinac Express
- Hydro-jet: MV La Salle, MV Radisson, MV Cadillac, MV Joliet, and MV Marquette II.

== Former fleet ==
- MV Island Express (1988-2016) renamed Pictured Rocks Express owned by Pictured Rock Cruises in Munising, Michigan.
- MV Straits Express (1995-2018) owned by Hornblower Cruises in New York City, New York.

== See also ==
- Ferries in Michigan
