= Shepler's Ferry =

Ferry service in Michigan, US

Shepler's Mackinac Island Ferry is one of two ferry companies serving Mackinac Island, Michigan. The company has docks in Mackinaw City and St. Ignace. Shepler's provides passenger ferry service to Mackinac Island.

== History ==
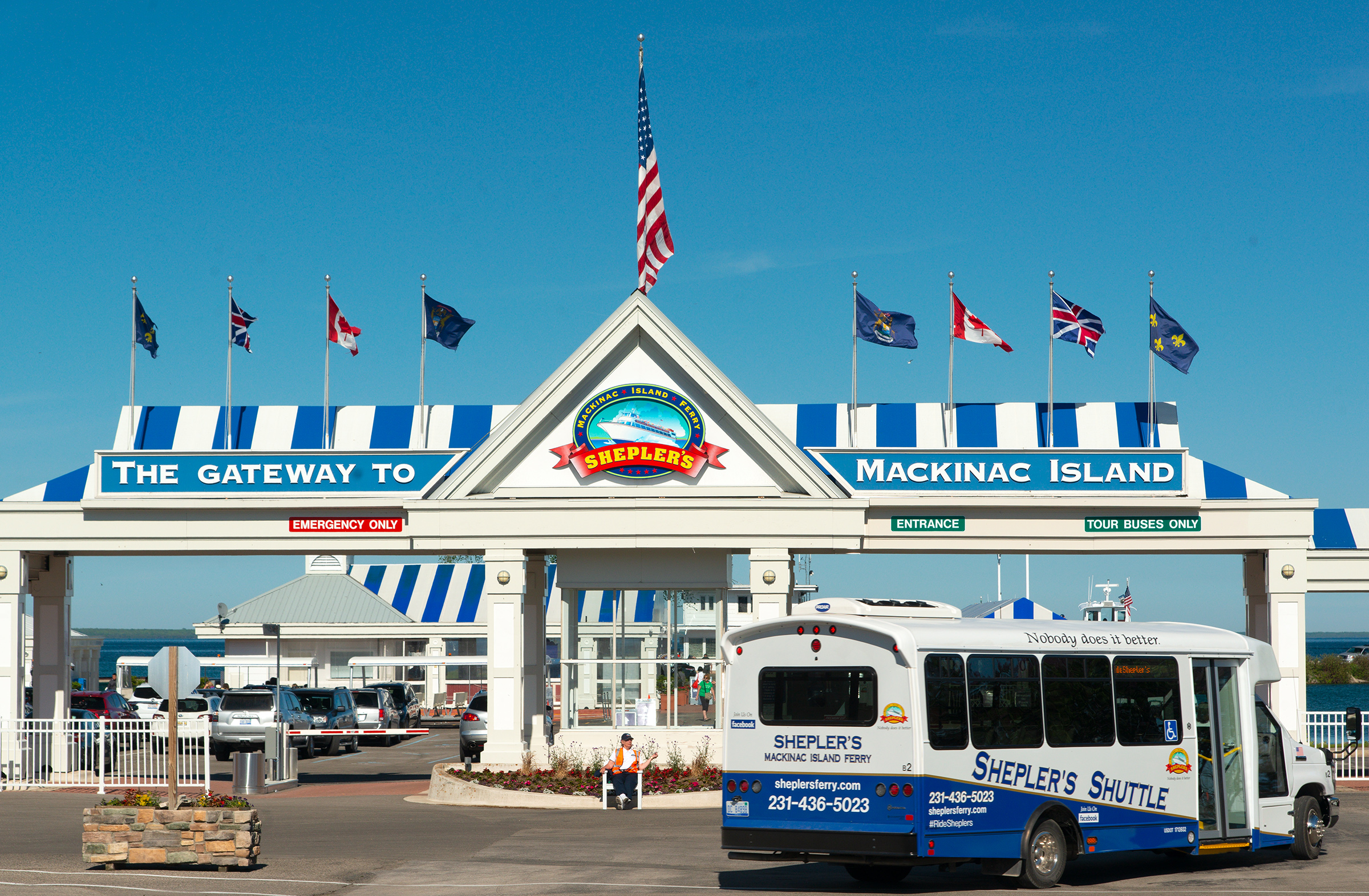
Entrance to the new ferry dock at Mackinaw City (June 2019)

In 1945, Captain William H. Shepler, a native of Mackinac Island, returned to Michigan after service in World War II. He already had a full captain's license and began to command the large, 600-person capacity Algoma between Mackinaw City and Mackinac Island. He also operated a small snack bar for passengers waiting for the ferry. Capt. Shepler decided to offer a more distinctive service with smaller craft to and from Mackinac Island. In the winter of 1950, he built his own Bay Craft kit boat in Cheboygan, a 30-foot (9.1 m) cabin cruiser with twin gas engines with a capacity of 24 passengers. The vessel was christened the Miss Margy after Shepler's wife, Margaret.

The Mackinac Bridge was completed in November 1957. During its construction, crowds came to watch the progress, increasing the need for tour boats. During the winter of 1953, Shepler built a second kit boat, a high-speed cruiser, the Billy Dick, named after the captain's son, William Richard. The fleet expanded over the years.

Following the decline in ferry traffic across the straits, Shepler purchased beach frontage on Mackinac Island and constructed a dock to provide service between the island and the mainland.

In May 1988, Capt. William H. Shepler died, and his wife Margaret died in October 2004. His son, William R., took over the operation with the help of his three children. At that time there were two competitors: Star Line (now Mackinac Island Ferry Company) and Arnold Transit Co.; the latter ceased operations in late 2016. As of 2019, "Bill" remained the CEO of Shepler's, and Chris Shepler was president of the company.

In 2015, the company added a new 85-foot long vessel with a triple engine and 281-person capacity; the new Miss Margy was built in Onaway in Northern Michigan. The vessel has a top speed of about 40 mph. A news report at the time stated that "Sheplers employs 210 with 50 full time and transports 350,000 visitors to Mackinac Island each year". By 2015, the company was running two ferries from St. Ignace, and two from Mackinaw City and had a total of six boats. The newly expanded dock at Mackinaw City was unveiled in April 2019 at the start of the season.

In addition to the ferry service in 2019, the company was offering Lighthouse Cruises through the Straits of Mackinac and on Lake Michigan as well as other sightseeing options. An announcement in June 2019 stated that Shepler's had ordered a $4 million, 210-passenger ferry with four jet drives; this vessel was expected to begin operation the following summer.

In early 2022, the company was purchased by Hoffman Family of Companies.

== Fleet ==
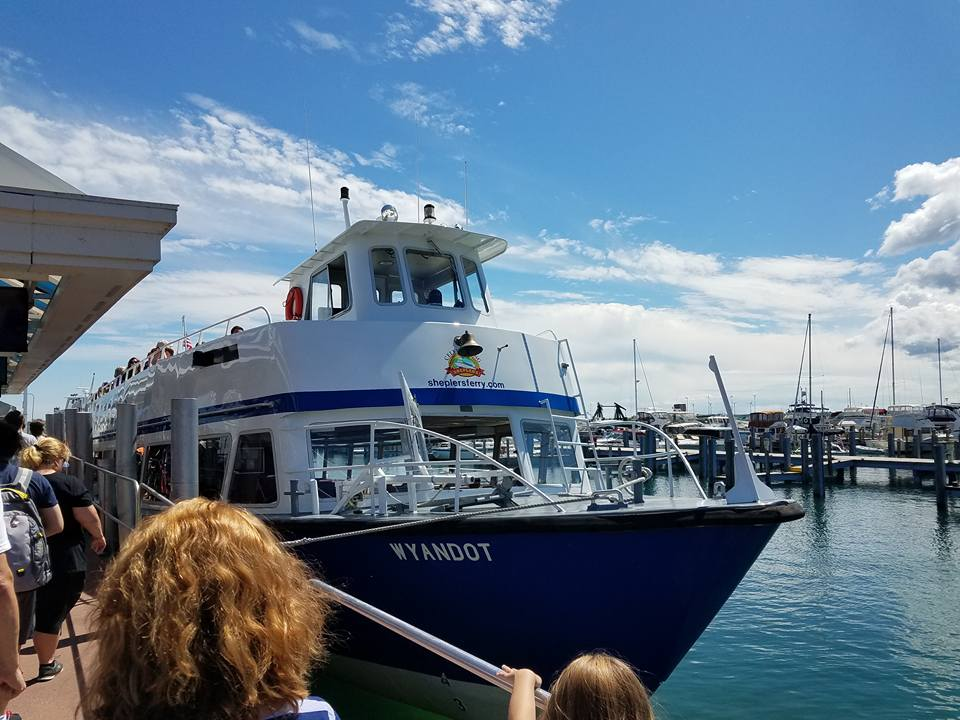
M/V Wyandot Docked in Mackinaw City, MI

The Shepler's fleet consists of seven passenger vessels:

- The Welcome, 60 feet (18 m) x 18 feet (5.5 m), 97-person Twin-Engine vessel built in 1969 by Camcraft in Lafitte, LA
- Felicity, 65 feet (20 m) x 19 feet (5.8 m), 150-person Twin-Engine vessel built in 1972 by Camcraft in Lafitte, LA
- The Hope, 83 feet (25 m) x 19 feet (5.8 m), 150-person Twin-Engine vessel built in 1975 by Camcraft in Lafitte, LA. The Hope was renovated in 2009 by Moran Iron Works in Onaway, MI, adding an additional 17 feet (5.2 m) to her aft deck to accommodate new Twin MTU 2000 Series V16 engines.
- Wyandot, 83 feet (25 m) x 21 feet (6.4 m), 265-person Twin-Engine vessel built in 1979 by Burgeron Shipyards in Crown Point, LA
- Capt. Shepler, 84 feet (26 m) x 21 feet (6.4 m), 265-person Twin-Engine vessel built in 1986 by Camcraft in Lafitte, LA
- Miss Margy, 85 feet (26 m) x 23 feet (7.0 m), 281-person Triple-Engine vessel built in 2015 by Moran Iron Works in Onaway, MI
- William Richard, 84 feet (26 m) x 20 feet (6.1 m), 210-person Quad Jet-Engine vessel built in 2020 by Moran Iron Works in Onaway, MI

The vessels The Welcome, Felicity, The Hope, and Wyandot are named after vessels that previously sailed the Straits of Mackinac in the late 17th century.

The Capt. Shepler was named after Shepler's Late Founder and Former CEO William H. Shepler.

The Miss Margy was named after William H. Shepler's Late Wife, Margaret Shepler. This is the second Shepler's vessel to bear the name of Miss Margy.

The William Richard was named after the Late Former CEO William "Billy Dick" Shepler Jr.
