= Star Line Ferry =

Ferry boat company serving Mackinac Island

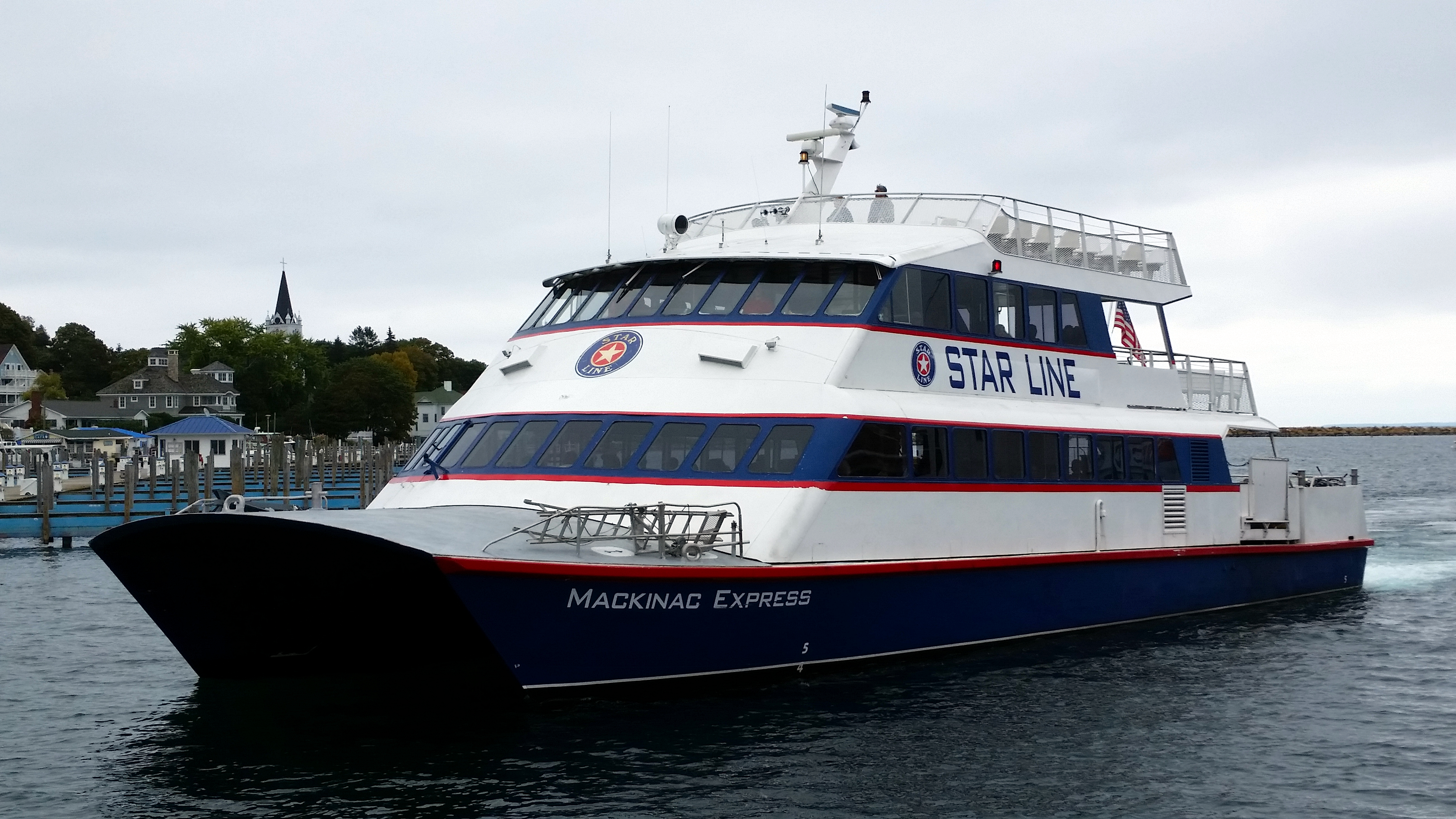
MV Mackinac Express which was bought from the Arnold Transit Company

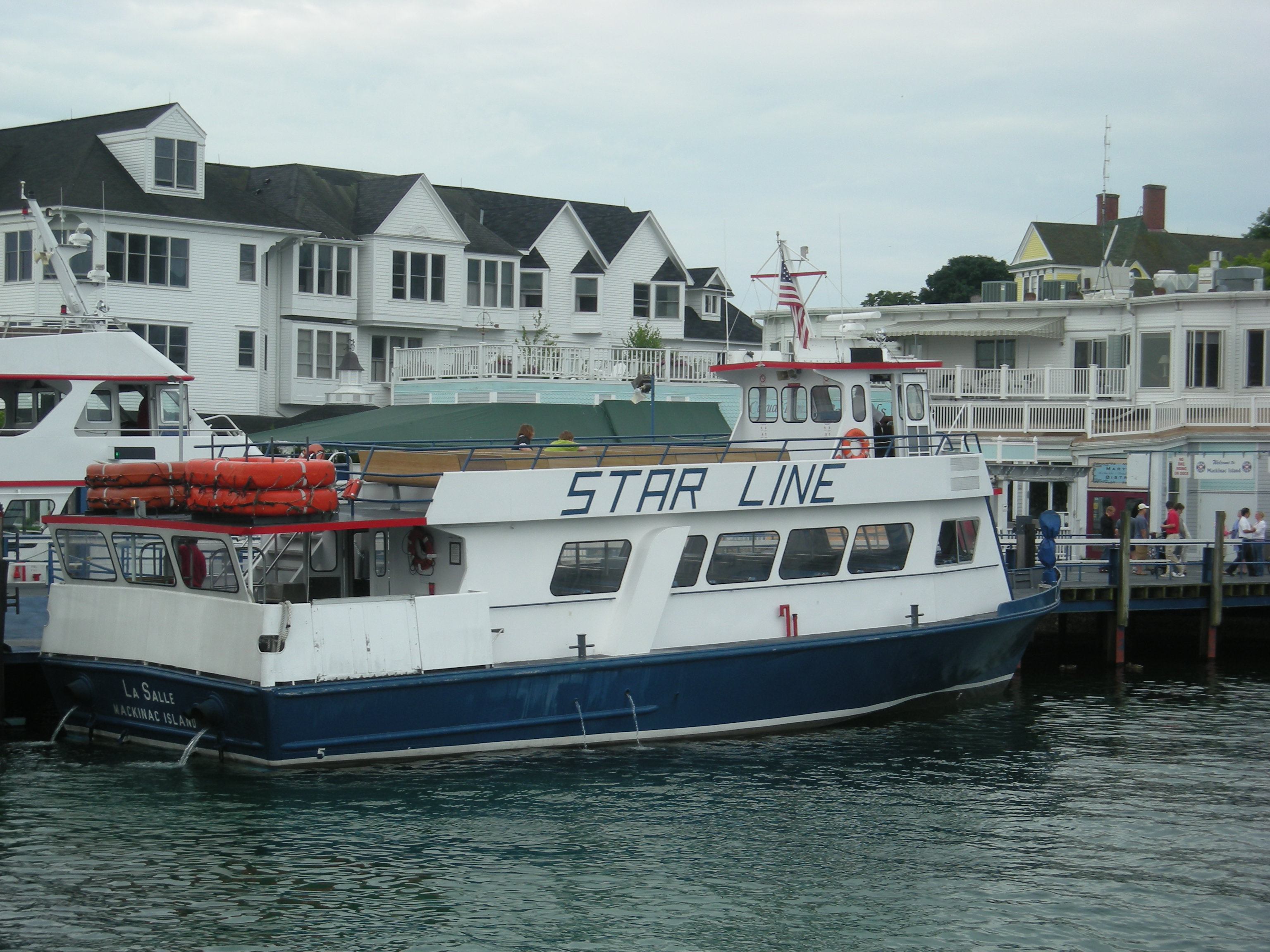
MV La Salle docked at Mackinac Island

Mackinac Island Ferry Company (formerly Star Line) was a ferry boat company serving Mackinac Island in Michigan.

The company had a dock at Mackinaw City and two at St. Ignace. It now operates as Arnold Transit Company

== History ==
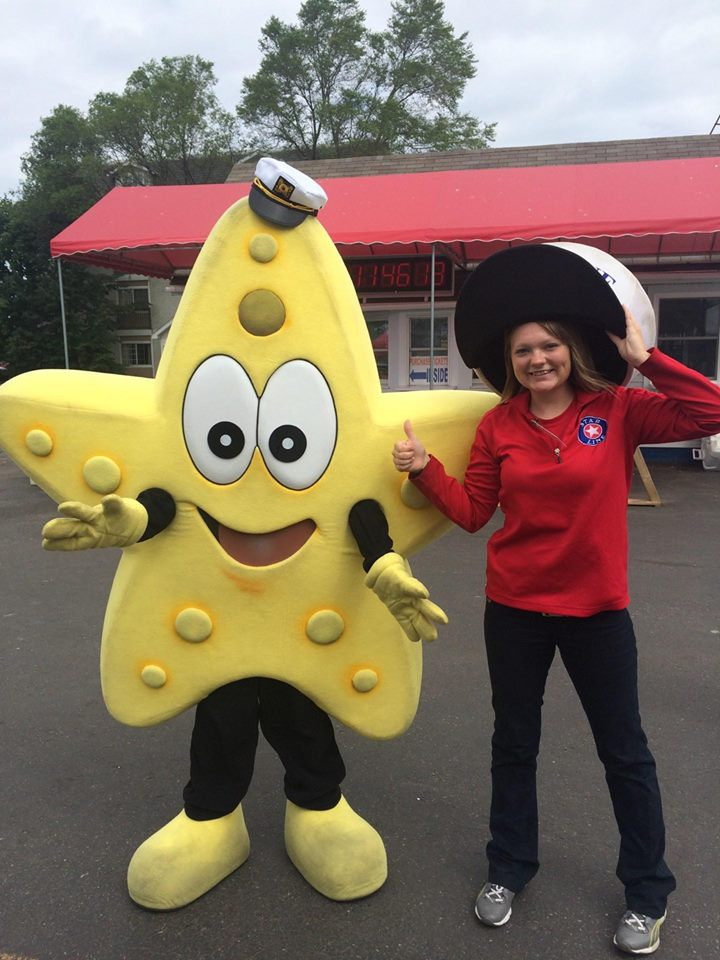
Mackinac Island Ferry Company's Mascot "Skipper" poses with Star Line employee

Star Line Mackinac Island Ferry Company was started by Tom Pfeiffelmann, Sam McIntire, and others in the late 1970s. The company started off previously as Argosy Boat Line. The company was named Star Line after the 5 original stockholders making up a 5 pointed star. In 1979 Star Line brought their first fast ferry, MV Marquette, to the Island. When Arnold Transit Company introduced their catamaran MV Island Express in 1987, Star Line responded with MV Radisson, an 85-foot fast ferry which was modeled after a luxury yacht. She boasted two propellers as the other ferries had, but also had twin hydro-jets for added speed. One hydro pointed out of the water making a large plume of water behind the boat. In time MV La Salle added hydro-jets. In 1990 Star Line added Cadillac and in 1993 added Joliet. These boats were built in the style of MV Radisson. In 2005 the Star Line added MV Marquette II.

In November 2016, Star Line purchased the majority of competitor Arnold Transit Company's assets, assuming the almost 140 years of its history and combining it with that of Star Line's existing fleet. This acquisition made Star Line Mackinac Island's oldest and largest ferry fleet.

Star Line also operated a pleasure cruise on Friday and Saturday evenings from Mackinaw City and St. Ignace, respectively, during the summer months.

In 2019, Star Line added MV Good Fortune pirate ship and offers trips to Mackinac Island as well as daily cruises aboard it during the summer months.

Beginning with the 2022 season, Star Line began the process of changing its name to "Mackinac Island Ferry Company," including both the new name and the existing Star Line logo together. For 2023, the company chose to emphasize their new name, only including "Formerly Star Line" in smaller text alongside its logo.

In June 2024, the company was purchased by Hoffman Family of Companies. In September, Hoffman Marine, part of Hoffman Family of Companies, acquired Mackinac Island Ferry Company and rebranded as Arnold Transit Company.

== Fleet ==
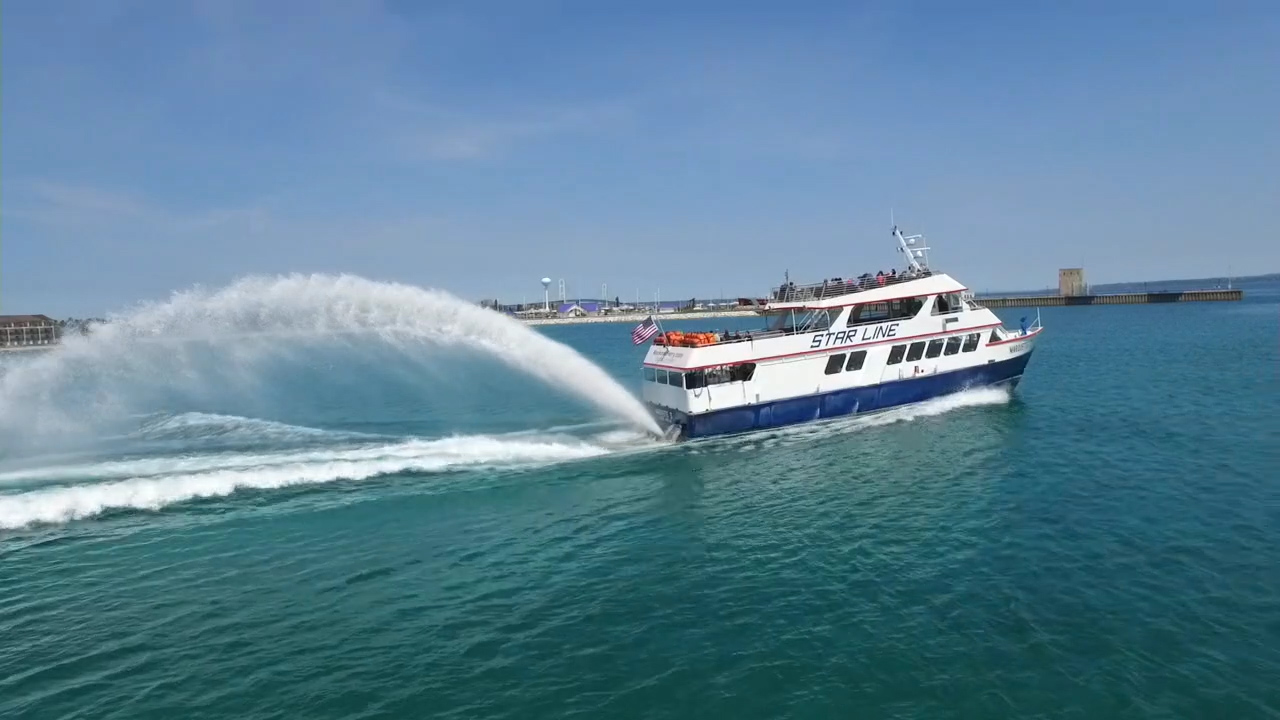
MV Marquette II Hydro-Jet fast ferry leaving the Mackinaw City Dock for Mackinac Island

Mackinac Island Ferry Company had the largest fast ferry fleet in Michigan with six hydro-jet ferries: MV La Salle, MV Radisson, MV Cadillac, MV Joliet, and MV Marquette II. They also own classic ferries MV Anna May, some of the former Arnold Transit Company classic ferries MV Huron, MV Ottawa, Chippewa, MV Straits of Mackinac II, MV Mackinac Express a high-speed water-jet–powered catamaran ferry service passenger service and the only pirate ship on the currently on the Great Lakes MV Good Fortune.
