= Mackinaw City, Michigan =

- Village
- Village of Mackinaw City
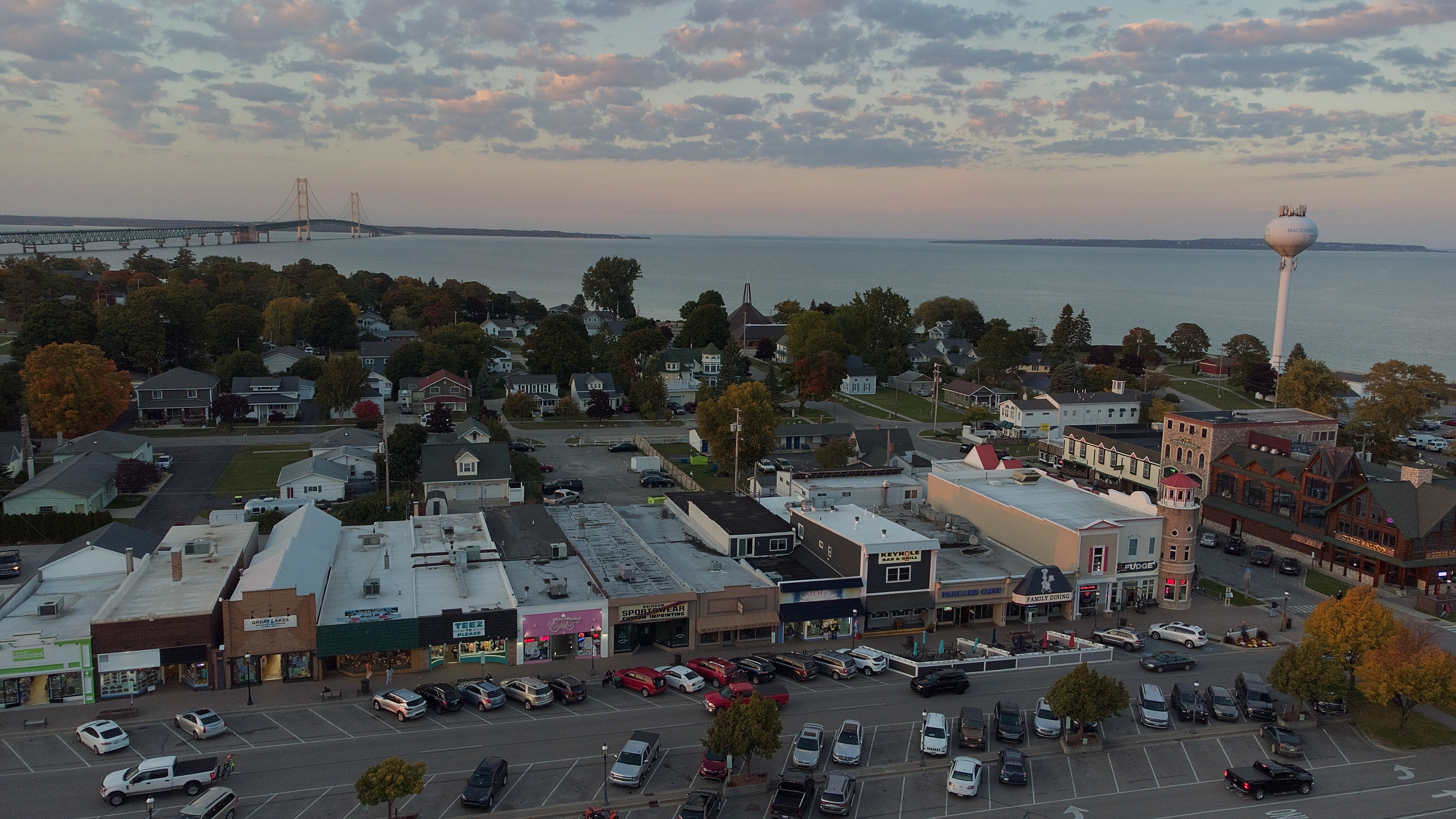
- Downtown Mackinaw City looking north toward the Mackinac Bridge

- Flag
- Nickname: "The Tip of the Mitt"
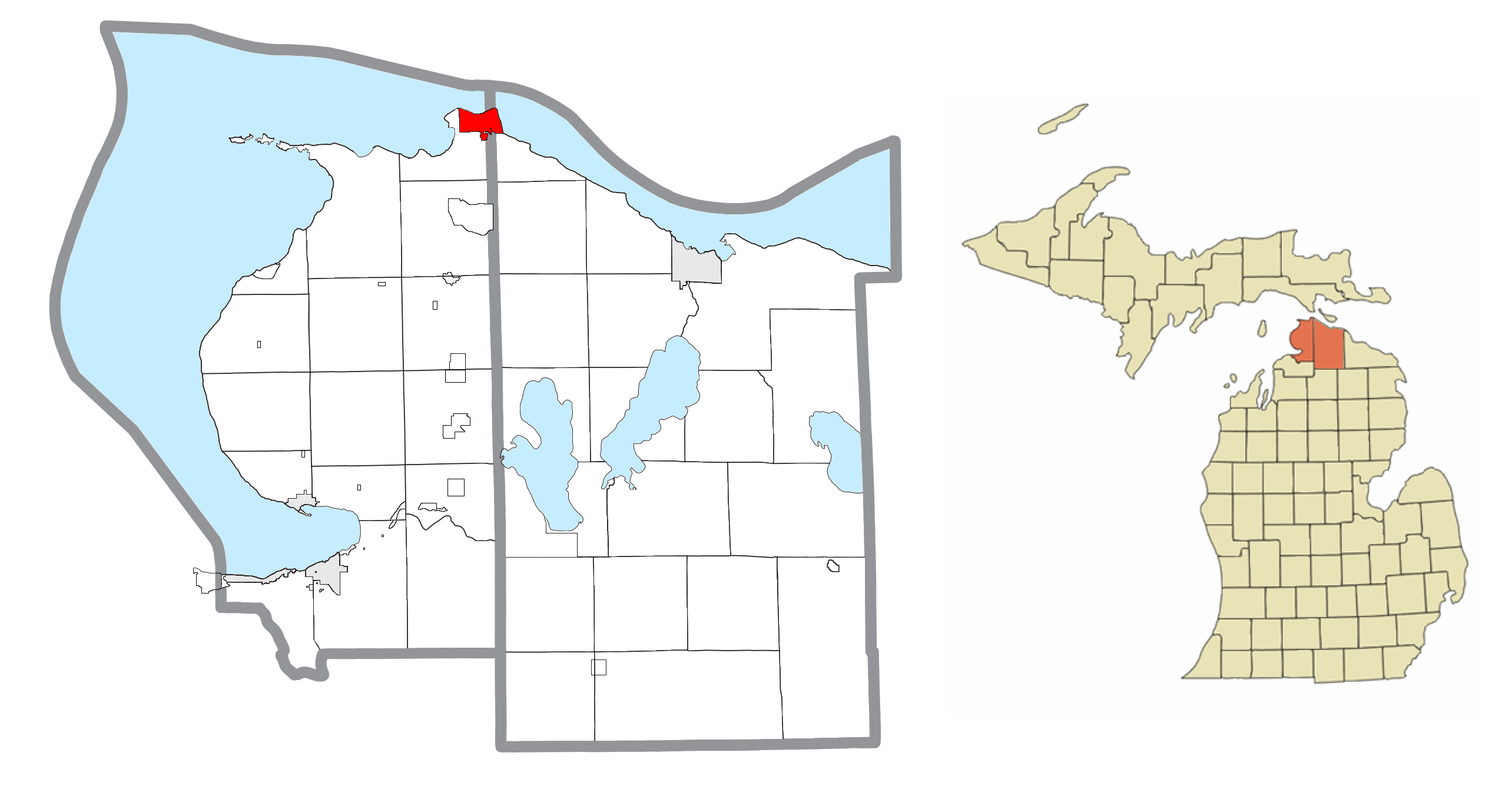
- Location within Emmet County (left) and Cheboygan County (right)

- Location within the state of Michigan Location within the United States
- Coordinates: 45°47′02″N 84°43′40″W
- Country: United States
- State: Michigan
- Counties: Cheboygan and Emmet
- Townships: Mackinaw and Wawatam
- Settled: 1673; 1715 (Fort Michilimackinac)
- Platted: 1857
- Incorporated: 1882

Government
  - Type: Village council
  - President: Scott Newman
  - Clerk: Lana Jaggi
  - Manager: Dean Martin

Area
  - Total: 7.66 sq mi (19.83 km^{2})
  - Land: 3.44 sq mi (8.92 km^{2})
  - Water: 4.21 sq mi (10.91 km^{2})
- Elevation: 597 ft (182 m)

Population (2020)
  - Total: 846
  - Density: 245.93/sq mi (94.95/km^{2})
- Time zone: UTC-5 (EST)
  - Summer (DST): UTC-4 (EDT)
- ZIP code(s): 49701
- Area code: 231
- FIPS code: 26-50320
- GNIS feature ID: 1620662
- Website: Official website

Mackinaw City (/ˈmækənɔː/ MAK-ə-naw) is a village divided between Cheboygan and Emmet counties in the U.S. state of Michigan. It had a population of 846 at the 2020 census.

Mackinaw City is located at the northernmost point of the Lower Peninsula at the southern end of the Mackinac Bridge, which crosses the Straits of Mackinac to the city of St. Ignace in the Upper Peninsula. Mackinaw City and St. Ignace serve as the main access points for ferry service to and from Mackinac Island. Mackinaw City is considered one of Michigan's most popular tourist destinations and includes many historic sites, including Fort Michilimackinac State Park, Old Mackinac Point Light, McGulpin Point Light, and the nearby Dousman's Mill.

== History ==
=== Etymology and early settlement ===
The name of Mackinaw is a respelling of "Mackinac", a strait between Lake Huron and Lake Michigan, an island in the strait, and an important trading-post on the island; ultimately from Ojibwe mishinii-makinaang (“at the place of many snapping turtles”).

The predominant historic tribes in this area were three Algonquian peoples, known collectively as the Council of Three Fires: Ojibwe (Chippewa), Ottawa (Odawa), and Potawatomi at the time of French contact in the 17th century. These peoples had long frequented the surrounding region, which they called Michilimackinac, to fish, hunt, trade, and worship. Mackinac Island in the straits appeared to have the shape of a turtle. The Native Americans here had a creation myth based on the sacred turtle. The Straits of Mackinac was the center of two routes vital to the fur trade: one to Montreal in the east, by way of Lake Nipissing and the Ottawa River valley; and the other to Detroit in the south via Lakes Huron and St. Clair.

=== European exploration and Fort Michilimackinac ===
The first European to pass the site of Mackinaw City was Jean Nicolet, sent out from Quebec City by Samuel Champlain in 1633 to explore and map the western Great Lakes, and to establish new contacts and trading partnerships with the Indian tribes of the region. His reports resulted in the French government providing funds to send settlers, missionaries, traders, and soldiers to the Great Lakes region. Father Jacques Marquette had established a mission on Mackinac Island in 1671 (which was shortly thereafter moved to St. Ignace on the Michigan peninsula, where it remained active until 1705). The construction of Fort de Buade at St. Ignace in 1681 was an attempt by the authorities of New France to establish a military presence at the Straits, but it closed in 1697.

Mackinaw City's first European settlement came in 1715 when the French built Fort Michilimackinac. They lost it to the British during the Seven Years' War, and the British abandoned the fort in 1783, after the American Revolutionary War resulted in independence of its Thirteen Colonies. The site of the fort in present-day Mackinaw City is a National Historic Landmark and is now preserved as an open-air historical museum. As with the forts at other settlements of the era and region such as Detroit, Michilimackinac was a fairly small post. It housed French civilians inside the fort, and allowed them to garden, hunt, and fish outside the walls. It was a trading post for the fur trade.

At the end of the French and Indian War (1754–1763), the British took possession of the fort, but continued to allow the French civilians to live within the walls, as they had good relations with the Odawa and Ojibwe for the fur trade. As a part of Pontiac's Rebellion, Chippewa and Meskwaki warriors captured the fort on June 2, 1763, in a surprise attack during a game of baggatiway or lacrosse; the British at the fort were taken prisoner and mostly killed.

Europeans, in the form of French and Scots-Irish traders from Detroit and elsewhere, did not return until the following spring, with the understanding that they would trade more fairly with the Native Americans. The British abandoned the vulnerable site on the mainland during the American Revolutionary War; from 1779 to 1781, the troops moved the fort, including its buildings, to Mackinac Island, where they established Fort Mackinac. What the British did not take with them, they burned; that way they could prevent the American rebels from using Michilimackinac as a base.

=== Mackinaw City from mid-19th century to present ===
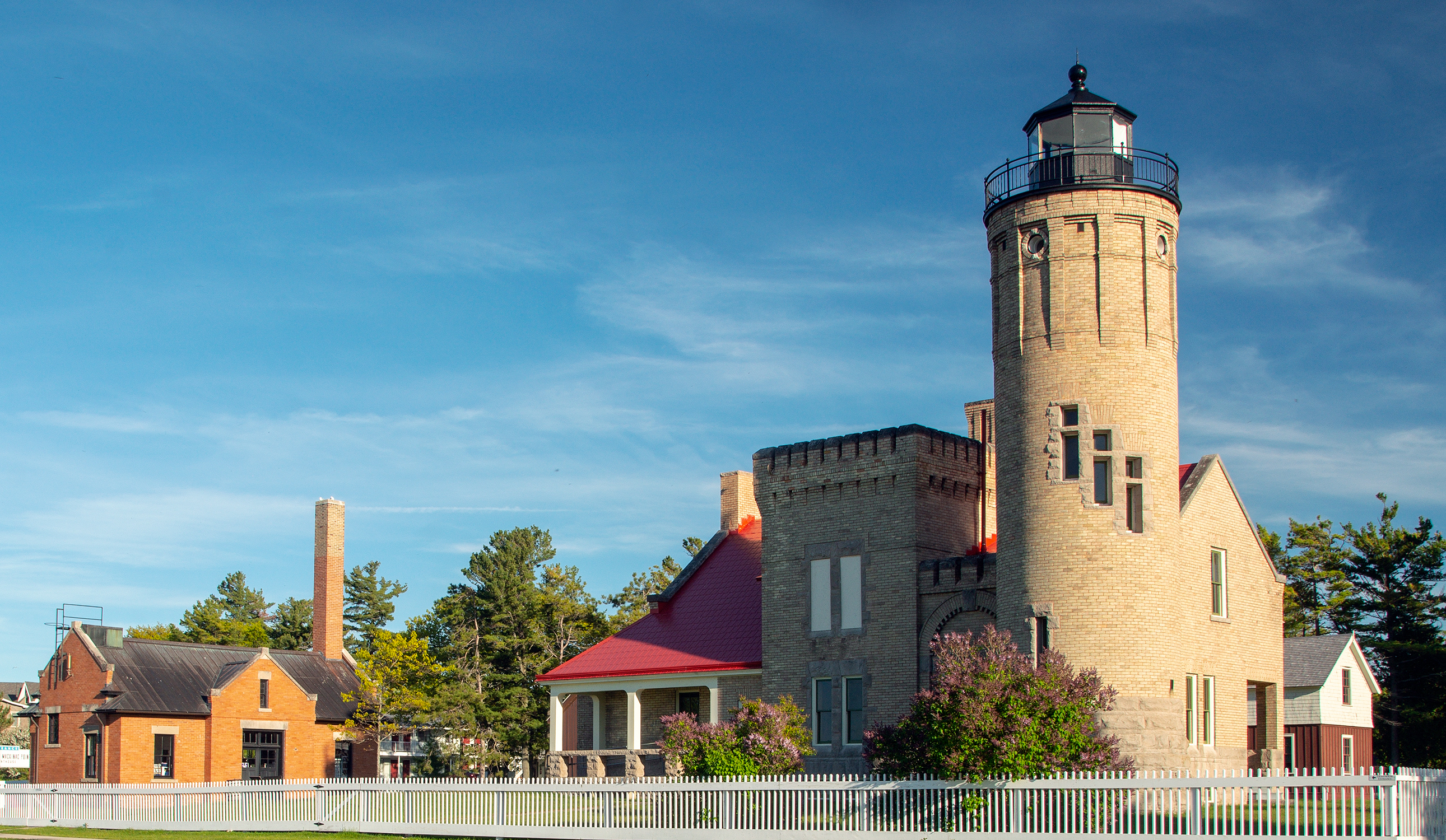
Old Mackinac Point Lighthouse

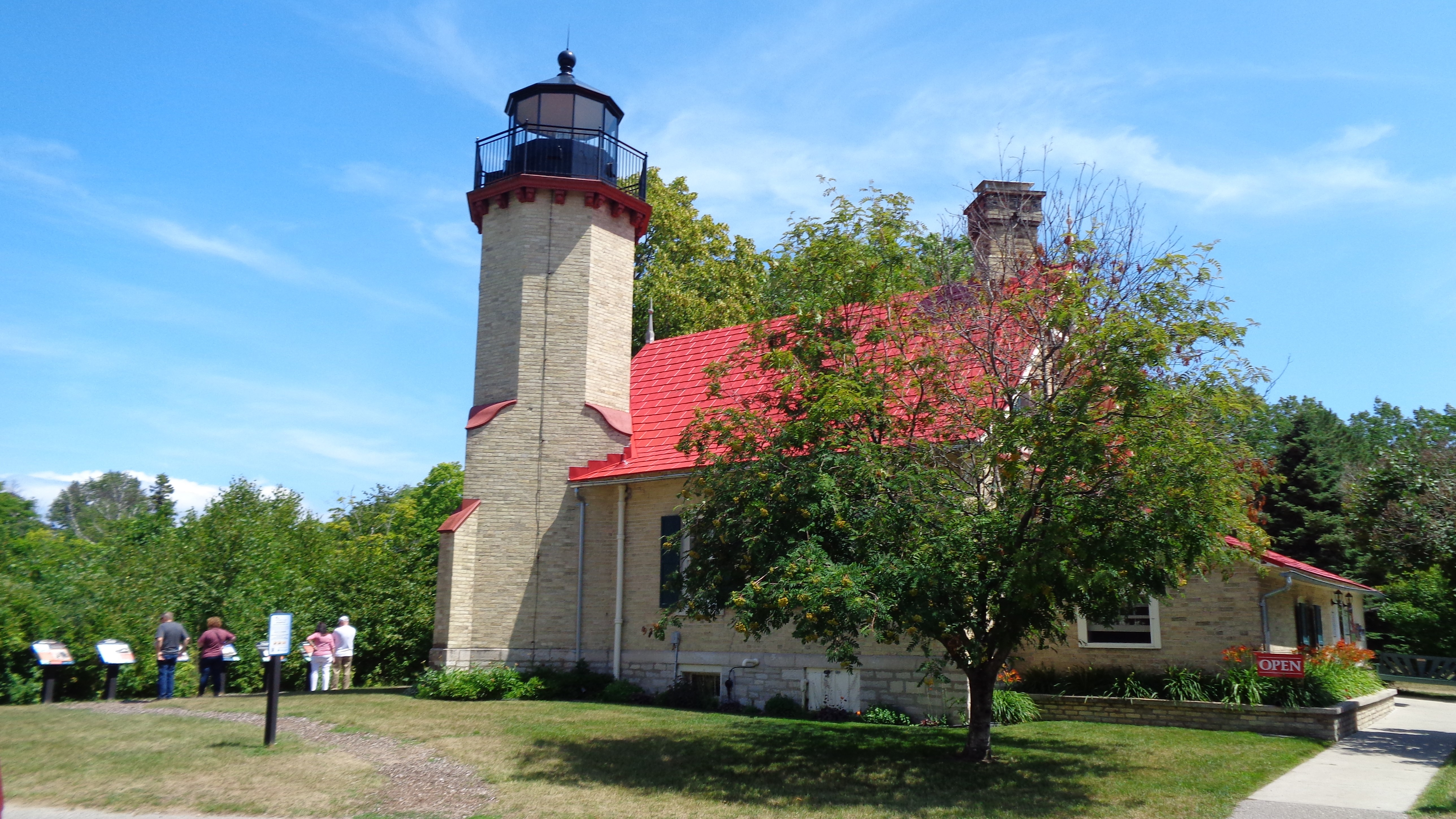
McGulpin Point Light

In 1857, two men by the names of Conkling and Searles planned what would become Mackinaw City. The original plan reserved the northern portion as a park, to preserve the area that was once Fort Michilimackinac and to accommodate a hoped-for lighthouse. This was not built for nearly a generation after the land was set aside.

During the second half of the 1800s, the Mackinaw area (and northern Michigan in general) saw an increase in summer resort tourism. In 1875, Mackinac National Park became the second National Park in the United States after Yellowstone National Park in the Rocky Mountains.

Old Mackinac Point Lighthouse began operation in 1889 and the adjacent Fog Signal Building was built in 1906. This lighthouse, which operated until 1957, would eventually replace McGulpin Point Light, which operated between 1869 and 1906, at its location in the far western end of the village limits, with the current address of 500 Headlands Road.

The village became a vital port for train ferries crossing the Straits beginning in the 1890s, and later, for ferries for automobiles. In the 1890s, Mackinaw had one newspaper, the Mackinaw Witness, published weekly by Presbyterian missionary Rev. G. W. Wood, Jr.

Auto ferries began running in the early 1900s. Camping began in Michilimackinac State Park in 1907.

When the Mackinac Bridge was completed in 1957, the Old Mackinac Point Lighthouse was decommissioned immediately thereafter. At the same time, a grant was provided to the Mackinac Island State Park Commission, which owned the property at the Bridge's southern terminus, to begin archeological excavations of the Michilimackinac ruins. Ultimately, a reconstruction of the fort to its 1770s appearance would be constructed.

Auto ferries, which had been running since the early 1900s, ended in 1957 after the completion of the Mackinac Bridge.

Train ferries crossed the Straits until 1984. Mackinaw City remains an important port city for tourists traveling by passenger ferry boat to Mackinac Island using Shepler's ferry company, and Star Line services.

Through the course of time, the main industry of Mackinaw City became almost strictly tourist-oriented, with other major sources of employment being civic services such as mail, police, firefighting, schooling, and so on. Camping, which began in Michilimackinac State Park in 1907, was halted in 1971 as a Maritime Park was opened in 1972 around the lighthouse. This park was shut down in 1990, but Old Mackinac Point Lighthouse was opened to the public in 2004. Dousman's Mill (formerly Historic Mill Creek State Park), which includes the area believed to be where Mill Creek's sawmill once flourished when Mackinac Island was being settled, is located about five miles (8 km) southeast of the village along U.S. Highway 23 (US 23).

== Geography ==
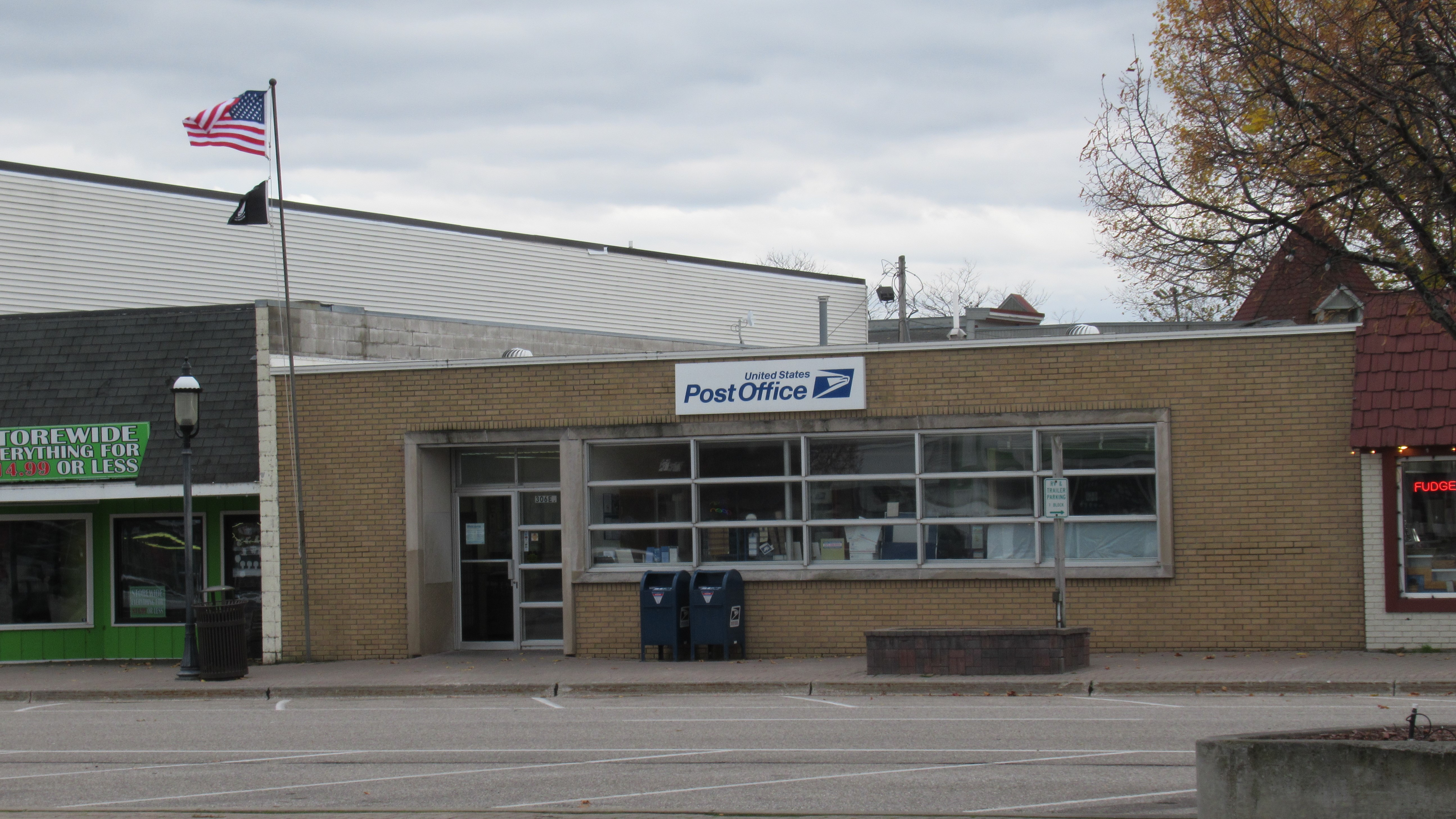
U.S. Post Office in Mackinaw City

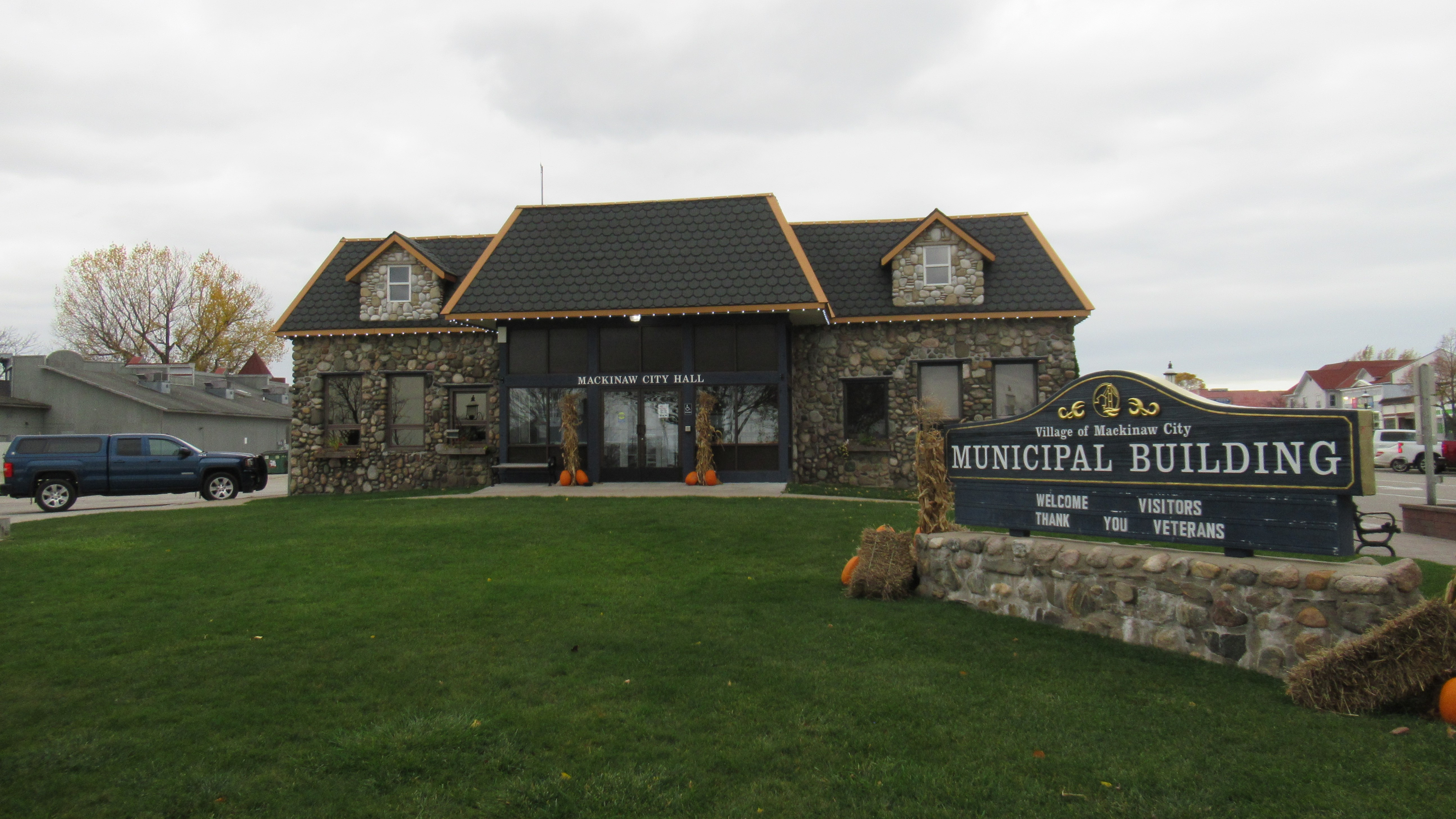
Mackinaw City Municipal Building

According to the U.S. Census Bureau, the village has a total area of 7.65 square miles (19.81 km^{2}), of which 3.44 square miles (8.91 km^{2}) is land and 4.21 square miles (10.90 km^{2}) is water.

The village of Mackinaw City includes the northernmost point of Michigan's Lower Peninsula. It lies along the Straits of Mackinac, and thus contains shorelines on both Lake Huron and Lake Michigan.

The southern approach of the Mackinac Bridge is located within Mackinaw City, bisecting the village.

=== Climate ===
This climatic region has large seasonal temperature differences, with warm to hot (and often humid) summers and cold (sometimes severely cold) winters. According to the Köppen Climate Classification system, Mackinaw City has a humid continental climate, abbreviated "Dfb" on climate maps.

Climate data for Mackinaw City, Michigan
Month	Jan	Feb	Mar	Apr	May	Jun	Jul	Aug	Sep	Oct	Nov	Dec	Year
Mean daily maximum °C (°F)	−3 (27)	−1 (31)	5 (41)	13 (55)	20 (68)	25 (77)	27 (81)	26 (79)	21 (70)	14 (58)	7 (44)	0 (32)	13 (55)
Mean daily minimum °C (°F)	−15 (5)	−15 (5)	−9 (15)	−3 (27)	3 (38)	8 (47)	11 (52)	10 (50)	6 (42)	0 (32)	−4 (24)	−11 (13)	−2 (29)
Average precipitation mm (inches)	46 (1.8)	33 (1.3)	53 (2.1)	58 (2.3)	64 (2.5)	84 (3.3)	86 (3.4)	97 (3.8)	89 (3.5)	61 (2.4)	56 (2.2)	48 (1.9)	770 (30.4)
Source: Weatherbase

== Demographics ==
Historical population
Census	Pop.	Note	%±
1890	333		—
1900	564		69.4%
1910	697		23.6%
1920	679		−2.6%
1930	875		28.9%
1940	922		5.4%
1950	970		5.2%
1960	934		−3.7%
1970	810		−13.3%
1980	820		1.2%
1990	875		6.7%
2000	859		−1.8%
2010	806		−6.2%
2020	846		5.0%
U.S. Decennial Census

=== 2010 census ===
As of the census of 2010, there were 806 people, 413 households, and 206 families residing in the village. The population density was 238.5 inhabitants per square mile (92.1/km^{2}). There were 814 housing units at an average density of 240.8 per square mile (93.0/km^{2}). The racial makeup of the village was 87.8% White, 5.3% African American, 4.3% Native American, 0.1% from other races, and 2.4% from two or more races. Hispanic or Latino of any race were 2.4% of the population.

There were 413 households, of which 18.6% had children under the age of 18 living with them, 39.2% were married couples living together, 7.3% had a female householder with no husband present, 3.4% had a male householder with no wife present, and 50.1% were non-families. 41.9% of all households were made up of individuals, and 19.1% had someone living alone who was 65 years of age or older. The average household size was 1.95 and the average family size was 2.62.

The median age in the village was 49.5 years. 16.5% of residents were under the age of 18; 4.1% were between the ages of 18 and 24; 23.5% were from 25 to 44; 31.1% were from 45 to 64; and 24.8% were 65 years of age or older. The gender makeup of the village was 45.2% male and 54.8% female.

=== 2000 census ===
As of the census of 2000, there were 859 people, 404 households, and 244 families residing in the village. The population density was 255.3 inhabitants per square mile (98.6/km^{2}). There were 630 housing units at an average density of 187.3 per square mile (72.3/km^{2}). The racial makeup of the village was 93.02% White, 0.12% African American, 4.54% Native American, 0.12% Asian, and 2.21% from two or more races. Hispanic or Latino of any race were 0.81% of the population.

There were 404 households, out of which 21.5% had children under the age of 18 living with them, 48.5% were married couples living together, 9.4% had a female householder with no husband present, and 39.6% were non-families. 34.4% of all households were made up of individuals, and 15.8% had someone living alone who was 65 years of age or older. The average household size was 2.12 and the average family size was 2.67.

In the village, the population was spread out, with 20.6% under the age of 18, 5.0% from 18 to 24, 24.9% from 25 to 44, 30.7% from 45 to 64, and 18.7% who were 65 years of age or older. The median age was 45 years. For every 100 females, there were 88.0 males. For every 100 females age 18 and over, there were 86.3 males.

The median income for a household in the village was $37,031, and the median income for a family was $43,125. Males had a median income of $31,771 versus $30,125 for females. The per capita income for the village was $18,725. About 7.5% of families and 9.7% of the population were below the poverty line, including 13.5% of those under age 18 and 2.8% of those age 65 or over.

== Transportation ==
=== Major highways ===
- I-75 is a major north–south freeway running the length of the state. From the Ohio border just north of Toledo, it proceeds northerly via Detroit, Flint, Saginaw, and Grayling, crosses the Mackinac Bridge after passing through the village and continues on to the Upper Peninsula and Sault Ste. Marie.
- US 23 has its northern terminus in the village. It is designated as the "Sunrise Side Coastal Highway", and follows the Lake Huron shoreline south toward Cheboygan and Alpena.
- US 31 ends at I-75 four miles (6.4 km) south of the village, continuing southerly toward along the Lake Michigan coast toward Petoskey, Traverse City and Muskegon.
- C-81 is a County-Designated Highway running southerly toward Harbor Springs and Petoskey.

=== Ferry service ===
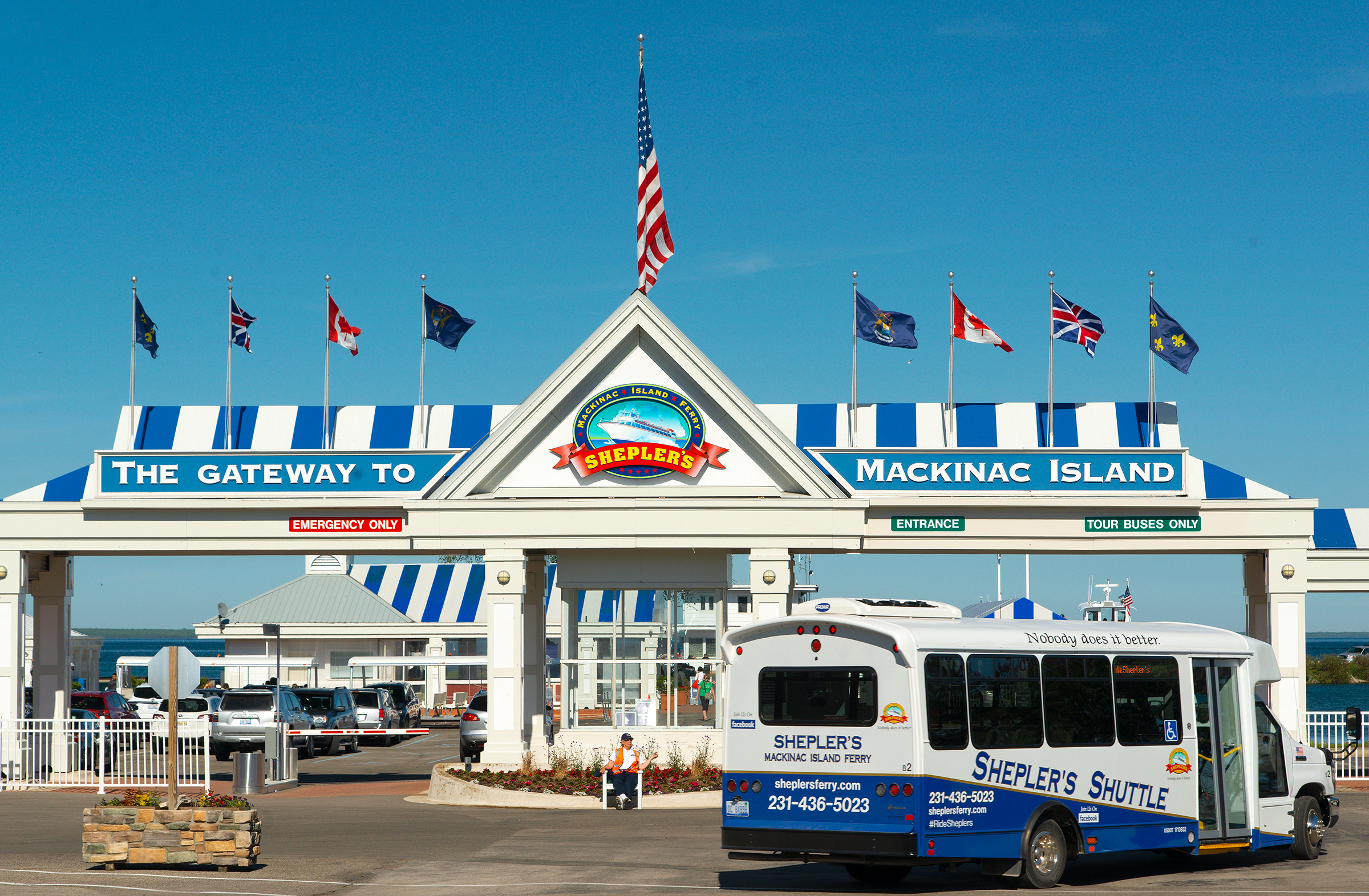
Shepler's Ferry dock

Two ferry companies operate out of Mackinaw City, connecting tourists and commuters to Mackinac Island: Shepler's Ferry and Star Line Ferry.

=== Bus service ===
Indian Trails provides daily intercity bus service between St. Ignace and East Lansing, Michigan and between St. Ignace and Bay City, Michigan. Transfer between the lines is possible in Mackinaw City.

=== Railways ===
The New York Central's Michigan Central subsidiary, the Pennsylvania Railroad's Grand Rapids and Indiana Railroad subsidiary, and other rail lines provided passenger traffic on trains such as the Northern Arrow to Mackinaw City. After the creation of the Penn Central in 1968, rail traffic diminished and the rail infrastructure deteriorated. The state invested greatly into the failing railways and established the Michigan Northern Railway to operate passenger and freight operations in the early 1980s. Despite sizable patronage, passenger services, as well as freight, operated in the red, prompting the state government to reassess its commitment to operations of the Michigan Northern Railway. All subsidies terminated in 1984, and the lines were sold to CSX Transportation in 1987. It dismantled the tracks shortly thereafter.

The former Michigan Central line to Mackinaw City was improved under the Rails to Trails program. It was rededicated in 2008 as the North Central State Trail, providing a public right-of-way from Mackinaw City to Gaylord.

=== Air ===
The nearest airports with scheduled passenger service are in Pellston Regional Airport, Cherry Capital Airport in Traverse City, and Alpena County Regional Airport in the Lower Peninsula and Chippewa County International Airport south of Sault Ste. Marie, in the eastern Upper Peninsula.

== Government ==
The official name of the community is "The Village of Mackinaw City" and as that suggests, it is a village by state law. Mackinaw City is governed by the General Law Village Act, Public Act No. 3, of 1895, as amended. The downtown district and much of the development lie within Mackinaw Township, Cheboygan County, but the larger portion of the village by area is in Wawatam Township, Emmet County, which borders Mackinaw Township to the west.

== Education ==
Mackinaw City Public Schools provides Mackinaw City students with education. The town’s two schools, the elementary school (grades K-5) and the junior-senior high school (grades 6–12), are located in the same building.

== Religious affiliations ==
Mackinaw City is within the Roman Catholic Diocese of Gaylord and the Episcopal Diocese of Eastern Michigan.
