= Fort Michilimackinac =

Archaeological site in Michigan, United States

- U.S. National Register of Historic Places
- U.S. National Historic Landmark
- Michigan State Historic Site
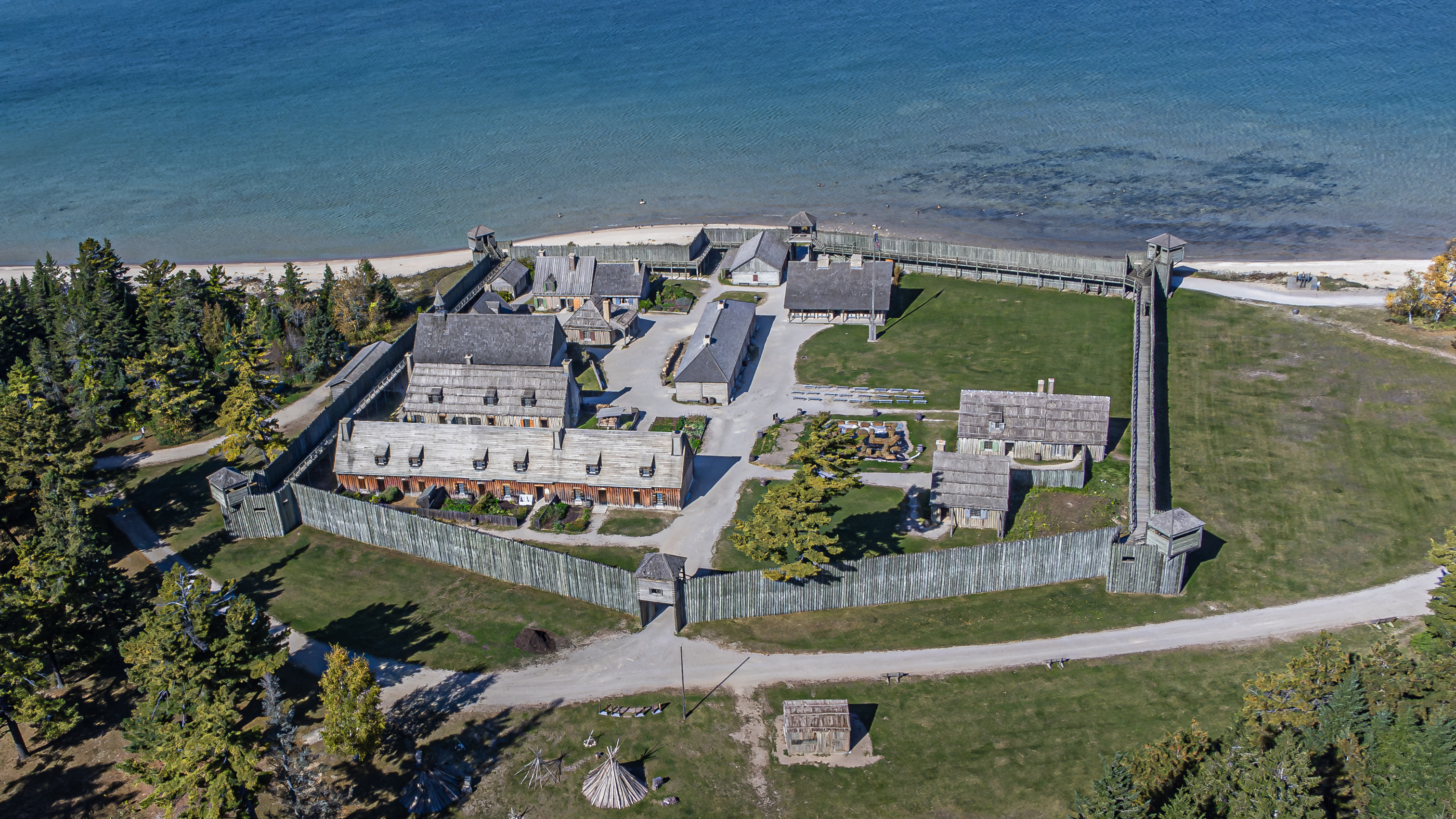
- Location: Near Mackinac Bridge, Mackinaw City, Michigan
- Built: 1715
- NRHP reference No.: 66000395
- MSHS No.: P565

Significant dates
- Added to NRHP: October 15, 1966
- Designated NHL: October 9, 1960
- Designated MSHS: February 18, 1956

Colonial Michilimackinac Historic State Park
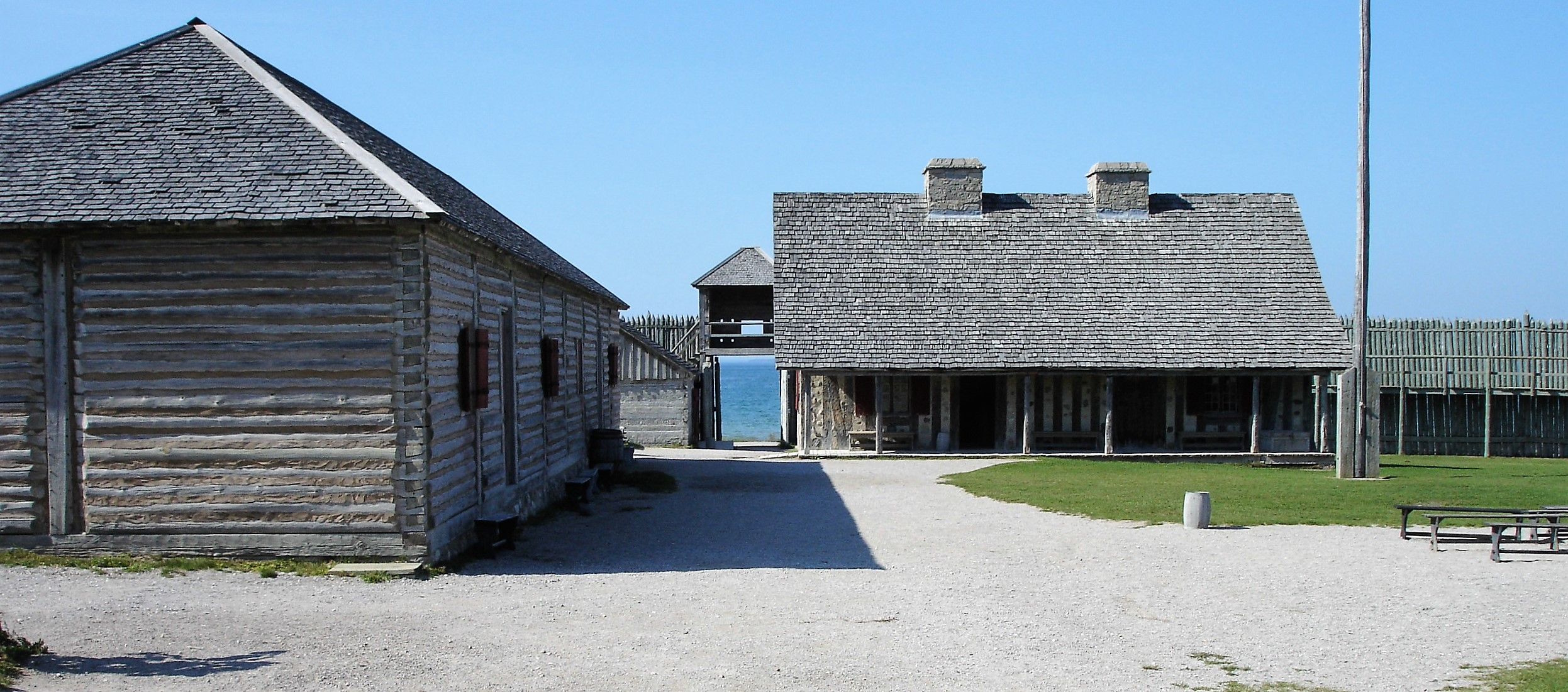

- Location within Michigan Location within the United States
- Location: Wawatam Township, Emmet County, Michigan, United States
- Coordinates: 45°47′12″N 84°44′9.52″W
- Area: 37 acres (15 ha)
- Administrator: Michigan Department of Natural Resources
- Designation: Michigan state park
- Website: Official website

Fort Michilimackinac (/ˌmɪʃələˈmækənɔː/ MISH-ə-lə-MAK-ə-naw) was an 18th-century French, and later British, fort and trading post at the Straits of Mackinac; it was built on the northern tip of the lower peninsula of the present-day state of Michigan in the United States. Built around 1715, and abandoned in 1783, it was located along the straits that connect Lake Huron and Lake Michigan of the Great Lakes of North America. A reconstruction of the fort is preserved as the main feature of Colonial Michilimackinac Historic State Park.

The present-day village of Mackinaw City developed around the site of the fort, which has been designated as a National Historic Landmark. It is preserved as an open-air historical museum, with several reconstructed wooden buildings and palisades, and is now part of the state park.

== History ==
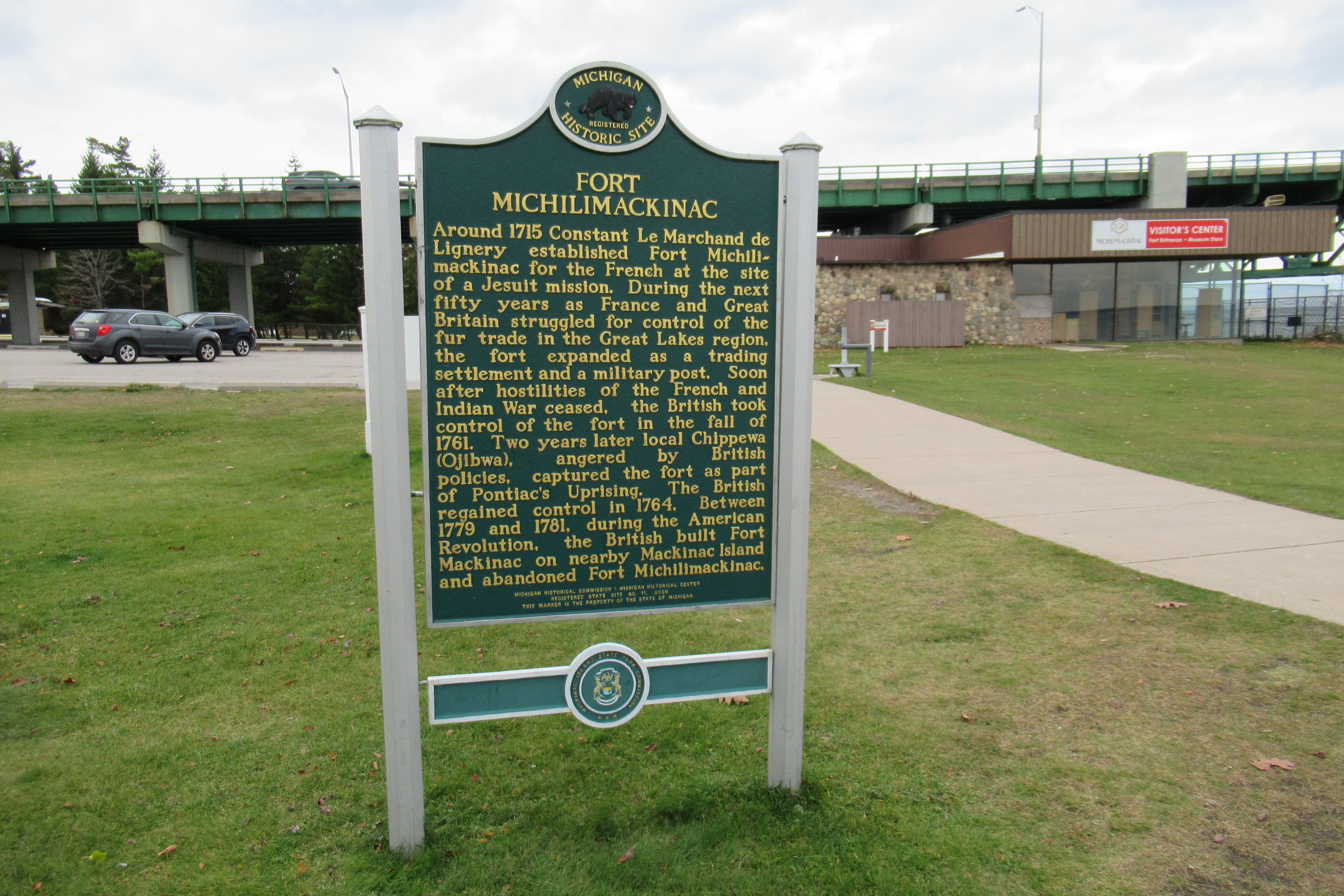
Fort Michilimackinac state historic marker

The primary purpose of the fort was as part of the French-Canadian trading post system, which stretched from the Atlantic Coast and the St. Lawrence River to the Great Lakes, and south to the Mississippi River through the Illinois Country. The fort served as a supply depot for traders in the western Great Lakes.

The French first established a presence in the Straits of Mackinac in 1671, when Father Marquette founded the Jesuit St. Ignace Mission at present-day St. Ignace in the Upper Peninsula of Michigan. In 1683, they augmented the mission with Fort de Buade. In 1701, Sieur de Cadillac moved the French garrison to Fort Detroit and closed the mission.

By 1713, however, the French decided to re-establish a presence along the Straits of Mackinac, and built the wooden Fort Michilimackinac on the northern tip of the lower peninsula. They sent Constant le Marchand de Lignery with a contingent of soldiers and workmen in 1715 to accomplish the job. Over the decades, they made several modifications and expansions to the palisade walls. Chevalier Jacques Testard de Montigny, who was a Lieutenant and a Knight of the Order of St. Louis, was appointed in 1730 and served for three years as commandant of the fort. He was previously commandant of Fort La Baye (Green Bay, Wisconsin). Many of his relatives settled in Michigan.

The French relinquished the fort, along with their territory in Canada, to the British in 1761 following their defeat in the French and Indian War, the North American front of the Seven Years' War. The British continued to operate the fort as a major trading post, but most residents were French and Métis (Ojibwe-French), who spoke predominantly French and worshipped at Sainte Anne Church in a small log structure. Other civilian residents included British fur traders, some of whom resided within the fort in the southeastern row house.

The Ojibwe in the region soon became dissatisfied with British policies, particularly their cancellation of the annual policy of distributing gifts to the Indians. On June 4, 1763, as part of the larger conflict known as Pontiac's War, a group of Ojibwe staged a game of baaga'adowe (a forerunner of modern lacrosse) outside the fort as a ruse to gain entrance. After entering the fort, they killed most of the British inhabitants. They held the fort for a year before the British regained control, promising to offer more and better gifts to the native inhabitants of the area.

The British eventually determined that the wooden fort on the mainland was too vulnerable. In 1781 they built a limestone fort on nearby Mackinac Island. Now known as Fort Mackinac, it was initially named Fort Michilimackinac. Over the next two years, the British moved related buildings to the island by dismantling them and moving them across the water in the summer and over the ice in the winter. Ste. Anne's Church was also moved. Patrick Sinclair, the lieutenant governor of Michilimackinac, ordered the remains of the original Fort Michilimackinac to be burned after the move.

The fort was captured by the British on July 17, 1812, being the first land engagement of the War of 1812 in the United States. Americans attempted, but failed, to recapture the fort on August 4, 1814, and the fort remained in British hands until the war ended in 1815. The British issued an extremely rare 4 dollar banknote during their occupation.

== Archaeological research and reconstruction ==
In 1933, the fort palisade was reconstructed and a small museum opened within the fort.

The first archaeological investigation of the fort began in the summer of 1959, when the Mackinac Island State Park Commission contracted with Michigan State University, and has continued each summer since, as of 2025. The 1933 fort palisade was demolished in 1960, and the reconstruction of the fort based on the archaeological investigation began.

Archaeological efforts moved beyond the fort from 1970-1973, resulting in the discovery of three houses, before returning inside the fort walls from 1974 onwards.

From 1959 to 1966, onsite workers were inmates at the Pellston Corrections Camp in Emmet County, Michigan. Recent onsite archaeology teams have both paid and volunteer staff members.

As of 2024, there is evidence of at least 40 structures inside the fort walls, of which about 65% have been reconstructed. The following structures have been archaeologically excavated and reconstructed as of 2024:

- King's Storehouse – excavated between 1959 and 1966, reconstructed between 1959 and 1969
- Priest's House – excavated between 1959 and 1966, reconstructed between 1959 and 1969
- Church of Ste. Anne – excavated between 1959 and 1966, reconstructed between 1959 and 1969
- Soldiers' Barracks – excavated between 1959 and 1966, reconstructed between 1959 and 1969
- Guardhouse
- Military Latrine
- Blacksmith Shop
- Powder Magazine – excavated from 1974 and through at least 1977
- Commanding Officer's House
- Northwest Rowhouse
- Southwest Rowhouse
- Southeast Rowhouse – excavated in part in the 1970s and still ongoing, partially reconstructed
- South Southeast Rowhouse – excavated in part in 1970's
- South Southwest Rowhouse – partially excavated in the 1960's and continued from 1998 to 2007, reconstructed in 2013

== Today ==
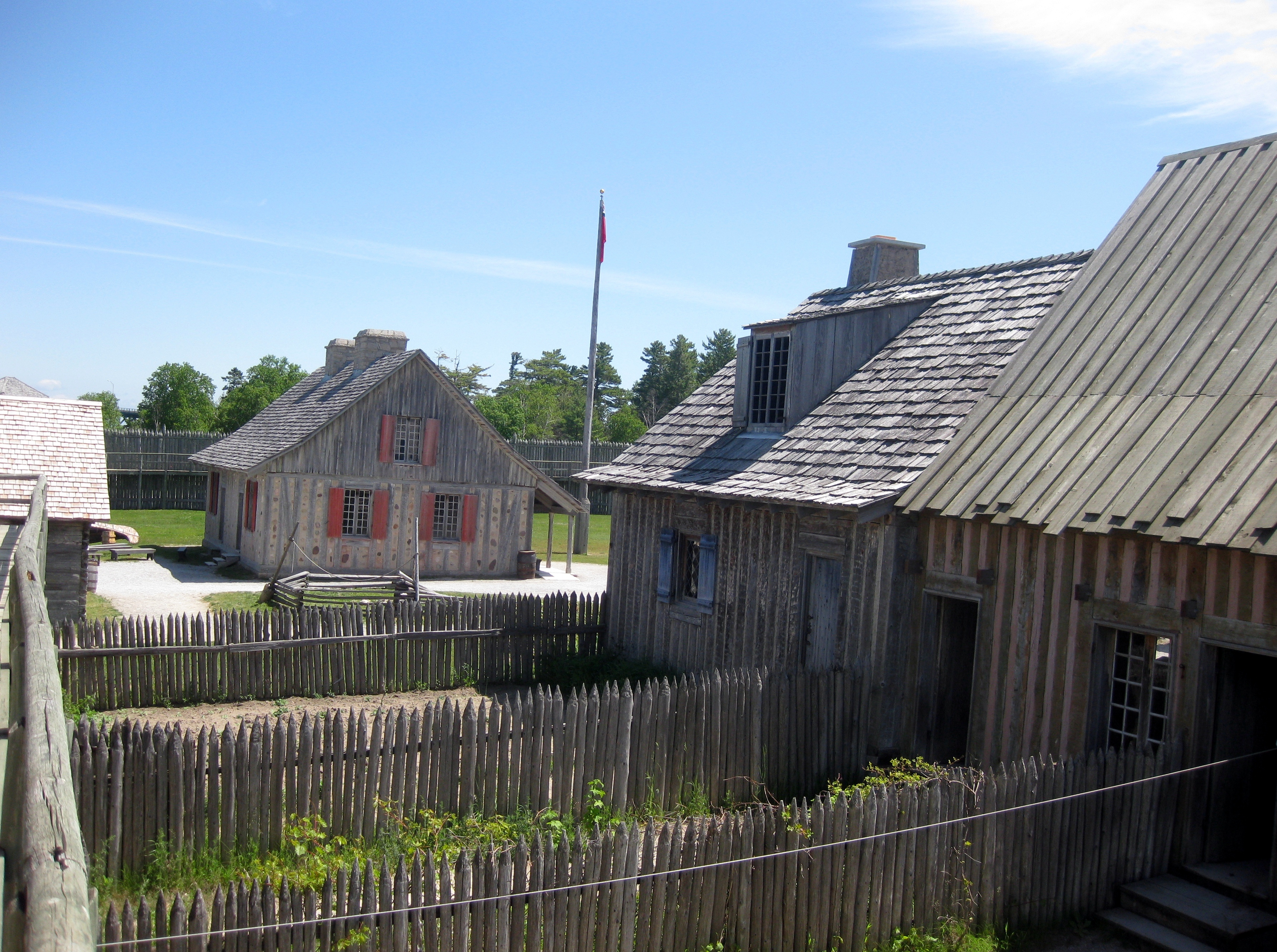
Recreated buildings inside the fort

In 1960 the fort grounds were designated a National Historic Landmark. The grounds were then restored, largely through archaeologically informed reconstruction, as a tourist attraction. As of 2024, the fort and grounds operate as part of Colonial Michilimackinac Historic State Park in Mackinaw City, a major component of the Mackinac State Historic Parks. Interpreters, both paid and volunteer, help bring the history to life with music, live demonstrations and reenactments, including musket and cannon firing demonstrations. The archaeological excavation at Colonial Michilimackinac is one of the longest running excavations in the United States, with excavations occurring every year since 1959.

The state park grounds feature the foot of the Mackinac Bridge, the Old Mackinac Point Lighthouse, dating from 1892, a day-use park with a view of the Mackinac Bridge and Mackinac Island, and a visitor center with gift shop.

== See also ==
- List of National Historic Landmarks in Michigan
- National Register of Historic Places listings in Emmet County, Michigan
