= Wawatam Township, Michigan =

- Civil township
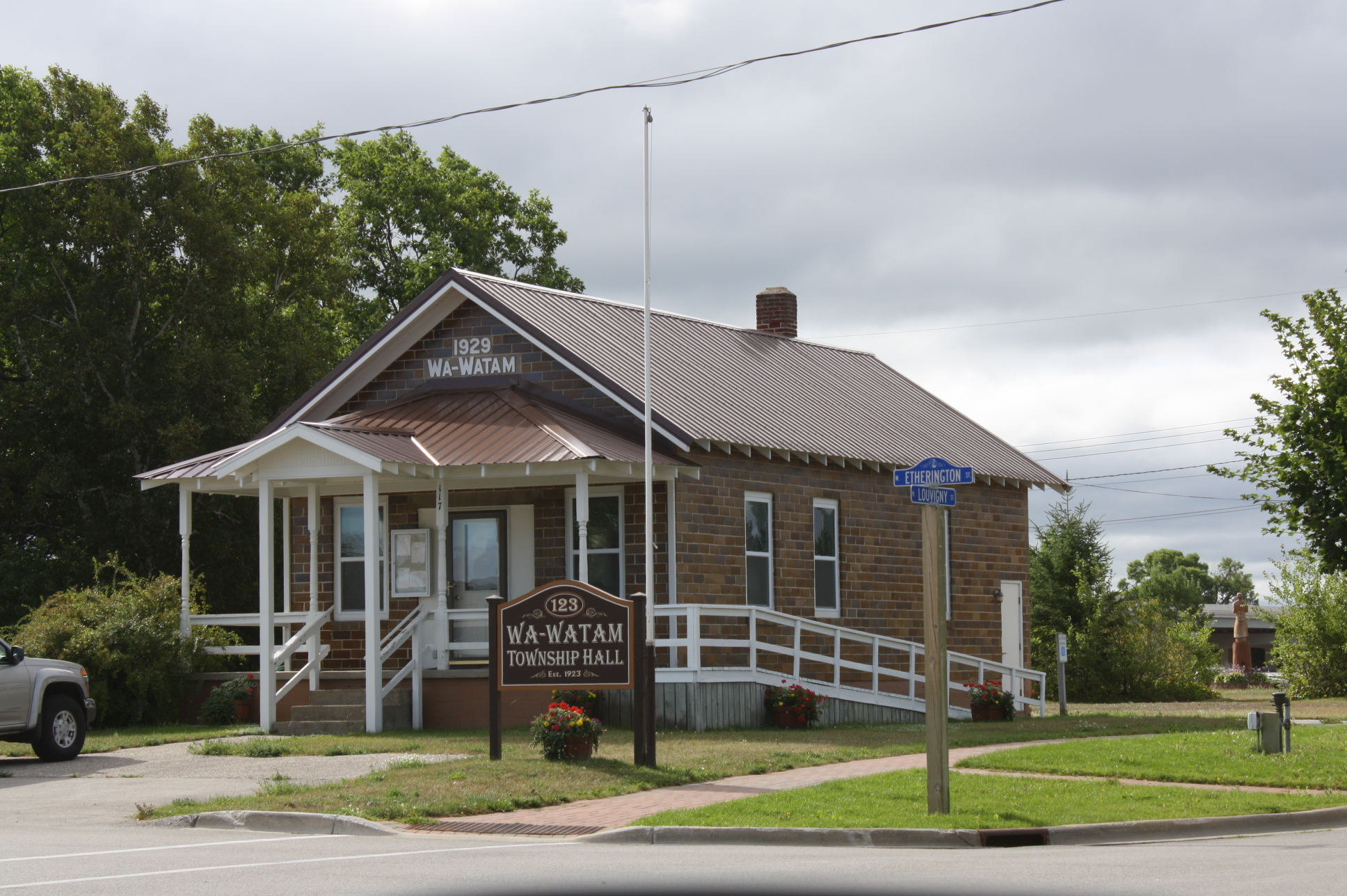
- Wawatam Township Hall

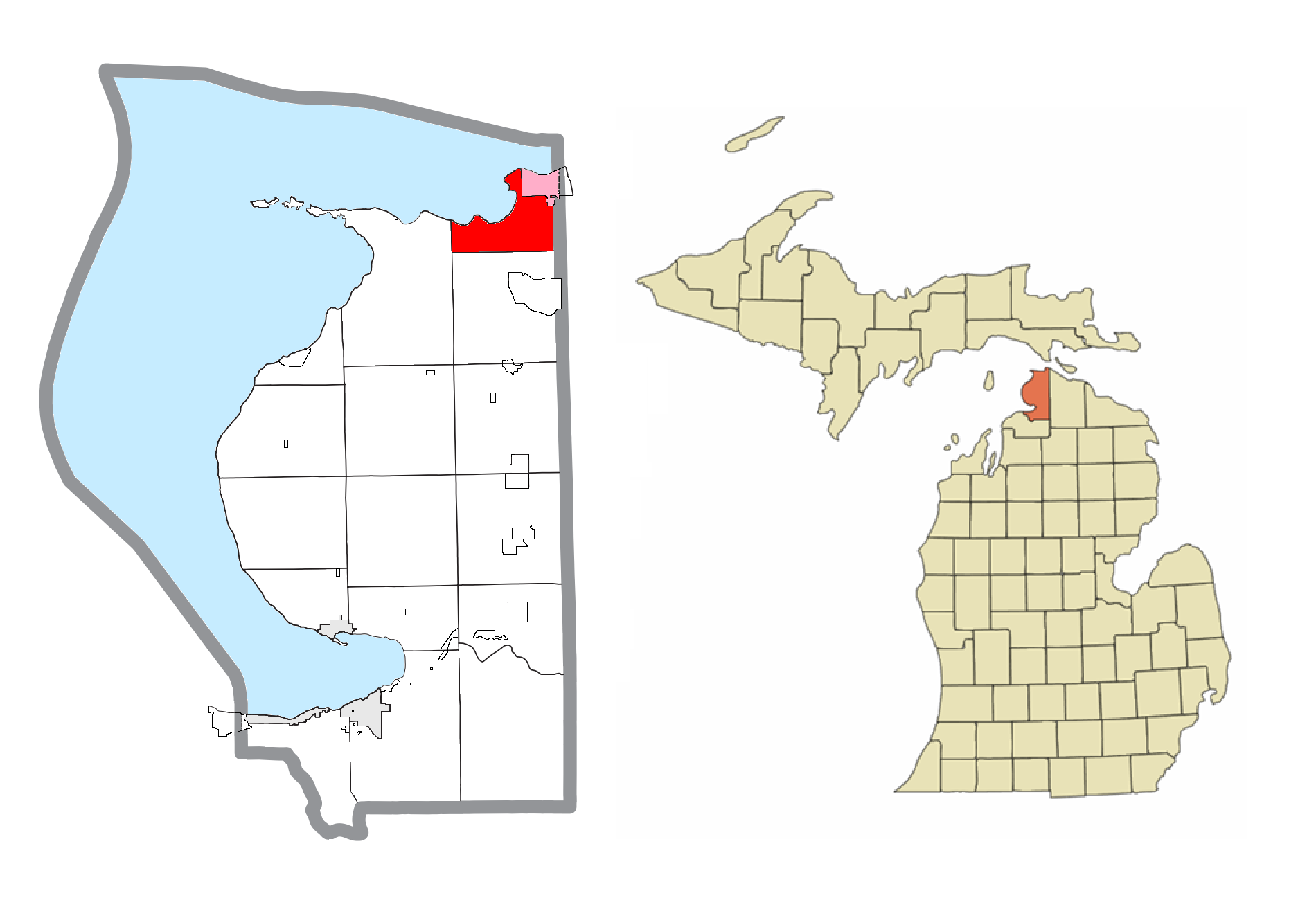
- Location within Emmet County (red) and an administered portion of the village of Mackinaw City (pink)

- Location within the state of Michigan Wawatam Township (the United States)
- Coordinates: 45°46′27″N 84°45′47″W
- Country: United States
- State: Michigan
- County: Emmet
- Established: 1923

Government
  - Supervisor: Roger Moore
  - Clerk: Michelle Karll

Area
  - Total: 20.38 sq mi (52.8 km^{2})
  - Land: 15.73 sq mi (40.7 km^{2})
  - Water: 4.65 sq mi (12.0 km^{2})
- Elevation: 594 ft (181 m)

Population (2020)
  - Total: 711
  - Density: 45.2/sq mi (17.5/km^{2})
- Time zone: UTC-5 (Eastern (EST))
  - Summer (DST): UTC-4 (EDT)
- ZIP code(s): 49701 (Mackinaw City); 49718 (Carp Lake)
- Area code: 231
- FIPS code: 26-84840
- GNIS feature ID: 1627230
- Website: Official website

Wawatam Township is a civil township of Emmet County in the U.S. state of Michigan. As of the 2020 census, the township population was 711.

The village of Mackinaw City is located mostly within the township.

The township is named after Wawatam, an Odawa chief noted for rescuing British trader Alexander Henry the elder from the Ojibwas' capture of Fort Michilimackinac in 1763.

== Communities ==
- Mackinaw City is a village located at 45°47′02″N 84°43′40″W in the northeast portion of the township. Mackinaw City is also located in the northeast portion of Mackinaw Township. I-75 runs through Mackinaw City, and the southern end of the Mackinac Bridge is located in the village.

== Geography ==
According to the United States Census Bureau, the township has a total area of 20.38 square miles (52.8 km^{2}), of which 15.73 square miles (40.7 km^{2}) is land and 4.65 square miles (12.0 km^{2}) (22.82%) is water. The township contains a large inland lake, French Farm Lake.

== Demographics ==
As of the census of 2000, there were 705 people, 329 households, and 207 families residing in the township. The population density was 44.8 inhabitants per square mile (17.3/km^{2}). There were 587 housing units at an average density of 37.3 per square mile (14.4/km^{2}). The racial makeup of the township was 94.33% White, 0.28% African American, 4.40% Native American, 0.14% Asian, and 0.85% from two or more races. Hispanic or Latino of any race were 0.85% of the population.

There were 329 households, out of which 23.1% had children under the age of 18 living with them, 52.9% were married couples living together, 7.3% had a female householder with no husband present, and 36.8% were non-families. 31.9% of all households were made up of individuals, and 16.4% had someone living alone who was 65 years of age or older. The average household size was 2.14 and the average family size was 2.66.

In the township the population was spread out, with 20.4% under the age of 18, 4.5% from 18 to 24, 24.0% from 25 to 44, 29.1% from 45 to 64, and 22.0% who were 65 years of age or older. The median age was 46 years. For every 100 females, there were 90.0 males. For every 100 females age 18 and over, there were 85.8 males.

The median income for a household in the township was $35,909, and the median income for a family was $46,875. Males had a median income of $32,188 versus $30,536 for females. The per capita income for the township was $19,525. About 5.1% of families and 7.5% of the population were below the poverty line, including 13.0% of those under age 18 and 1.4% of those age 65 or over.
