= Mackinaw Township, Michigan =

- Civil township
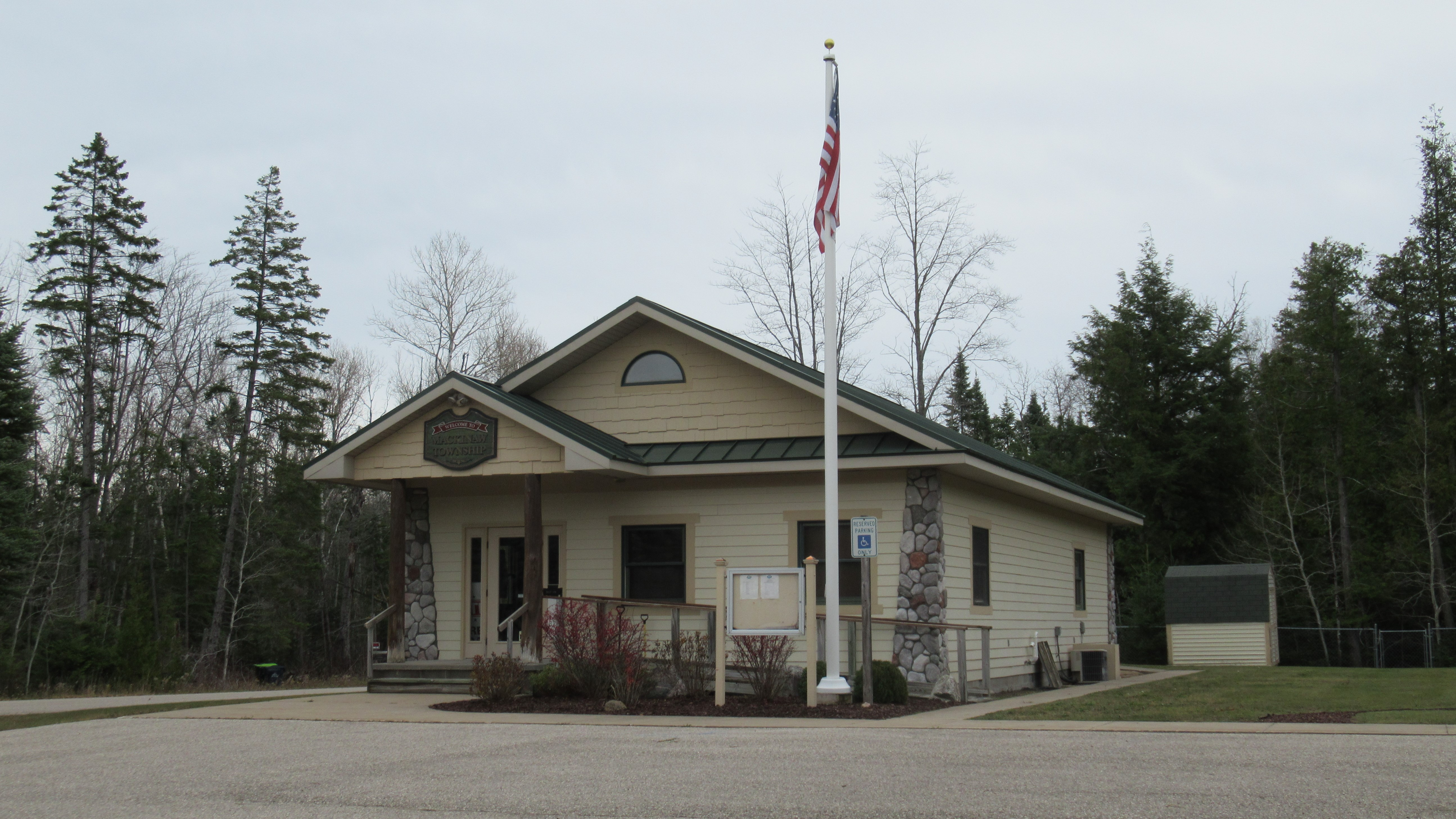
- Mackinaw Township Hall

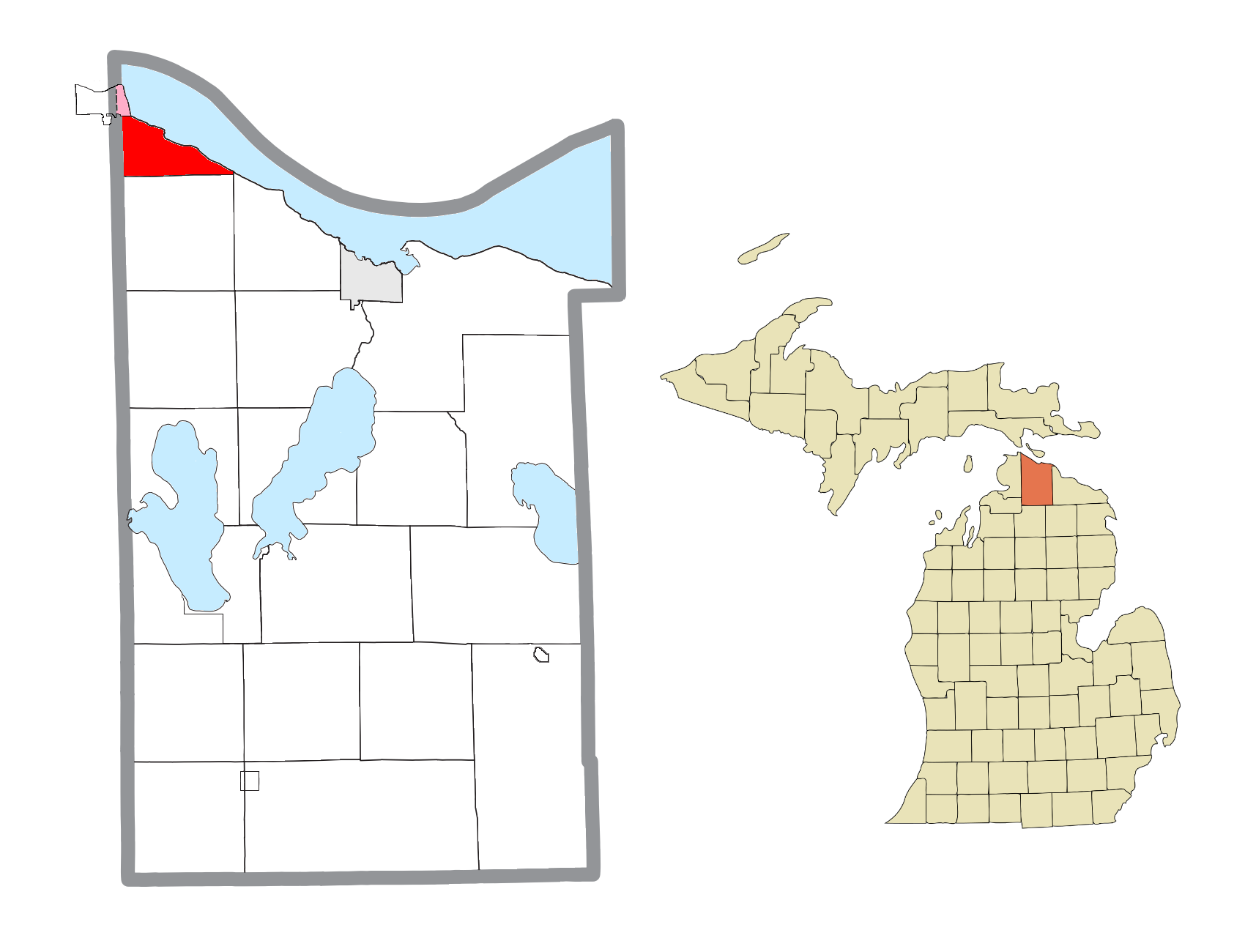
- Location within Cheboygan County (red) and a portion of the administered village of Mackinaw City (pink)

- Location within the state of Michigan Location within the United States
- Coordinates: 45°45′41″N 84°42′17″W
- Country: United States
- State: Michigan
- County: Cheboygan
- Established: 1881

Government
  - Supervisor: Michael Smydra
  - Clerk: Ashley Darrow

Area
  - Total: 12.45 sq mi (32.25 km^{2})
  - Land: 11.41 sq mi (29.55 km^{2})
  - Water: 1.04 sq mi (2.69 km^{2})
- Elevation: 692 ft (211 m)

Population (2020)
  - Total: 491
  - Density: 35.8/sq mi (13.8/km^{2})
- Time zone: UTC-5 (Eastern (EST))
  - Summer (DST): UTC-4 (EDT)
- ZIP code(s): 49701 (Mackinaw City); 49718 (Carp Lake); 49721 (Cheboygan)
- Area code: 231
- FIPS code: 26-50300
- GNIS feature ID: 1626655
- Website: Official website

Mackinaw Township is a civil township of Cheboygan County in the U.S. state of Michigan. The population was 491 at the 2020 census.

== Communities ==
- Freedom is a small unincorporated community on the shore of the Straits of Mackinac at 45°44′09″N 84°38′27″W in the northeast portion of the township. It is located on U.S. Highway 23 about 3.5 miles (5.6 km) southeast of Mackinaw City and about 8 miles (13 km) northwest of Cheboygan.
- Mackinaw City is a village located at 45°47′02″N 84°43′40″W in the northwest portion of the township. Mackinaw City is also located in the northeast portion of Wawatam Township.

== Geography ==
The township is located in the northwestern corner of Cheboygan County, bordered by the Straits of Mackinac to the northeast and Emmet County to the west. According to the United States Census Bureau, the township has a total area of 12.4 square miles (32.2 km^{2}), of which 11.4 square miles (29.6 km^{2}) is land and 1.0 square mile (2.7 km^{2}), or 8.33%, is water.

== Demographics ==
As of the census of 2000, there were 576 people, 260 households, and 165 families residing in the township. The population density was 50.3 inhabitants per square mile (19.4/km^{2}). There were 415 housing units at an average density of 36.3 per square mile (14.0/km^{2}). The racial makeup of the township was 93.40% White, 2.95% Native American, and 3.65% from two or more races. Hispanic or Latino of any race were 0.17% of the population.

There were 260 households, out of which 21.9% had children under the age of 18 living with them, 51.9% were married couples living together, 9.2% had a female householder with no husband present, and 36.2% were non-families. 31.2% of all households were made up of individuals, and 15.0% had someone living alone who was 65 years of age or older. The average household size was 2.22 and the average family size was 2.71.

In the township the population was spread out, with 20.8% under the age of 18, 4.9% from 18 to 24, 24.1% from 25 to 44, 31.3% from 45 to 64, and 18.9% who were 65 years of age or older. The median age was 45 years. For every 100 females, there were 88.9 males. For every 100 females age 18 and over, there were 89.2 males.

The median income for a household in the township was $38,500, and the median income for a family was $41,923. Males had a median income of $31,875 versus $25,250 for females. The per capita income for the township was $20,766. About 8.3% of families and 9.6% of the population were below the poverty line, including 5.2% of those under age 18 and 5.3% of those age 65 or over.
